= List of Brassicaceae genera =

There are around 350 genera in the plant family Brassicaceae. The type genus is Brassica (cabbage and mustards). Genera with a large number of species are Alyssum (madworts), Arabis (rockcresses), Cardamine (bittercresses), Draba (whitlow-grasses), Erysimum (wallflowers), Heliophila, Lepidium (pepperworts), Noccaea, Odontarrhena, Physaria (bladderpods), and Rorippa (yellowcresses).

The following list includes the 354 genera that are accepted by Plants of the World Online as of July 2025. Other sources include the Update on the Brassicaceae species checklist or v1.3 of BrassiBase (as accessed in late 2021).

== A–B ==
- Abdra Greene
- Acirostrum Y.Z.Zhao (Note: Accepted in BrassiBase but not in the Updated Checklist)
- Acuston Raf.
- Aethionema W.T.Aiton
- Aimara Salariato & Al-Shehbaz
- Alliaria Heist. ex Fabr.
- Alshehbazia Salariato & Zuloaga
- Altriarabis Y.Z.Zhao
- Alyssoides Mill.
- Alyssopsis Boiss.
- Alyssum L.
- Ammosperma Hook.f.
- Anastatica L.
- Ancashia Al-Shehbaz, Salariato, A.Cano & Zuloaga
- Andrzeiowskia Rchb.
- Anelsonia J.F.Macbr. & Payson
- Anzhengxia Al-Shehbaz & D.A.German (Note: Spelled "Anzhenxia" in BrassiBase.)
- Aphragmus Andrz. ex DC.
- Aplanodes Marais
- Arabidella (F.Muell.) O.E.Schulz
- Arabidopsis Heynh.
- Arabis L.
- Arcyosperma O.E.Schulz
- Armoracia G.Gaertn., B.Mey. & Scherb.
- Aschersoniodoxa Gilg. & Muschl.
- Asperuginoides Rauschert
- Asta Klotzsch ex O.E.Schulz
- Atacama Toro-Núñez, Mort & Al-Shehbaz
- Atelanthera Hook.f. & Thomson
- Athysanus Greene
- Aubrieta Adans.
- Aurinia (L.) Desv.
- Baimashania Al-Shehbaz
- Ballantinia Hook.f. ex Airy Shaw
- Barbamine A.P.Khokhr.
- Barbarea W.T.Aiton
- Bengt-jonsellia Al-Shehbaz
- Berteroa DC.
- Bifurcipilus Y.Z.Zhao
- Biscutella L.
- Bivonaea DC.
- Blennodia R.Br.
- Boechera Á.Löve & D.Löve
- Borealandea Al-Shehbaz, Salariato, A.Cano & Zuloaga
- Bornmuellera Hausskn.
- Borodinia Busch
- Botschantzevia Nabiev
- Brachypus Ledeb.
- × Brassarda Su Liu & Z.H.Feng (Brassica × Mutarda)
- Brassica L.
- Braya Sternb. & Hoppe
- Bunias L.

== C–D ==
- Cakile Mill.
- Calepina Adans.
- Calymmatium O.E.Schulz
- Camelina Crantz
- Camelinopsis A.G.Mill.
- Capsella Medik.
- Cardamine L.
- Carinavalva Ising
- Carrichtera DC.
- Catenulina Soják
- Catolobus C.A.Mey.) Al-Shehbaz
- Ceratocnemum Coss. & Balansa
- Chamira Thunb.
- Chartoloma Bunge
- Chaunanthus O.E.Schulz
- Chilocardamum O.E.Schulz
- Chlorocrambe Rydb.
- Chorispora R.Br. ex DC.
- Christolea Cambess.
- Chrysochamela (Fenzl) Boiss.
- Cithareloma Bunge
- Clastopus Bunge ex Boiss.
- Clausia Korn.-Trotzky
- Clypeola L.
- Cochlearia L.
- Coincya Rouy
- Conringia Heist. ex Fabr.
- Cordylocarpus Desf.
- Crambe L.
- Crambella Maire
- Cremolobus DC.
- Crucihimalaya Al-Shehbaz, O'Kane & R.A.Price
- Cryptospora Kar. & Kir.
- Cuphonotus O.E.Schulz (synonym of Lemphoria)
- Cuprella Salmerón-Sánchez, Mota & Fuertes
- Cusickiella Rollins
- Cymatocarpus O.E.Schulz
- Dactylocardamum Al-Shehbaz
- Degenia Hayek
- Delpinophytum Speg.
- Descurainia Webb & Berthel.
- Diceratella Boiss.
- Dichasianthus Ovcz. & Yunusov
- Dictyophragmus O.E.Schulz
- Didesmus Desv.
- Didymophysa Boiss.
- Dielsiocharis O.E.Schulz
- Dilophia Thomson
- Dimorphocarpa Rollins
- Diplotaxis DC.
- Dipoma Franch.
- Diptychocarpus Trautv.
- Dithyrea Harv.
- Dontostemon Andrz. ex C.A.Mey.
- Douepea Cambess.
- Draba Dill. ex L.
- Drabastrum (F.Muell.) O.E.Schulz
- Drabella (DC.) Fourr.
- Dryopetalon A.Gray
- Dvorakia D.A.German

== E–I ==
- Eigia Soják
- Enarthrocarpus Labill.
- Englerocharis Muschl.
- Eremobium Boiss.
- Eremoblastus Botch.
- Eremophyton Bég.
- Eruca Mill.
- Erucaria Gaertn.
- Erucastrum (DC.) C.Presl.
- Erysimum Tourn. ex L.
- Euclidium W.T.Aiton
- Eudema Bonpl.
- Eutrema R.Br.
- Exhalimolobos Al-Shehbaz & C.D.Bailey
- Farsetia Turra
- Fezia Pit. ex Batt.
- Fibigia Medik.
- Foleyola Maire
- Fortuynia Shuttlew. ex Boiss.
- Fourraea Greuter & Burdet
- Galitzkya V.V.Botschantz.
- Geococcus J.Drumm. ex Harv.
- Glastaria Boiss.
- Goerkemia Yıld. (Note: Accepted in the Updated Checklist, but not in BrassiBase.)
- Goldbachia DC.
- Gongylis Theophr. ex Molinari & Sánchez Och.
- Graellsia Boiss.
- Guiraoa Coss.
- Gynophorea Gilli
- Halimolobos Tausch
- Harmsiodoxa O.E.Schulz
- Hedinia Ostenf.
- Heldreichia Boiss.
- Heliophila Burm.f. ex L.
- Hemicrambe Webb
- Hemilophia Franch.
- Henophyton Coss. & Durieu
- Hesperidanthus Rydb.
- Hesperis L.
- Hirschfeldia Münchh.
- Hollermayera O.E.Schulz
- Hormathophylla Cullen & T.R.Dudley
- Hornungia Rchb.
- Horwoodia Turrill
- Hurkaea Al-Shehbaz, M.Koch, R.Karl & D.A.German
- Ianhedgea Al-Shehbaz & O'Kane
- Iberis Dill. ex L.
- Idahoa A.Nelson & J.F.Macbr.
- Iljinskaea Al-Shehbaz, Özüdoğru & D.A.German
- Iodanthus Torr. & A.Gray
- Ionopsidium Rchb.
- Irania Hadač & Chrtek
- Irenepharsus Hewson
- Isatis Tourn. ex L.
- Iskandera N.Busch
- Ivania O.E.Schulz

== K–M ==
- Kernera Medik.
- Kremeriella Maire
- Lachnocapsa Balf.f.
- Lachnoloma Bunge
- Ladakiella D.A.German & Al-Shehbaz
- Leavenworthia Torr.
- Leiospora (C.A.Mey.) F.Dvořák
- Lemphoria O.E.Schulz
- Lepidium L.
- Lepidostemon Hook.f. & Thomson
- Lepidotrichum Velen. & Bornm.
- Leptaleum DC.
- Litwinowia Wonorow
- Lobularia Desv.
- Lonchophora Durieu
- Lunaria Tourn. ex L.
- Lutzia Gand.
- Lycocarpus O.E.Schulz
- Lyrocarpa Hook. & Harv.
- Lysakia Esmailbegi & Al-Shehbaz
- Machaerophorus Schltdl.
- Macropodium W.T.Aiton
- Malcolmia W.T.Aiton
- Mancoa Wedd.
- Marcus-kochia Al-Shehbaz
- Maresia Pomel
- Mathewsia Hook. & Arn.
- Matthiola W.T.Aiton
- Megacarpaea DC.
- Megadenia Maxim.
- Meniocus Desv.
- Menkea Lehm.
- Menonvillea DC.
- Metashangrilaia Al-Shehbaz & D.A.German
- Microlepidium F.Muell.
- Microstigma Trautv.
- Morettia DC.
- Moricandia DC.
- Moriera Boiss.
- Morisia J.Gay
- Mostacillastrum O.E.Schulz
- Mummenhoffia Esmailbegi & Al-Shehbaz
- Murbeckiella Rothm.
- Muricaria Desv.
- Mutarda Bernh.
- Myagrum L.

== N–P ==
- Nasturtiopsis Boiss.
- Nasturtium W.T.Aiton
- Neotorularia Hedge & J.Léonard
- Nerisyrenia Greene
- Neslia Desv.
- Neuontobotrys O.E.Schulz
- Nevada N.T.Holmgren
- Noccaea Moench
- Noccaeopsis F.K.Mey.
- Noccidium F.K.Mey.
- Notoceras W.T.Aiton
- Notothlaspi Hook.f.
- Ochthodium DC.
- Octoceras Bunge
- Odontarrhena C.A.Mey.
- Olimarabidopsis Al-Shehbaz, O'Kane & R.A.Price
- Onuris Phil.
- Oreoloma Botsch.
- Oreophyton O.E.Schulz
- Ornithocarpa Rose
- Orychophragmus Bunge
- Otocarpus Durieu
- Pachycladon Hook.f.
- Pachymitus O.E.Schulz
- Pachyneurum Bunge
- Pachyphragma Rchb.
- Parlatoria Boiss.
- Parodiodoxa O.E.Schulz
- Parolinia Webb
- Parrya R.Br.
- Parryodes Jafri
- Paysonia O'Kane & Al-Shehbaz
- Peltaria Jacq.
- Peltariopsis (Boiss.) N.Busch
- Pennellia Nieuwl.
- Petiniotia J.Léonard
- Petrocallis W.T.Aiton
- Petroravenia Al-Shehbaz
- Phlebolobium O.E.Schulz
- Phlegmatospermum O.E.Schulz
- Phoenicaulis Nutt.
- Phravenia Al-Shehbaz & Warwick
- Phyllolepidum Trinajstić (Note: Spelled "Phyllolepidium" in the Updated Checklist.)
- Physaria A.Gray
- Physoptychis Boiss.
- Physorhynchus Hook.
- Plagioloba (C.A.Mey.) Rchb.
- Planodes Greene
- Polyctenium Greene
- Polypsecadium O.E.Schulz
- Pringlea Anderson ex Hook.f
- Pseuderucaria O.E.Schulz
- Pseudoarabidopsis Al-Shehbaz, O'Kane & R.A.Price
- Pseudocamelina (Boiss.) N.Busch
- Pseudodraba Al-Shehbaz, D.A.German & M.Koch
- Pseudoturritis Al-Shehbaz
- Pseudovesicaria (Boiss.) Rupr.
- Psychine Desf.
- Pterygostemon V.V.Botschantz.
- Ptilotrichum C.A.Mey.
- Pugionium Gaertn.
- Pulvinatusia J.P.Yue, H.L.Chen, Al-Shehbaz & H.Sun
- Pycnoplinthopsis Jafri
- Pycnoplinthus O.E.Schulz

== Q–S ==
- Quezeliantha H.Scholz
- Quidproquo Greuter & Burdet
- Raffenaldia Godr.
- Raphanorhyncha Rollins (Note: Spelled "Raphanoryncha" in the Updated Checklist.)
- Raphanus L.
- × Rapistrosymbrium P.Fourn. ex Madiot (Rapistrum × Sisymerium)
- Rapistrum Crantz
- Resetnikia Španiel, Al-Shehbaz, D.A.German & Marhold
- Rhammatophyllum O.E.Schulz
- Rhizobotrya Tausch
- Ricotia L.
- Robeschia Hochst. ex O.E.Schulz
- Romanschulzia O.E.Schulz
- Rorippa Scop.
- Rudolf-kamelinia Al-Shehbaz & D.A.German
- Rytidocarpus Coss.
- Sandbergia Greene
- Sarcodraba Gilg. & Muschl.
- Savignya DC.
- Scambopus O.E.Schulz
- Scapiarabis M.Koch, R.Karl, D.A.German & Al-Shehbaz
- Schimpera Steud. & Hochst. ex Endl.
- Schizopetalon Sims
- Schouwia DC.
- Schrenkiella D.A.German & Al-Shehbaz
- Scoliaxon Payson
- Selenia Nutt.
- Shangrilaia Al-Shehbaz, J.P.Yue & H.Sun
- Shehbazia D.A.German
- Sibara Greene
- Sinalliaria X.F.Jin, Y.Y.Zhou & H.W.Zhang
- Sinapidendron Lowe
- Sinapis L.
- Sinoarabis R.Karl, D.A.German, M.Koch & Al-Shehbaz
- Sisymbrella Spach
- Sisymbriopsis Botsch. & Tzvelev
- Sisymbrium L.
- Smelowskia C.A.Mey.
- Sobolewskia M.Bieb.
- Solms-laubachia Muschl.
- Sphaerocardamum S.Schauer
- Spryginia Popov
- Stanleya Nutt.
- Stenodraba O.E.Schulz
- Stenodrabopsis Al-Shehbaz, Salariato, A.Cano & Zuloaga
- Stenopetalum R.Br. ex DC.
- Sterigmostemum M.Bieb.
- Stevenia Adams & Fisch.
- Streptanthella Rydb.
- Streptanthus Nutt.
- Streptoloma Bunge
- Strigosella Boiss.
- Subularia L.
- Succowia Medik.
- Synstemon Botsch.
- Synthlipsis A.Gray

== T–Z ==
- Takhtajaniella V.E.Avet.
- Teesdalia W.T.Aiton
- Terraria T.J.Hildebr. & Al-Shehbaz
- Tetracme Bunge
- Thelypodiopsis Rydb.
- Thelypodium Endl.
- Thlaspi L.
- Thysanocarpus Hook.
- Tomostima Raf.
- Trichotolinum O.E.Schulz
- Tropidocarpum Hook.
- Turritis Tourn. ex L.
- Vella L.
- Veselskya Opiz
- Warea Nutt.
- Weberbauera Gilg & Muschl
- Xerodraba Skottsb.
- Yinshania Ma & Y.Z.Zhao
- Yosemitea P.J.Alexander & Windham
- Yunkia Salariato & Al-Shehbaz
- Zahora Lemmel & M.Koch
- Zilla Forssk.
- Zuloagocardamum Salariato & Al-Shehbaz
