= Spryginia =

Scientific classification
- Kingdom: Plantae
- Clade: Tracheophytes
- Clade: Angiosperms
- Clade: Eudicots
- Clade: Rosids
- Order: Brassicales
- Family: Brassicaceae
- Genus: Spryginia; Popov

Genus of flowering plants

Spryginia is a genus of flowering plants belonging to the family Brassicaceae.

Its native range is Iran to Central Asia to Afghanistan.

Species:

- Spryginia afghanica Botsch.
- Spryginia crassifolia (Botsch.) Botsch.
- Spryginia falcata Botsch.
- Spryginia gracilis Botsch.
- Spryginia pilosa Botsch.
- Spryginia undulata Botsch.
- Spryginia winkleri (Regel) Popov
