= Trichotolinum =

Scientific classification
- Kingdom: Plantae
- Clade: Tracheophytes
- Clade: Angiosperms
- Clade: Eudicots
- Clade: Rosids
- Order: Brassicales
- Family: Brassicaceae
- Genus: Trichotolinum; O.E.Schulz
- Species: T. deserticola

Binomial name
- Trichotolinum deserticola (Speg.) O.E.Schulz

Synonyms
- Descurainia deserticola (Speg.) Speg.; Draba deserticola (Macloskie) Macloskie; Sisymbrium deserticola Speg. (1897) (basionym); Sophia deserticola Macloskie

Genus of flowering plants

Trichotolinum is a genus of flowering plants belonging to the family Brassicaceae. It includes a single species, Trichotolinum deserticola, a perennial endemic to southern Argentina.
