= Chartoloma =

Scientific classification
- Kingdom: Plantae
- Clade: Tracheophytes
- Clade: Angiosperms
- Clade: Eudicots
- Clade: Rosids
- Order: Brassicales
- Family: Brassicaceae
- Genus: Chartoloma; Bunge
- Species: C. platycarpum

Binomial name
- Chartoloma platycarpum (Bunge) Bunge

Synonyms
- Isatis platycarpa Bunge

Genus of flowering plants

Chartoloma is a genus of flowering plants belonging to the family Brassicaceae. It includes a single species, Chartoloma platycarpum, an annual native to Turkmenistan and Uzbekistan.
