= Pachyneurum =

Scientific classification
- Kingdom: Plantae
- Clade: Tracheophytes
- Clade: Angiosperms
- Clade: Eudicots
- Clade: Rosids
- Order: Brassicales
- Family: Brassicaceae
- Genus: Pachyneurum; Bunge
- Species: P. grandiflorum

Binomial name
- Pachyneurum grandiflorum (C.A.Mey.) Bunge

Synonyms
- Braya meyeri Bunge ex Walp.; Draba grandiflora C.A.Mey. (1831) (basionym); Ermania microcarpa (Ledeb.) F.Dvořák; Eutrema piliferum Turcz.; Parrya grandiflora (C.A.Mey.) Schischk.; Parrya microcarpa Ledeb.

Genus of plants

Pachyneurum is a genus of flowering plants belonging to the family Brassicaceae. It contains a single species, Pachyneurum grandiflorum, a perennial native to subalpine and subarctic regions of Xinjiang, Mongolia, and southern Siberia (Altai, Tuva, Buryatia, and Chita Oblast).
