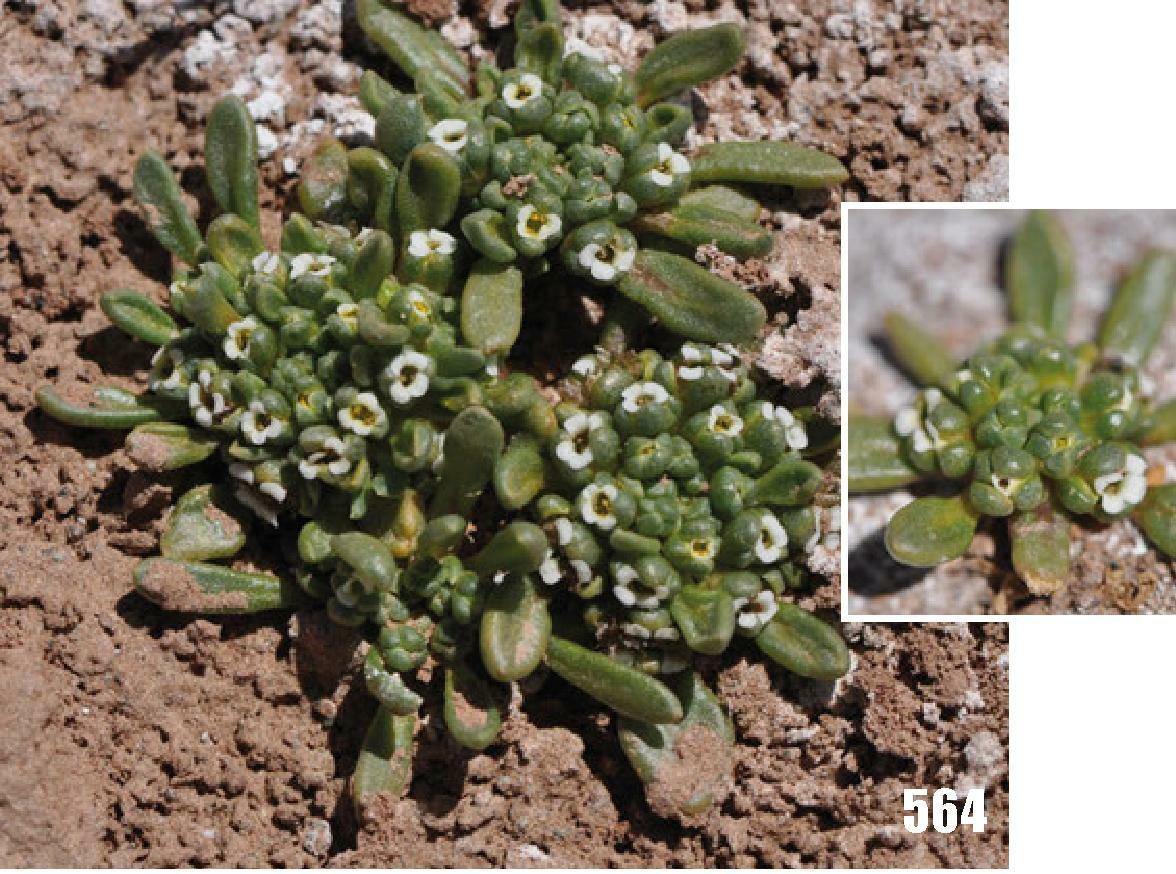
- Dilophia salsa

Scientific classification
- Kingdom: Plantae
- Clade: Tracheophytes
- Clade: Angiosperms
- Clade: Eudicots
- Clade: Rosids
- Order: Brassicales
- Family: Brassicaceae
- Genus: Dilophia; Thomson

= Dilophia =

Genus of plants

Dilophia is a genus of flowering plants belonging to the family Brassicaceae.

Its native range is Central Asia to Himalaya and China.

Species:

- Dilophia ebracteata Maxim.
- Dilophia salsa Thomson
