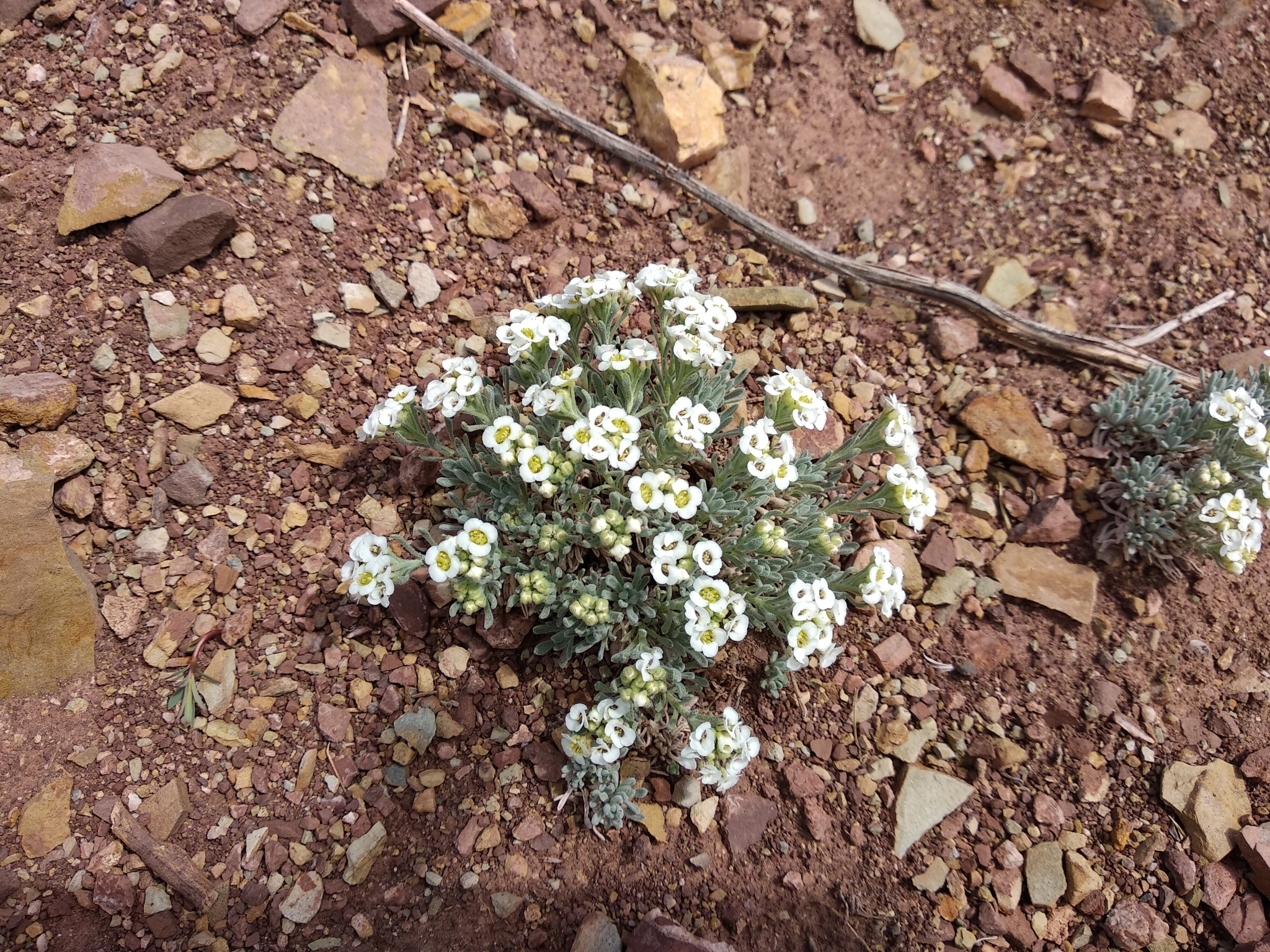

Scientific classification
- Kingdom: Plantae
- Clade: Tracheophytes
- Clade: Angiosperms
- Clade: Eudicots
- Clade: Rosids
- Order: Brassicales
- Family: Brassicaceae
- Genus: Ptilotrichum; C.A.Mey.
- Species: P. canescens

Binomial name
- Ptilotrichum canescens (DC.) C.A.Mey.

Varieties
- Ptilotrichum canescens var. canescens; Ptilotrichum canescens var. elongatiforme A.L.Ebel

Synonyms
- Alyssum canescens DC. (1821), nom. cons. (basionym); Anodontea canescens (DC.) Sweet; Stevenia canescens (DC.) D.A.German

= Ptilotrichum =

Genus of plants

Ptilotrichum is a genus of flowering plants belonging to the family Brassicaceae. It includes a single species, Ptilotrichum canescens, a subshrub native to temperate Asia, which ranges from southern Siberia to northern China and the western Himalaya.

Two varieties are accepted.

- Ptilotrichum canescens var. canescens – southern Siberia to northern China and the western Himalaya
- Ptilotrichum canescens var. elongatiforme A.L.Ebel – Altai Mountains of southern Siberia
