= Lyrocarpa =

Scientific classification
- Kingdom: Plantae
- Clade: Tracheophytes
- Clade: Angiosperms
- Clade: Eudicots
- Clade: Rosids
- Order: Brassicales
- Family: Brassicaceae
- Genus: Lyrocarpa; Hook. & Harv.

Genus of plants

Lyrocarpa is a genus of flowering plants belonging to the family Brassicaceae.

Its native range is Southwestern USA to Northwestern Mexico.

Species:

- Lyrocarpa coulteri Hook. & Harv.
- Lyrocarpa linearifolia Rollins
- Lyrocarpa xanti Brandegee
