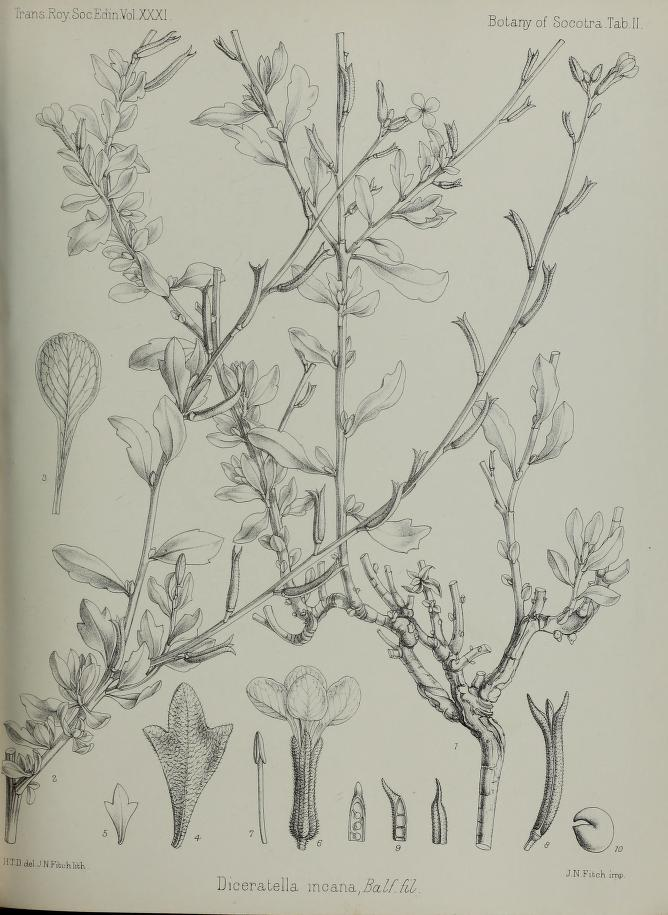
- Diceratella incana

Scientific classification
- Kingdom: Plantae
- Clade: Tracheophytes
- Clade: Angiosperms
- Clade: Eudicots
- Clade: Rosids
- Order: Brassicales
- Family: Brassicaceae
- Genus: Diceratella; Boiss.

= Diceratella =

Genus of plants

Diceratella is a genus of flowering plants belonging to the family Brassicaceae.

Its native range is Northeastern Tropical Africa to Kenya, Southern Iran.

Species:

- Diceratella alata Jonsell & Moggi
- Diceratella canescens (Boiss.) Boiss.
- Diceratella elliptica (DC.) Jonsell
- Diceratella floccosa (Boiss.) Boiss.
- Diceratella incana Balf.f.
- Diceratella inermis Jonsell
- Diceratella psilotrichoides Chiov.
- Diceratella revoilii (Franch.) Jonsell
- Diceratella smithii (Baker f.) Jonsell
