= Anzhengxia =

Scientific classification
- Kingdom: Plantae
- Clade: Tracheophytes
- Clade: Angiosperms
- Clade: Eudicots
- Clade: Rosids
- Order: Brassicales
- Family: Brassicaceae
- Genus: Anzhengxia; Al-Shehbaz & D.A.German
- Species: A. yechengnica

Binomial name
- Anzhengxia yechengnica (C.H.An) Al-Shehbaz & D.A.German

Synonyms
- Microsisymbrium yechengnicum C.H.An (1981) (basionym); Sisymbriopsis yechengnica (C.H.An) Al-Shehbaz, C.H.An & G.Yang; Sisymbrium yechengnicum (C.H.An) Y.Z.Zhao

Genus of flowering plants

Anzhengxia is a genus of flowering plants belonging to the family Brassicaceae. It includes a single species, Anzhengxia yechengnica, an annual or perennial native to Xinjiang province in western China, where it grows in subalpine habitats.
