= Scoliaxon =

Scientific classification
- Kingdom: Plantae
- Clade: Tracheophytes
- Clade: Angiosperms
- Clade: Eudicots
- Clade: Rosids
- Order: Brassicales
- Family: Brassicaceae
- Genus: Scoliaxon; Payson
- Species: S. mexicanus

Binomial name
- Scoliaxon mexicanus (S.Watson) Payson

Synonyms
- Cochlearia mexicana S.Watson; Lesquerella flexuosa Brandegee

Genus of plants

Scoliaxon is a monotypic genus of flowering plants belonging to the family Brassicaceae. The only species is Scoliaxon mexicanus, which is native to is northeastern Mexico.
