= Lachnoloma =

Scientific classification
- Kingdom: Plantae
- Clade: Tracheophytes
- Clade: Angiosperms
- Clade: Eudicots
- Clade: Rosids
- Order: Brassicales
- Family: Brassicaceae
- Genus: Lachnoloma; Bunge
- Species: L. lehmannii

Binomial name
- Lachnoloma lehmannii Bunge

Genus of plants

Lachnoloma is a genus of flowering plants belonging to the family Brassicaceae. It includes a single species, Lachnoloma lehmannii, an annual native to northeastern Iran, Central Asia (Kazakhstan, Kirgizstan, Tadzhikistan, Turkmenistan, and Uzbekistan) and Xinjiang.
