= Otocarpus =

Scientific classification
- Kingdom: Plantae
- Clade: Tracheophytes
- Clade: Angiosperms
- Clade: Eudicots
- Clade: Rosids
- Order: Brassicales
- Family: Brassicaceae
- Genus: Otocarpus; Durieu
- Species: O. virgatus

Binomial name
- Otocarpus virgatus Durieu

Genus of plants

Otocarpus is a genus of flowering plants belonging to the family Brassicaceae. It includes a single species, Otocarpus virgatus, which is endemic to Algeria.
