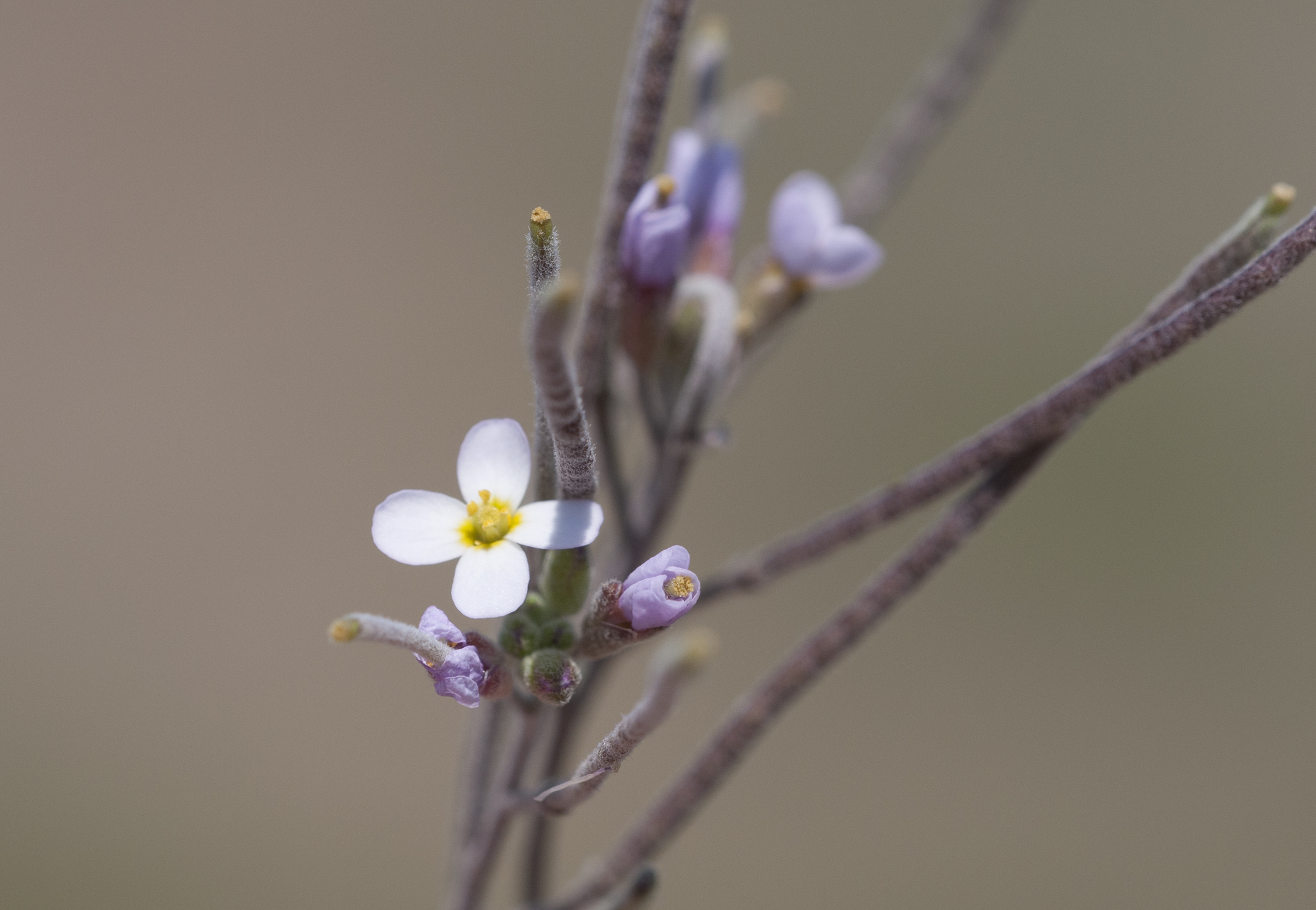
- Maresia nana

Scientific classification
- Kingdom: Plantae
- Clade: Tracheophytes
- Clade: Angiosperms
- Clade: Eudicots
- Clade: Rosids
- Order: Brassicales
- Family: Brassicaceae
- Genus: Maresia; Pomel

= Maresia =

Genus of flowering plants

Maresia is a genus of plants in the family Brassicaceae. The species can be found along the Mediterranean Sea and towards Iran and Afghanistan. There are two species in this genus:

- Maresia nana (DC.) Batt.
- Maresia pulchella (DC.) O.E.Schulz
