= Goerkemia =

Scientific classification
- Kingdom: Plantae
- Clade: Tracheophytes
- Clade: Angiosperms
- Clade: Eudicots
- Clade: Rosids
- Order: Brassicales
- Family: Brassicaceae
- Genus: Goerkemia; Yıld.
- Species: G. turcica

Binomial name
- Goerkemia turcica Yıld.

Genus of flowering plants

Goerkemia is a monotypic genus of flowering plants belonging to the family Brassicaceae. It contains just one species, Goerkemia turcica, which is endemic to Asiatic Turkey.

Its genus name of Goerkemia is in honour of Görkem Yıldırımlı (20th and 21st centuries), a Turkish plant collector and son of the botanist Şinasi Yıldırımlı (b. 1949); they both founded a herbarium. It was first described and published in Ot Sist. Bot. Dergisi Vol.6 Issue 2 on page 2 in (1999. publ. 2000).
