= Shehbazia =

Scientific classification
- Kingdom: Plantae
- Clade: Tracheophytes
- Clade: Angiosperms
- Clade: Eudicots
- Clade: Rosids
- Order: Brassicales
- Family: Brassicaceae
- Tribe: Shehbaziae
- Genus: Shehbazia; D.A.German
- Species: S. tibetica

Binomial name
- Shehbazia tibetica (Maxim.) D.A.German

Synonyms
- Gaoshania Y.Z.Zhao; Dontostemon tibeticus (Maxim.) Al-Shehbaz; Gaoshania tibetica (Maxim.) Y.Z.Zhao; Hesperis tibetica Kuntze; Nasturtium tibeticum Maxim. (1889) (basionym); Sisymbrium tibeticum E.Fourn.

Genus of flowering plants

Shehbazia is a genus of flowering plants in the family Brassicaceae. It includes a single species, Shehbazia tibetica, a biennial native to subalpine regions of Tibet, Qinghai, and Gansu.

The species was first described as Nasturtium tibeticum by Carl Johann Maximowicz in 1889. In 2014 Dmitry A. German and Nicolai Fresen placed the species in the new monotypic genus Shehbazia as Shehbazia tibetica. The genus was named in honor of botanist Ihsan Ali Al-Shehbaz for his contributions to the study of family Brassicaceae. Based on morphological and phylogenetic evidence the authors thought it likely that the species originated in an ancient hybridization event between a species in tribe Chorisporeae and another in tribe Dontostemoneae. and named a new monotypic tribe, Shehbazieae, to accommodate the genus.
