= Cremolobus =

Scientific classification
- Kingdom: Plantae
- Clade: Tracheophytes
- Clade: Angiosperms
- Clade: Eudicots
- Clade: Rosids
- Order: Brassicales
- Family: Brassicaceae
- Genus: Cremolobus; DC.

Synonyms
- Loxoptera O.E.Schulz; Urbanodoxa Muschl

Genus of flowering plants

Cremolobus is a genus of flowering plants belonging to the family Brassicaceae. It includes six species native to the Andes, ranging from Colombia through Ecuador, Peru, and Bolivia to northwestern Argentina.

== Species ==
Six species are accepted.

- Cremolobus chilensis (Lag. ex DC.) DC.
- Cremolobus peruvianus (Lam.) DC.
- Cremolobus rhomboideus Hook.
- Cremolobus stenophyllus Muschl.
- Cremolobus subscandens Kuntze
- Cremolobus suffruticosus (DC.) DC.
