= Noccidium =

Scientific classification
- Kingdom: Plantae
- Clade: Tracheophytes
- Clade: Angiosperms
- Clade: Eudicots
- Clade: Rosids
- Order: Brassicales
- Family: Brassicaceae
- Tribe: Camelineae
- Genus: Noccidium; F.K.Mey.

Species
- Noccidium hastulatum (DC.) F.K.Mey.; Noccidium tuberculatum F.K.Mey.

Genus of flowering plants

Noccidium is a genus of flowering plants in the family Brassicaceae. It includes two species native to Iran and the Transcaucasus.

- Noccidium hastulatum (DC.) F.K.Mey. – southeastern Transcaucasus to northern and central Iran
- Noccidium tuberculatum F.K.Mey. – Iran
