= Alyssopsis =

Scientific classification
- Kingdom: Plantae
- Clade: Tracheophytes
- Clade: Angiosperms
- Clade: Eudicots
- Clade: Rosids
- Order: Brassicales
- Family: Brassicaceae
- Genus: Alyssopsis; Boiss.

Species
- Alyssopsis mollis (Jacq.) O.E.Schulz; Alyssopsis trinervis Botsch. & Seifulin

Genus of flowering plants in the cabbage family

Alyssopsis is a genus of flowering plants in the family Brassicaceae. It includes two species native to Iran, Turkmenistan, and the Transcaucasus.

- Alyssopsis mollis (Jacq.) O.E.Schulz – southeastern Transcaucasus and Iran
- Alyssopsis trinervis Botsch. & Seifulin – Iran and Turkmenistan
