= Cithareloma =

Scientific classification
- Kingdom: Plantae
- Clade: Tracheophytes
- Clade: Angiosperms
- Clade: Eudicots
- Clade: Rosids
- Order: Brassicales
- Family: Brassicaceae
- Genus: Cithareloma; Bunge

Genus of flowering plants

Cithareloma is a genus of flowering plants belonging to the family Brassicaceae.

Its native range is Western and Central Asia to Pakistan.

Species:

- Cithareloma lehmannii Bunge
- Cithareloma vernum Bunge
