= Carinavalva =

Scientific classification
- Kingdom: Plantae
- Clade: Tracheophytes
- Clade: Angiosperms
- Clade: Eudicots
- Clade: Rosids
- Order: Brassicales
- Family: Brassicaceae
- Genus: Carinavalva; Ising
- Species: C. glauca

Binomial name
- Carinavalva glauca Ising

Genus of flowering plants

Carinavalva is a genus of flowering plants belonging to the family Brassicaceae. It includes a single species, Carinavalva glauca, an annual endemic to deserts and dry shrublands in South Australia.
