= Lonchophora =

Scientific classification
- Kingdom: Plantae
- Clade: Tracheophytes
- Clade: Angiosperms
- Clade: Eudicots
- Clade: Rosids
- Order: Brassicales
- Family: Brassicaceae
- Genus: Lonchophora; Durieu
- Species: L. capiomontana

Binomial name
- Lonchophora capiomontana Durieu

Synonyms
- Lonchophora guyoniana Durieu; Matthiola capiomontana (Durieu) Pomel; Matthiola lonchophora Pomel

Genus of plants

Lonchophora is a genus of flowering plants belonging to the family Brassicaceae. It includes a single species, Lonchophora capiomontana, which is native to Algeria, Libya, and Tunisia in northern Africa.
