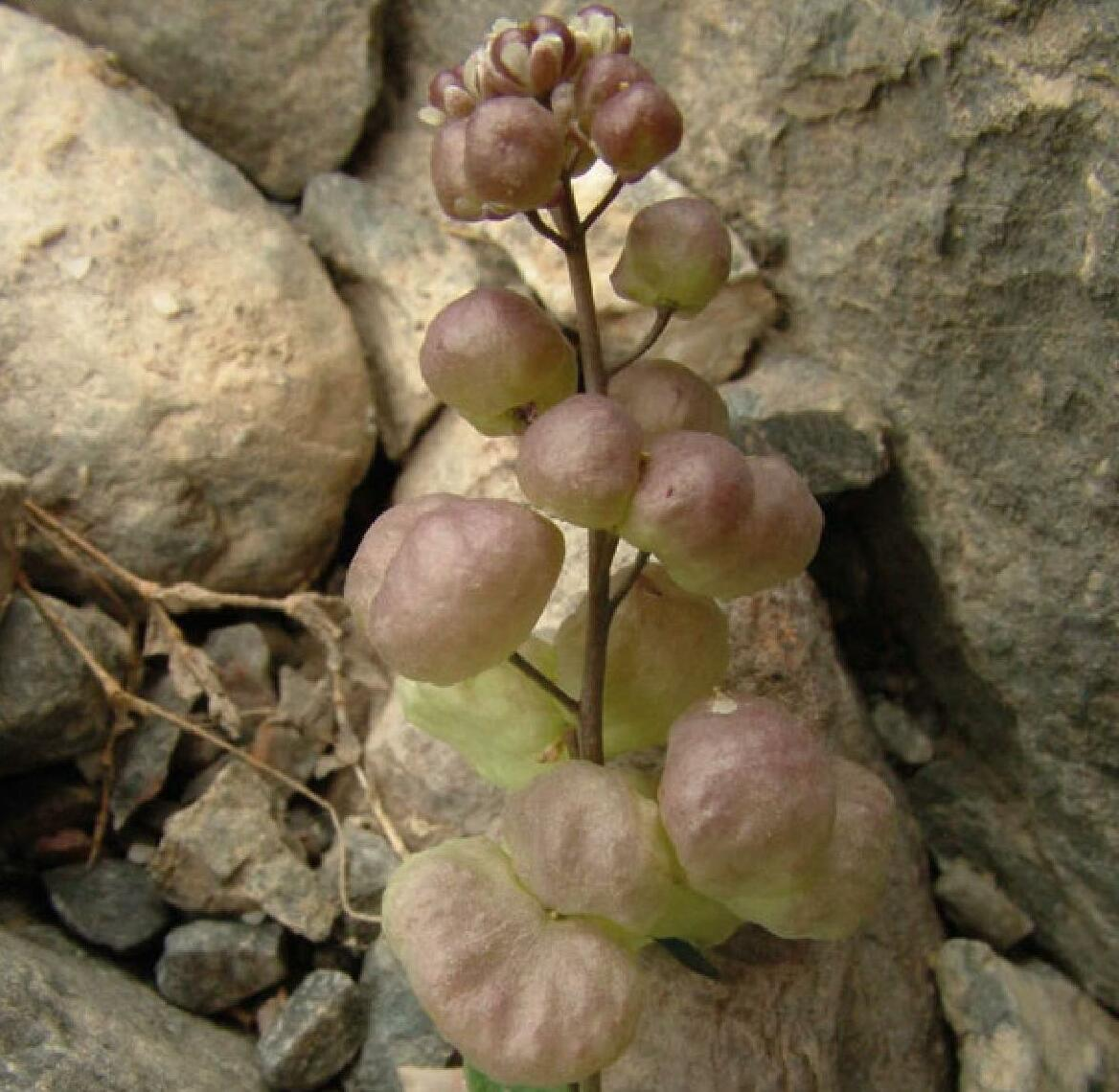
- Didymophysa fedtschenkoana

Scientific classification
- Kingdom: Plantae
- Clade: Tracheophytes
- Clade: Angiosperms
- Clade: Eudicots
- Clade: Rosids
- Order: Brassicales
- Family: Brassicaceae
- Genus: Didymophysa; Boiss.

= Didymophysa =

Genus of plants

Didymophysa is a genus of flowering plants belonging to the family Brassicaceae.

Its native range is Turkey to Western Pakistan.

Species:

- Didymophysa aucheri Boiss.
- Didymophysa fedtschenkoana Regel
- Didymophysa fenestrata (Boiss. & Hohen.) Esmailbegi, D.A.German & Al-Shehbaz
