= Gynophorea =

Scientific classification
- Kingdom: Plantae
- Clade: Tracheophytes
- Clade: Angiosperms
- Clade: Eudicots
- Clade: Rosids
- Order: Brassicales
- Family: Brassicaceae
- Genus: Gynophorea; Gilli
- Species: G. weileri

Binomial name
- Gynophorea weileri Gilli

Genus of flowering plants

Gynophorea is a monotypic genus of flowering plants belonging to the family Brassicaceae. It contains a single species, Gynophorea weileri. It is a subshrub endemic to Afghanistan, where it grows in subalpine areas.
