= Diptychocarpus =

Scientific classification
- Kingdom: Plantae
- Clade: Tracheophytes
- Clade: Angiosperms
- Clade: Eudicots
- Clade: Rosids
- Order: Brassicales
- Family: Brassicaceae
- Genus: Diptychocarpus; Trautv.
- Species: D. strictus

Binomial name
- Diptychocarpus strictus (Fisch. ex M.Bieb.) Trautv.

Synonyms
- Alloceratium Hook.f. & Thomson; Orthorrhiza Stapf; Alloceratium strictum (Fisch. ex M.Bieb.) Hook.f. & Thomson; Chorispermum strictum Kuntze; Chorispermum strictum Andrz. ex DC.; Chorispora stenopetala Regel & Schmalh.; Chorispora stricta (Fisch. ex M.Bieb.) DC.; Matthiola dimorpha Bernh.; Matthiola fischeri Bernh.; Matthiola rostrata Haberle ex Bernh.; Orthorrhiza persica Stapf; Raphanus strictus Fisch. ex M.Bieb.

Genus of plants

Diptychocarpus is a genus of flowering plants belonging to the family Brassicaceae. It includes a single species, Diptychocarpus strictus, an annual which ranges from southern European Russia and the Caucasus through Iran, Pakistan, Central Asia, and Xinjiang to north-central China.
