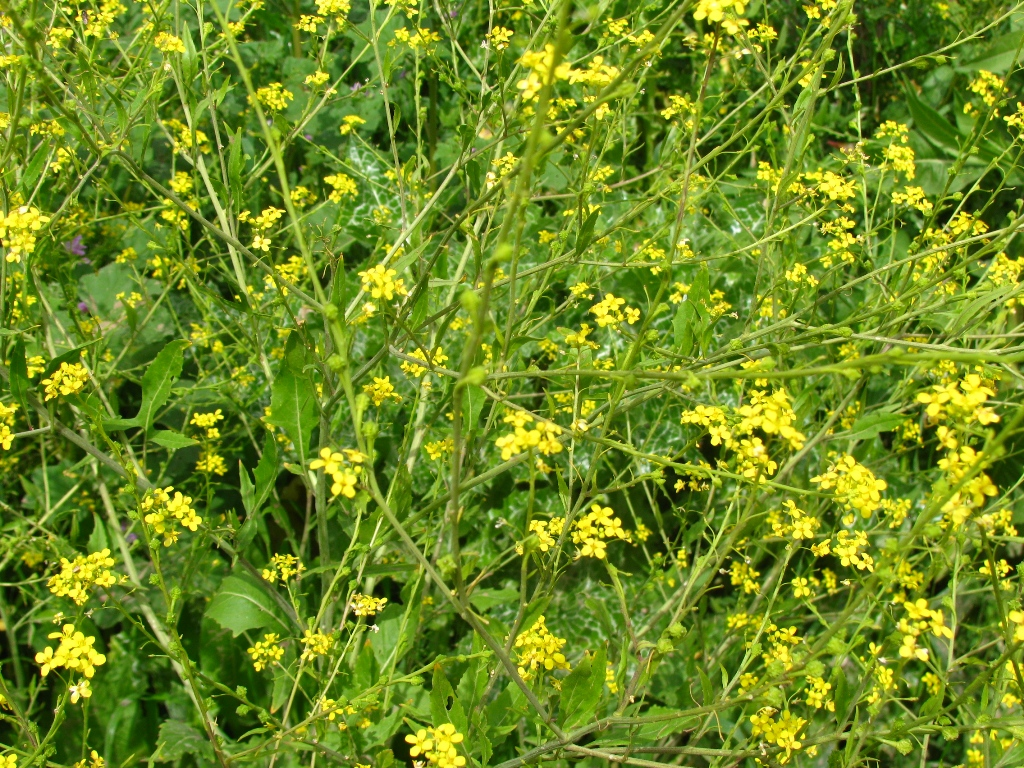
- PikiWiki Israel 7815 Fields of Bethlehem of Galilee

Scientific classification
- Kingdom: Plantae
- Clade: Tracheophytes
- Clade: Angiosperms
- Clade: Eudicots
- Clade: Rosids
- Order: Brassicales
- Family: Brassicaceae
- Genus: Ochthodium; DC.
- Species: O. aegyptiacum

Binomial name
- Ochthodium aegyptiacum (L.) DC.

Synonyms
- Bunias aegyptiaca L. (1767) (basionym); Euclidium aegyptiacum (L.) Andrz. ex DC.; Rapistrum aegyptiacum (L.) W.T.Aiton; Bunias virgata Sm.; Myagrum verrucosum Lam.

= Ochthodium =

Genus of plants

Ochthodium is a genus of flowering plants belonging to the family Brassicaceae. It includes a single species, Ochthodium aegyptiacum, an annual native to Cyprus, Egypt, the Levant, and Turkey in the eastern Mediterranean.
