= Synstemon =

Scientific classification
- Kingdom: Plantae
- Clade: Tracheophytes
- Clade: Angiosperms
- Clade: Eudicots
- Clade: Rosids
- Order: Brassicales
- Family: Brassicaceae
- Genus: Synstemon; Botsch.
- Species: S. petrovii

Binomial name
- Synstemon petrovii Botsch.

Synonyms
- Synstemonanthus Botsch.; Synstemon deserticola Y.Z.Zhao; Synstemon lulianlianus Al-Shehbaz, T.Y.Cheo & G.Yang; Synstemon petrovii var. pilosus Botsch.; Synstemon petrovii var. xinglongnicus C.H.An; Synstemonanthus petrovii (Botsch.) Botsch.; Synstemonanthus petrovii var. pilosus (Botsch.) Botsch.

Genus of flowering plants

Synstemon is a genus of flowering plants belonging to the family Brassicaceae. It includes a single species, Synstemon petrovii, which is native to northern China.
