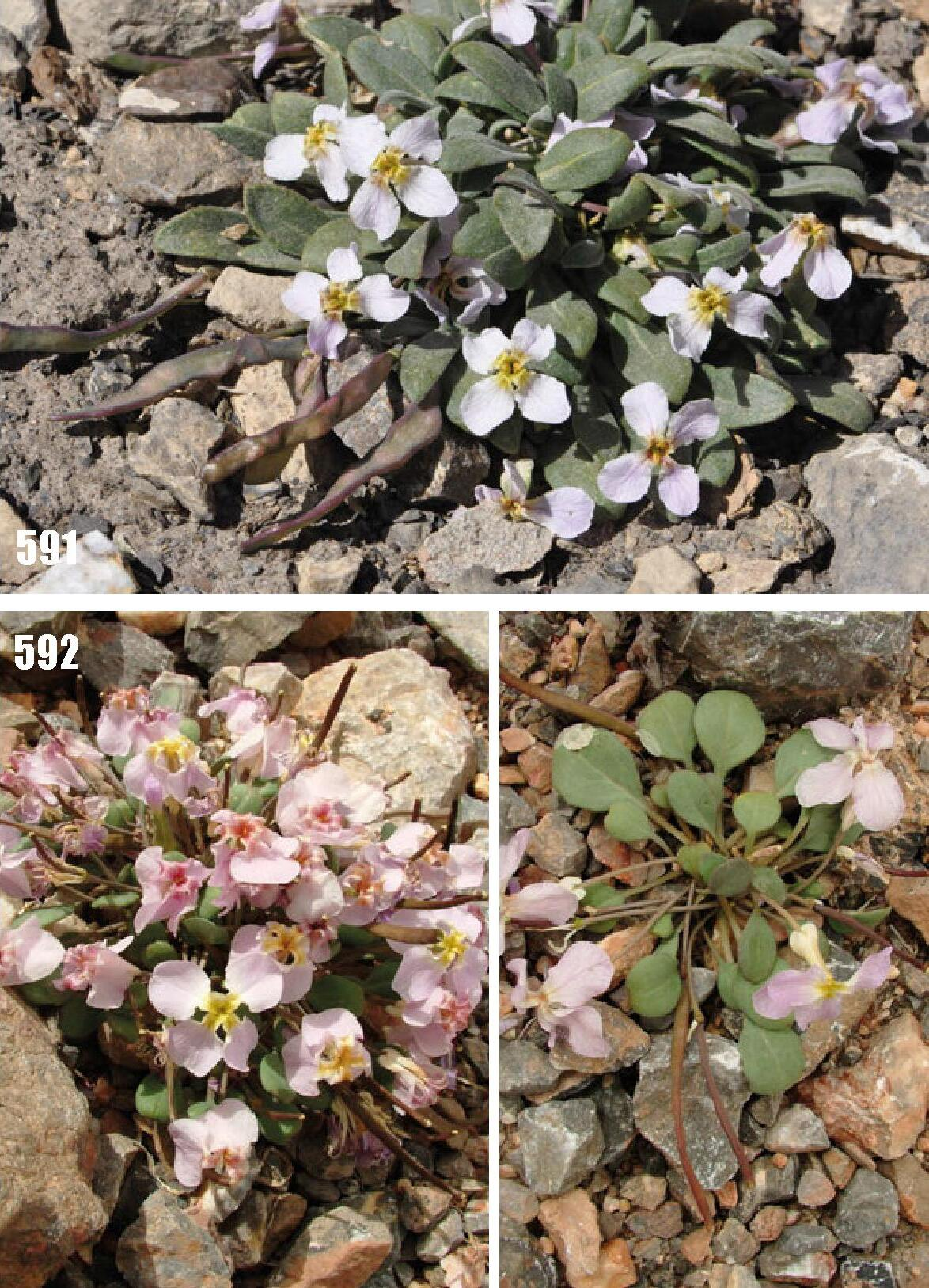
- L. pamirica and L. subscapigera

Scientific classification
- Kingdom: Plantae
- Clade: Tracheophytes
- Clade: Angiosperms
- Clade: Eudicots
- Clade: Rosids
- Order: Brassicales
- Family: Brassicaceae
- Genus: Leiospora (C.A.Mey.) F.Dvořák (1968)

Species
- 8; see text

= Leiospora =

Genus of flowering plants

Leiospora is a genus of flowering plants in the family Brassicaceae. It includes eight species native to central Asia, ranging from Kazakhstan to Tajikistan, the Western Himalayas, Tibet, Xinjiang, Mongolia, and southern Siberia.

== Species ==
Eight species are accepted.

- Leiospora beketovii (Krasn.) D.A.German & Al-Shehbaz
- Leiospora bellidifolia (Danguy) Botsch. & Pachom.
- Leiospora crassifolia (Botsch. & Vved.) A.N.Vassiljeva
- Leiospora eriocalyx (Regel & Schmalh.) F.Dvořák
- Leiospora exscapa (C.A.Mey.) F.Dvořák
- Leiospora pamirica (Botsch. & Vved.) Botsch. & Pachom.
- Leiospora saposhnikovii (A.N.Vassiljeva) D.A.German & Al-Shehbaz
- Leiospora subscapigera (Botsch. & Vved.) Botsch. & Pachom.
