= Rytidocarpus =

Scientific classification
- Kingdom: Plantae
- Clade: Tracheophytes
- Clade: Angiosperms
- Clade: Eudicots
- Clade: Rosids
- Order: Brassicales
- Family: Brassicaceae
- Genus: Rytidocarpus; Coss.
- Species: R. moricandioides

Binomial name
- Rytidocarpus moricandioides Coss.

Synonyms
- Distomocarpus O.E.Schulz; Distomocarpus maroccanus O.E.Schulz; Rytidocarpus maroccanus (O.E.Schulz) Maire; Rytidocarpus moricandioides var. maroccanus (O.E.Schulz) Maire

Genus of plants

Rytidocarpus is a genus of flowering plants belonging to the family Brassicaceae. It includes a single species, Rytidocarpus moricandioides, which is endemic to Morocco.
