= Sinalliaria =

Scientific classification
- Kingdom: Plantae
- Clade: Tracheophytes
- Clade: Angiosperms
- Clade: Eudicots
- Clade: Rosids
- Order: Brassicales
- Family: Brassicaceae
- Tribe: Brassiceae
- Genus: Sinalliaria; X.F.Jin, Y.Y.Zhou & H.W.Zhang
- Species: S. limprichtiana

Binomial name
- Sinalliaria limprichtiana (Pax) X.F.Jin, Y.Y.Zhou & H.W.Zhang

Synonyms
- Cardamine limprichtiana Pax (1911) (basionym); Orychophragmus limprichtianus (Pax) Al-Shehbaz & G.Yang

Genus of flowering plants

Sinalliaria is a genus of flowering plants in the family Brassicaceae. It includes a single species, Sinalliaria limprichtiana, an annual or perennial native to southeastern Anhui and Zhejiang provinces of southeastern China.

== Varieties ==
Two varieties are accepted.

- Sinalliaria limprichtiana var. grandifolia (Z.X.An) X.F.Jin, Y.Y.Zhou & H.W.Zhang (synonym Alliaria grandifolia Z.X.An) – southeastern Anhui and northwestern Zhejiang
- Sinalliaria limprichtiana var. limprichtiana (synonym Cardamine hickinii O.E.Schulz) – southeastern Anhui and Zhejiang
