= Psychine =

Scientific classification
- Kingdom: Plantae
- Clade: Tracheophytes
- Clade: Angiosperms
- Clade: Eudicots
- Clade: Rosids
- Order: Brassicales
- Family: Brassicaceae
- Genus: Psychine; Desf.
- Species: P. stylosa

Binomial name
- Psychine stylosa Desf.

Synonyms
- Psychine numidica Spreng.; Psychine stylosa f. auriculata (Font Quer) Maire; Psychine stylosa var. auriculata Font Quer; Psychine stylosa var. longibracteata Regel; Psychine stylosa var. maroccana Murb.; Thlaspi psychine Willd.

Genus of plants

Psychine is a genus of flowering plants belonging to the family Brassicaceae. It includes a single species, Psychine stylosa, which is native to Algeria, Morocco, and Tunisia.
