= Baimashania =

Scientific classification
- Kingdom: Plantae
- Clade: Tracheophytes
- Clade: Angiosperms
- Clade: Eudicots
- Clade: Rosids
- Order: Brassicales
- Family: Brassicaceae
- Genus: Baimashania; Al-Shehbaz

Genus of flowering plants

Baimashania is a genus of flowering plants belonging to the family Brassicaceae.

Its native range is Qinghai and south-central China.

Species:

- Baimashania pulvinata Al-Shehbaz
- Baimashania wangii Al-Shehbaz
