= Oreoloma =

Scientific classification
- Kingdom: Plantae
- Clade: Tracheophytes
- Clade: Angiosperms
- Clade: Eudicots
- Clade: Rosids
- Order: Brassicales
- Family: Brassicaceae
- Genus: Oreoloma; Botsch.

Genus of plants

Oreoloma is a genus of flowering plants belonging to the family Brassicaceae.

Its native range is Mongolia to Northern China.

Species:

- Oreoloma eglandulosum Botsch.
- Oreoloma fuhaiense (H.L.Yang) H.L.Yang
- Oreoloma grandiflorum (K.C.Kuan) H.L.Yang
- Oreoloma matthioloides (Franch.) Botsch.
- Oreoloma violaceum Botsch.
