= Shangrilaia =

Scientific classification
- Kingdom: Plantae
- Clade: Tracheophytes
- Clade: Angiosperms
- Clade: Eudicots
- Clade: Rosids
- Order: Brassicales
- Family: Brassicaceae
- Tribe: Euclidieae
- Genus: Shangrilaia; Al-Shehbaz, J.P.Yue & H.Sun
- Species: S. nana

Binomial name
- Shangrilaia nana Al-Shehbaz, J.P.Yue & H.Sun

Genus of flowering plants

Shangrilaia is a genus of flowering plants in the family Brassicaceae. It includes a single species, Shangrilaia nana, which is endemic to Yunnan province of south-central China, where it grows in subalpine habitats. The genus and species were described in 2004.
