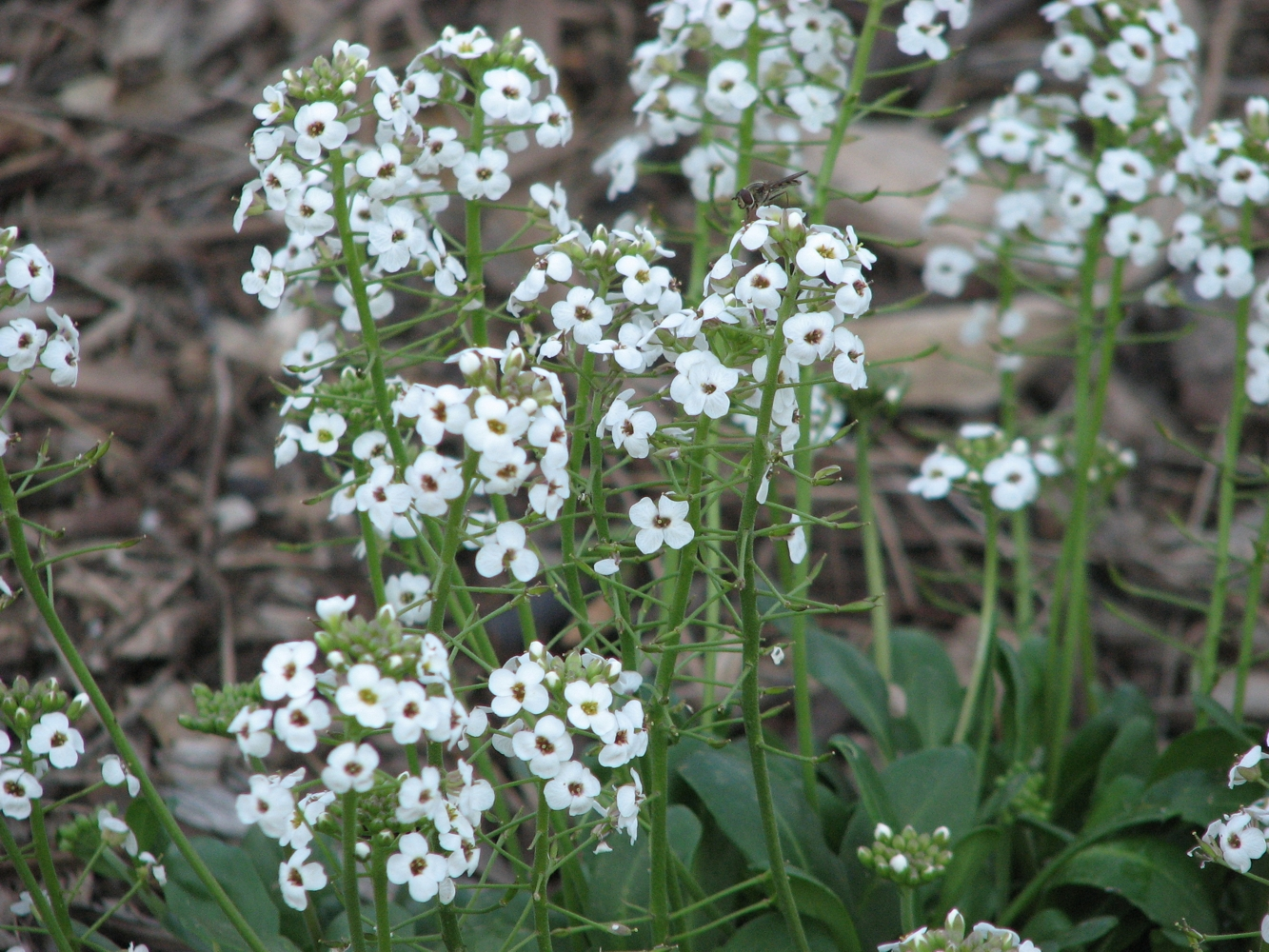

Scientific classification
- Kingdom: Plantae
- Clade: Tracheophytes
- Clade: Angiosperms
- Clade: Eudicots
- Clade: Rosids
- Order: Brassicales
- Family: Brassicaceae
- Genus: Drabastrum (F.Muell.) O.E.Schulz
- Species: D. alpestre

Binomial name
- Drabastrum alpestre (F.Muell.) O.E.Schulz

Synonyms
- Blennodia alpestris F.Muell.; Capsella blennodina F.Muell. nom. illeg.; Erysimum capsellinum F.Muell. nom. illeg.; Erysimum blennodinum (F.Muell.) Kuntze; Sisymbrium alpestre (F.Muell.) F.Muell.

= Drabastrum =

Genus of flowering plants

Drabastrum is a monotypic genus of herbs or subshrubs in the family Brassicaceae. The sole species is Drabastrum alpestre (Mountain Cress) which is native to New South Wales and Victoria in Australia.
