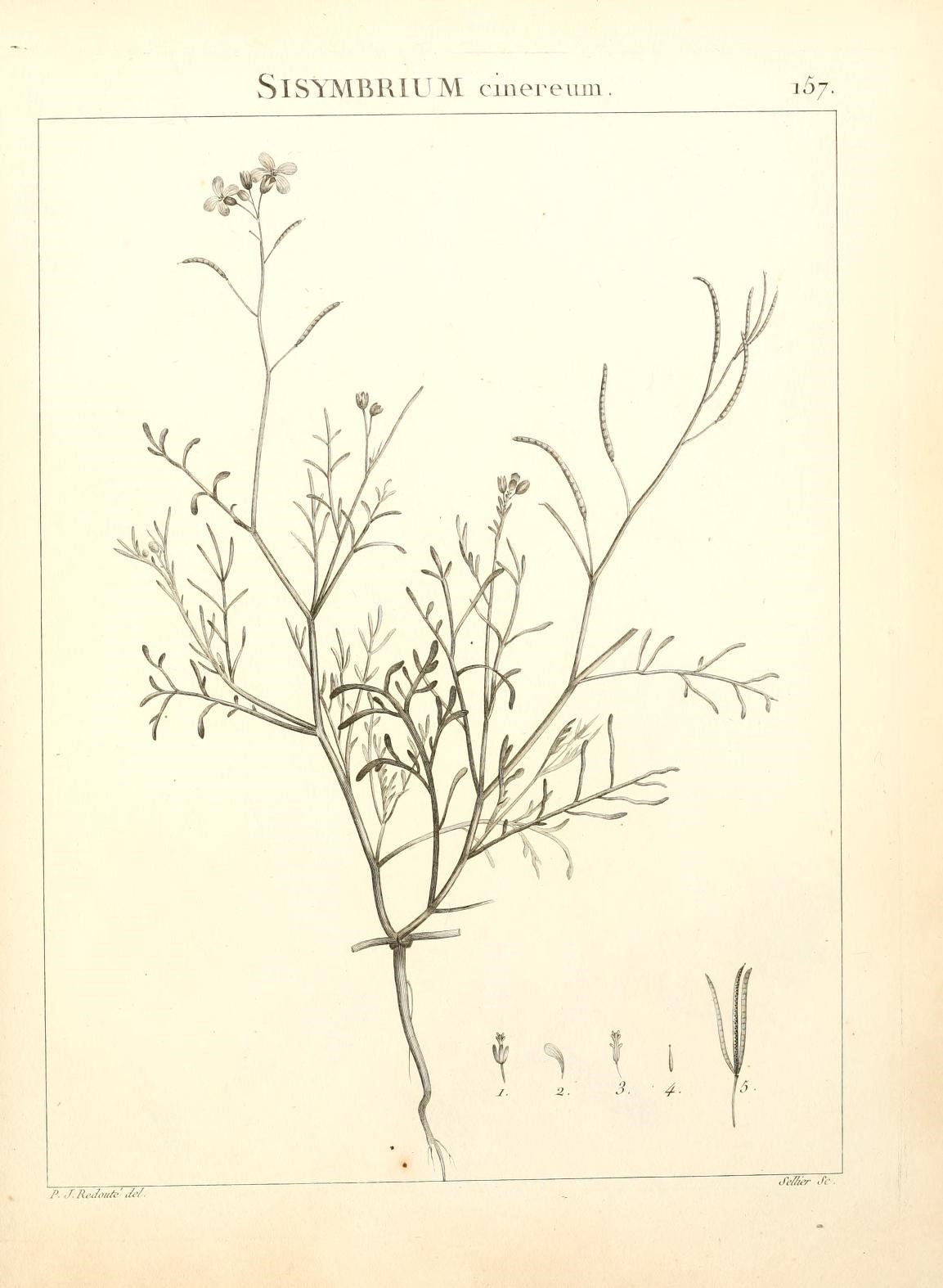
- Flora Atlantica, sive, Historia plantarum quae in Atlante, agro Tunetano et Algeriensi crescunt (Plate 157)

Scientific classification
- Kingdom: Plantae
- Clade: Tracheophytes
- Clade: Angiosperms
- Clade: Eudicots
- Clade: Rosids
- Order: Brassicales
- Family: Brassicaceae
- Genus: Ammosperma; Hook.f.

= Ammosperma =

Genus of flowering plants

Ammosperma is a genus of flowering plants belonging to the family Brassicaceae.

Its native range is Northern Africa.

Species:

- Ammosperma cinereum (Desf.) Baill.
- Ammosperma variabile Nègre & Le Houér.
