= Barbamine =

Scientific classification
- Kingdom: Plantae
- Clade: Tracheophytes
- Clade: Angiosperms
- Clade: Eudicots
- Clade: Rosids
- Order: Brassicales
- Family: Brassicaceae
- Genus: Barbamine; A.P.Khokhr.

Genus of flowering plants

Barbamine is a genus of flowering plants belonging to the family Brassicaceae.

Its native range is Turkey to Caucasus.

Species:

- Barbamine ketzkhovelii (Mardal.) A.P.Khokhr.
- Barbamine sachokiana (N.Busch) A.P.Khokhr.
