= Octoceras =

Scientific classification
- Kingdom: Plantae
- Clade: Tracheophytes
- Clade: Angiosperms
- Clade: Eudicots
- Clade: Rosids
- Order: Brassicales
- Family: Brassicaceae
- Genus: Octoceras; Bunge
- Species: O. lehmannianum

Binomial name
- Octoceras lehmannianum Bunge

Synonyms
- Octoceras lehmannianum var. stocksianum Boiss.

Genus of plants

Octoceras is a genus of flowering plants belonging to the family Brassicaceae. It includes a single species, Octoceras lehmannianum, an annual native to Iran, Afghanistan, Central Asia (Kazakhstan, Turkmenistan, and Uzbekistan), and western Pakistan.
