= Lycocarpus =

Scientific classification
- Kingdom: Plantae
- Clade: Tracheophytes
- Clade: Angiosperms
- Clade: Eudicots
- Clade: Rosids
- Order: Brassicales
- Family: Brassicaceae
- Genus: Lycocarpus; O.E.Schulz
- Species: L. fugax

Binomial name
- Lycocarpus fugax (Lag.) O.E.Schulz

Synonyms
- Hesperis fugax (Lag.) Kuntze; Lycocarpus fugax var. pubescens (Coss.) O.E.Schulz; Sisymbrium fugax Lag. (1816) (basionym); Sisymbrium fugax var. pubescens Coss.; Sisymbrium fugax var. xerophilum E.Fourn.

Genus of plants

Lycocarpus is a genus of flowering plants belonging to the family Brassicaceae. It includes a single species, Lycocarpus fugax, an annual native to southeastern Spain.
