= Cuprella =

Scientific classification
- Kingdom: Plantae
- Clade: Tracheophytes
- Clade: Angiosperms
- Clade: Eudicots
- Clade: Rosids
- Order: Brassicales
- Family: Brassicaceae
- Genus: Cuprella; Salmerón-Sánchez, Mota & Fuertes

Genus of flowering plants

Cuprella is a genus of flowering plants belonging to the family Brassicaceae.

Its native range is Northern Africa to Pakistan.

Species:

- Cuprella antiatlantica (Emb. & Maire) Salmerón-Sánchez, Mota & Fuertes
- Cuprella homalocarpa (Fisch. & C.A.Mey.) Salmerón-Sánchez, Mota & Fuertes
