= Eremophyton =

Scientific classification
- Kingdom: Plantae
- Clade: Tracheophytes
- Clade: Angiosperms
- Clade: Eudicots
- Clade: Rosids
- Order: Brassicales
- Family: Brassicaceae
- Genus: Eremophyton; Bég
- Species: E. chevallieri

Binomial name
- Eremophyton chevallieri (Barratte) Bég.

Synonyms
- Enarthrocarpus chevallieri Barratte

Genus of plants

Eremophyton is a genus of flowering plants belonging to the family Brassicaceae. It includes a single species, Eremophyton chevallieri, an annual native to the northern Sahara of Algeria, Libya, and Morocco.
