= Bengt-jonsellia =

Scientific classification
- Kingdom: Plantae
- Clade: Tracheophytes
- Clade: Angiosperms
- Clade: Eudicots
- Clade: Rosids
- Order: Brassicales
- Family: Brassicaceae
- Tribe: Cardamineae
- Genus: Bengt-jonsellia; Al-Shehbaz

Genus of flowering plants

Bengt-jonsellia is a genus of flowering plants belonging to the family Brassicaceae.

Its native range is Madagascar.

Species:

- Bengt-jonsellia laurentii (Jonsell) Al-Shehbaz
- Bengt-jonsellia tsaratananae (Jonsell) Al-Shehbaz
