= Aphragmus =

Scientific classification
- Kingdom: Plantae
- Clade: Tracheophytes
- Clade: Angiosperms
- Clade: Eudicots
- Clade: Rosids
- Order: Brassicales
- Family: Brassicaceae
- Genus: Aphragmus; Andrz. ex DC.

Genus of flowering plants

Aphragmus is a genus of flowering plants belonging to the family Brassicaceae.

Its native range is Southwestern Siberia to Himalaya and Aleutian Islands.

Species:

- Aphragmus bouffordii Al-Shehbaz
- Aphragmus eschscholtziana Andrz. ex DC.
- Aphragmus himalaicus O.E.Schulz
- Aphragmus hinkuensis (Kats.Arai, H.Ohba & Al-Shehbaz) Al-Shehbaz & Warwick
- Aphragmus hobsonii (H.Pearson) Al-Shehbaz & Warwick
- Aphragmus involucratus (Bunge) O.E.Schulz
- Aphragmus ladakianus Al-Shehbaz
- Aphragmus minutus (H.Hara) Al-Shehbaz, G.Q.Hao & J.Q.Liu
- Aphragmus nepalensis (H.Hara) Al-Shehbaz
- Aphragmus obscurus (Dunn) O.E.Schulz
- Aphragmus ohbana (Al-Shehbaz & Kats.Arai) Al-Shehbaz & Warwick
- Aphragmus oxycarpus (Hook.f. & Thomson) Jafri
- Aphragmus pygmaeus Al-Shehbaz
- Aphragmus serpens (W.W.Sm.) Al-Shehbaz & Warwick
