= Quidproquo =

Scientific classification
- Kingdom: Plantae
- Clade: Tracheophytes
- Clade: Angiosperms
- Clade: Eudicots
- Clade: Rosids
- Order: Brassicales
- Family: Brassicaceae
- Genus: Quidproquo; Greuter & Burdet
- Species: Q. confusum

Binomial name
- Quidproquo confusum Greuter & Burdet

Synonyms
- Raphanus confusus (Greuter & Burdet) Al-Shehbaz & Warwick

Species of flowering plant

Quidproquo is a genus of flowering plants in the family Brassicaceae. It contains a single species, Quidproquo confusum, an annual native to Israel, Lebanon, and southern Syria.
