= Pseuderucaria =

Scientific classification
- Kingdom: Plantae
- Clade: Tracheophytes
- Clade: Angiosperms
- Clade: Eudicots
- Clade: Rosids
- Order: Brassicales
- Family: Brassicaceae
- Genus: Pseuderucaria; O.E.Schulz

Genus of plants

Pseuderucaria is a genus of flowering plants belonging to the family Brassicaceae.

Its native range is Southern and Eastern Mediterranean.

Species:

- Pseuderucaria clavata (Boiss. & Reut.) O.E.Schulz
- Pseuderucaria teretifolia (Desf.) O.E.Schulz
