= Nevada holmgrenii =

Conservation status
- Vulnerable (NatureServe)

Scientific classification
- Kingdom: Plantae
- Clade: Tracheophytes
- Clade: Angiosperms
- Clade: Eudicots
- Clade: Rosids
- Order: Brassicales
- Family: Brassicaceae
- Genus: Nevada; N.H.Holmgren
- Species: N. holmgrenii

Binomial name
- Nevada holmgrenii (Rollins) N.H.Holmgren

Synonyms
- Smelowskia holmgrenii Rollins

Species of flowering plant

Nevada holmgrenii is a flowering plant in the mustard family, Brassicaceae, endemic to Nevada in the United States. It is the only species in the genus Nevada. It was first described as Smelowskia holmgrenii.
