= Microlepidium =

Scientific classification
- Kingdom: Plantae
- Clade: Tracheophytes
- Clade: Angiosperms
- Clade: Eudicots
- Clade: Rosids
- Order: Brassicales
- Family: Brassicaceae
- Genus: Microlepidium; F.Muell.

Genus of plants

Microlepidium is a genus of flowering plants belonging to the family Brassicaceae.

Its native range is Southern Australia.

== Species ==
Species:

- Microlepidium alatum (J.M.Black) E.A.Shaw
- Microlepidium pilosulum F.Muell.
