= Peltariopsis =

Scientific classification
- Kingdom: Plantae
- Clade: Tracheophytes
- Clade: Angiosperms
- Clade: Eudicots
- Clade: Rosids
- Order: Brassicales
- Family: Brassicaceae
- Genus: Peltariopsis (Boiss.) N.Busch

Genus of plants

Peltariopsis is a genus of flowering plants belonging to the family Brassicaceae.

Its native range is Turkey to Iran.

Species:

- Peltariopsis drabicarpa (Boiss.) N.Busch
- Peltariopsis grossheimii N.Busch
- Peltariopsis planisiliqua (Boiss.) N.Busch
