= Calymmatium =

Scientific classification
- Kingdom: Plantae
- Clade: Tracheophytes
- Clade: Angiosperms
- Clade: Eudicots
- Clade: Rosids
- Order: Brassicales
- Family: Brassicaceae
- Genus: Calymmatium; O.E.Schulz

Synonyms
- Nasturtiicarpa Gilli

Genus of flowering plants

Calymmatium is a genus of flowering plants belonging to the family Brassicaceae. It includes two species native to Afghanistan and Tajikistan.

- Calymmatium draboides (Korsh.) O.E.Schulz – Tajikistan (Pamir Mountains)
- Calymmatium notorrhizum (Gilli) Botsch. – eastern Afghanistan
