= Exhalimolobos =

Scientific classification
- Kingdom: Plantae
- Clade: Tracheophytes
- Clade: Angiosperms
- Clade: Eudicots
- Clade: Rosids
- Order: Brassicales
- Family: Brassicaceae
- Genus: Exhalimolobos; Al-Shehbaz & C.D.Bailey

Genus of plants

Exhalimolobos is a genus of flowering plants belonging to the family Brassicaceae.

Its native range is Mexico and western and southern South America.

== Species ==
Nine species are accepted:

- Exhalimolobos arabioides (Muschl.) Al-Shehbaz & C.D.Bailey
- Exhalimolobos berlandieri (E.Fourn.) Al-Shehbaz & C.D.Bailey
- Exhalimolobos burkartii (Romanczuk & Boelcke) Al-Shehbaz & C.D.Bailey
- Exhalimolobos hispidulus (DC.) Al-Shehbaz & C.D.Bailey
- Exhalimolobos palmeri (Hemsl.) Al-Shehbaz & C.D.Bailey
- Exhalimolobos parryi (Hemsl.) Al-Shehbaz & C.D.Bailey
- Exhalimolobos pazensis (Rusby) Al-Shehbaz & C.D.Bailey
- Exhalimolobos polyspermus (E.Fourn.) Al-Shehbaz & C.D.Bailey
- Exhalimolobos weddellii (E.Fourn.) Al-Shehbaz & C.D.Bailey
