= Gongylis =

Conservation status
- Endangered (IUCN 3.1)

Scientific classification
- Kingdom: Plantae
- Clade: Tracheophytes
- Clade: Angiosperms
- Clade: Eudicots
- Clade: Rosids
- Order: Brassicales
- Family: Brassicaceae
- Genus: Gongylis; Theophr. ex Molinari & Sánchez Och.
- Species: G. peruviana

Binomial name
- Gongylis peruviana (Al-Shehbaz, Ed.Navarro & A.Cano) Sánchez Och. & Molinari

Synonyms
- Aschersoniodoxa peruviana Al-Shehbaz, Ed.Navarro & A.Cano

Genus of plants

Gongylis is a genus of flowering plants belonging to the family Brassicaceae. It includes a single species, Gongylis peruviana, a perennial or subshrub endemic to Lima Department in western Peru.

It inhabits high elevations in the central Andes from 4,500 to 4,800 meters elevation, where it grows in loose rocky soils which freeze and thaw frequently. It is locally rare and known from fewer than ten locations. It is threatened by habitat degradation from mining activities, and is assessed as endangered by the IUCN Red List.
