= Dipoma =

Scientific classification
- Kingdom: Plantae
- Clade: Tracheophytes
- Clade: Angiosperms
- Clade: Eudicots
- Clade: Rosids
- Order: Brassicales
- Family: Brassicaceae
- Genus: Dipoma; Franch.
- Species: D. iberideum

Binomial name
- Dipoma iberideum Franch.

Synonyms
- Dipoma iberideum var. dasycarpum O.E.Schulz; Dipoma iberideum f. pilosius O.E.Schulz

Genus of plants

Dipoma is a genus of flowering plants belonging to the family Brassicaceae. It includes a single species, Dipoma iberideum, a perennial native to Sichuan and Yunnan provinces of south-central China.
