= Eremoblastus =

Scientific classification
- Kingdom: Plantae
- Clade: Tracheophytes
- Clade: Angiosperms
- Clade: Eudicots
- Clade: Rosids
- Order: Brassicales
- Family: Brassicaceae
- Genus: Eremoblastus; Botch.
- Species: E. caspicus

Binomial name
- Eremoblastus caspicus Botch.

Genus of plants

Eremoblastus is a genus of flowering plants belonging to the family Brassicaceae. It includes a single species, Eremoblastus caspicus, an annual native to Kazakhstan.
