= Streptoloma =

Scientific classification
- Kingdom: Plantae
- Clade: Tracheophytes
- Clade: Angiosperms
- Clade: Eudicots
- Clade: Rosids
- Order: Brassicales
- Family: Brassicaceae
- Genus: Streptoloma; Bunge

Genus of plants

Streptoloma is a genus of flowering plants belonging to the family Brassicaceae.

Its native range is Iran to Central Asia and Afghanistan.

Species:

- Streptoloma desertorum Bunge
- Streptoloma sumbarense (Lipsky) Botsch.
