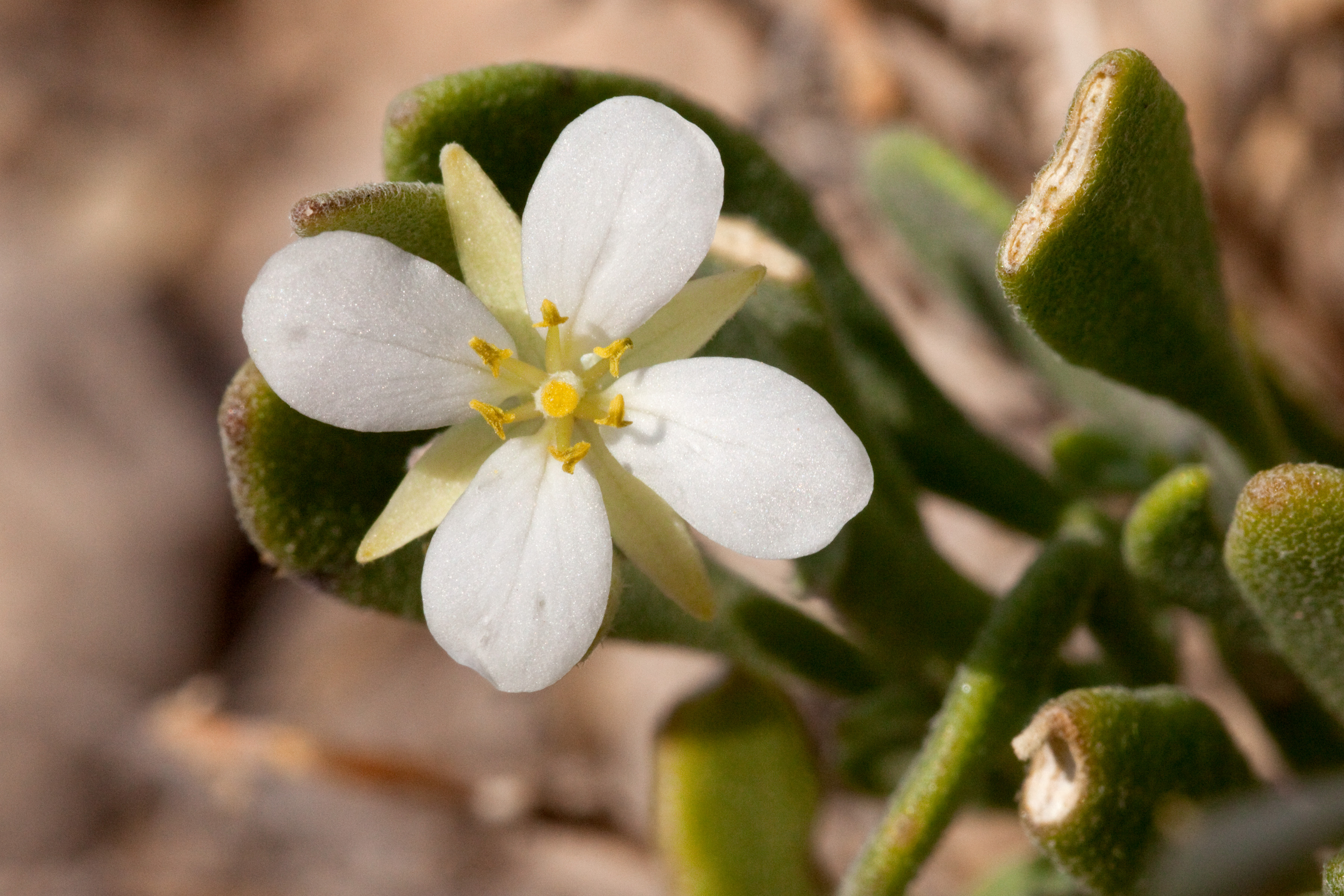
- Nerisyrenia hypercorax

Scientific classification
- Kingdom: Plantae
- Clade: Tracheophytes
- Clade: Angiosperms
- Clade: Eudicots
- Clade: Rosids
- Order: Brassicales
- Family: Brassicaceae
- Genus: Nerisyrenia; Greene

= Nerisyrenia =

Genus of plants

Nerisyrenia is a genus of flowering plants belonging to the family Brassicaceae.

Its native range is from the southern-central United States to north-eastern Mexico.

== Species ==
The following species are recognised in the genus Nerisyrenia:

- Nerisyrenia baconiana B.L.Turner
- Nerisyrenia camporum (A.Gray) Greene
- Nerisyrenia castillonii Rollins
- Nerisyrenia gracilis I.M.Johnst.
- Nerisyrenia gypsophila J.D.Bacon
- Nerisyrenia hypercorax P.J.Alexander & M.J.Moore
- Nerisyrenia incana Rollins
- Nerisyrenia johnstonii J.D.Bacon
- Nerisyrenia linearifolia (S.Watson) Greene
- Nerisyrenia mexicana (J.D.Bacon) B.L.Turner
- Nerisyrenia powellii J.D.Bacon
