= Guiraoa =

Scientific classification
- Kingdom: Plantae
- Clade: Tracheophytes
- Clade: Angiosperms
- Clade: Eudicots
- Clade: Rosids
- Order: Brassicales
- Family: Brassicaceae
- Genus: Guiraoa; Coss.
- Species: G. arvensis

Binomial name
- Guiraoa arvensis Coss.

Genus of plants

Guiraoa is a monotypic genus of flowering plants belonging to the family Brassicaceae. It contains a single species, Guiraoa arvensis, an annual native to eastern and southeastern Spain.

The genus and species were first described and published by Ernest Cosson in 1851 in Notes Pl. Crit. on page 98. The genus name of Guiraoa is in honour of Ángel Guirao y Navarro (1817–1890), Spanish doctor, naturalist and politician from Murcia who discovered this plant. The Latin specific epithet of arvensis refers to arvum of ploughed fields or ploughed land.
