= Sinoarabis =

Scientific classification
- Kingdom: Plantae
- Clade: Tracheophytes
- Clade: Angiosperms
- Clade: Eudicots
- Clade: Rosids
- Order: Brassicales
- Family: Brassicaceae
- Tribe: Arabideae
- Genus: Sinoarabis; R.Karl, D.A.German, M.Koch & Al-Shehbaz
- Species: S. setosifolia

Binomial name
- Sinoarabis setosifolia (Al-Shehbaz) R.Karl, D.A.German, M.Koch & Al-Shehbaz

Synonyms
- Arabis setosifolia Al-Shehbaz

Genus of flowering plants

Sinoarabis is a genus of flowering plants in the family Brassicaceae. It includes a single species, Sinoarabis setosifolia, a perennial endemic to Tibet.
