= Pterygostemon =

Scientific classification
- Kingdom: Plantae
- Clade: Tracheophytes
- Clade: Angiosperms
- Clade: Eudicots
- Clade: Rosids
- Order: Brassicales
- Family: Brassicaceae
- Genus: Pterygostemon; V.V.Botschantz.
- Species: P. spathulatus

Binomial name
- Pterygostemon spathulatus (Kar. & Kir.) V.V.Botschantz.

Synonyms
- Asterotricha V.V.Botschantz.; Asterotricha spathulata (Kar. & Kir.) V.V.Botschantz.; Farsetia spathulata Kar. & Kir. (1842) (basionym); Fibigia spathulata (Kar. & Kir.) B.Fedtsch.

Genus of plants

Pterygostemon is a genus of flowering plants belonging to the family Brassicaceae. It includes a single species, Pterygostemon spathulatus, which is native to Kazakhstan and Xinjiang.
