= Pycnoplinthopsis =

Scientific classification
- Kingdom: Plantae
- Clade: Tracheophytes
- Clade: Angiosperms
- Clade: Eudicots
- Clade: Rosids
- Order: Brassicales
- Family: Brassicaceae
- Genus: Pycnoplinthopsis; Jafri
- Species: P. bhutanica

Binomial name
- Pycnoplinthopsis bhutanica Jafri

Synonyms
- Lepidostemon bhutanicus (Jafri) Y.Z.Zhao; Pegaeophyton bhutanicum H.Hara; Pycnoplinthopsis minor Jafri

Genus of flowering plants

Pycnoplinthopsis is a genus of flowering plants belonging to the family Brassicaceae. It includes a single species, Pycnoplinthopsis bhutanica, a perennial or subshrub native to subalpine areas of the Himalaya and Tibet.
