= Chrysochamela =

Scientific classification
- Kingdom: Plantae
- Clade: Tracheophytes
- Clade: Angiosperms
- Clade: Eudicots
- Clade: Rosids
- Order: Brassicales
- Family: Brassicaceae
- Genus: Chrysochamela (Fenzl) Boiss.

Genus of flowering plants

Chrysochamela is a genus of flowering plants belonging to the family Brassicaceae.

Its native range is Turkey to Syria.

Species:

- Chrysochamela draboides Woronow
- Chrysochamela elliptica (Boiss.) Boiss.
- Chrysochamela noeana (Boiss.) Boiss.
- Chrysochamela velutina (DC.) Boiss.
