= Camelinopsis =

Scientific classification
- Kingdom: Plantae
- Clade: Tracheophytes
- Clade: Angiosperms
- Clade: Eudicots
- Clade: Rosids
- Order: Brassicales
- Family: Brassicaceae
- Tribe: Thlaspideae
- Genus: Camelinopsis; A.G.Mill.

Type species
- Camelinopsis campylopoda (Bornm. & Gauba) A.G.Mill.

Species
- Camelinopsis alborzica Doostm.; Camelinopsis campylopoda (Bornm. & Gauba) A.G.Mill.

Genus of flowering plants

Camelinopsis is a genus of flowering plants in the family Brassicaceae. It includes two species native to northern Iraq and Iran.

- Camelinopsis alborzica Doostm. – northern Iran (western Alborz Mountains)
- Camelinopsis campylopoda (Bornm. & Gauba) A.G.Mill. – west-central Iran and northern Iraq

Camelinopsis kurdica (A.G.Mill.) Al-Shehbaz & A.G.Mill. is now placed in genus Pseudocamelina as Pseudocamelina kurdica (A.G.Mill.) Esmailbegi & Al-Shehbaz.
