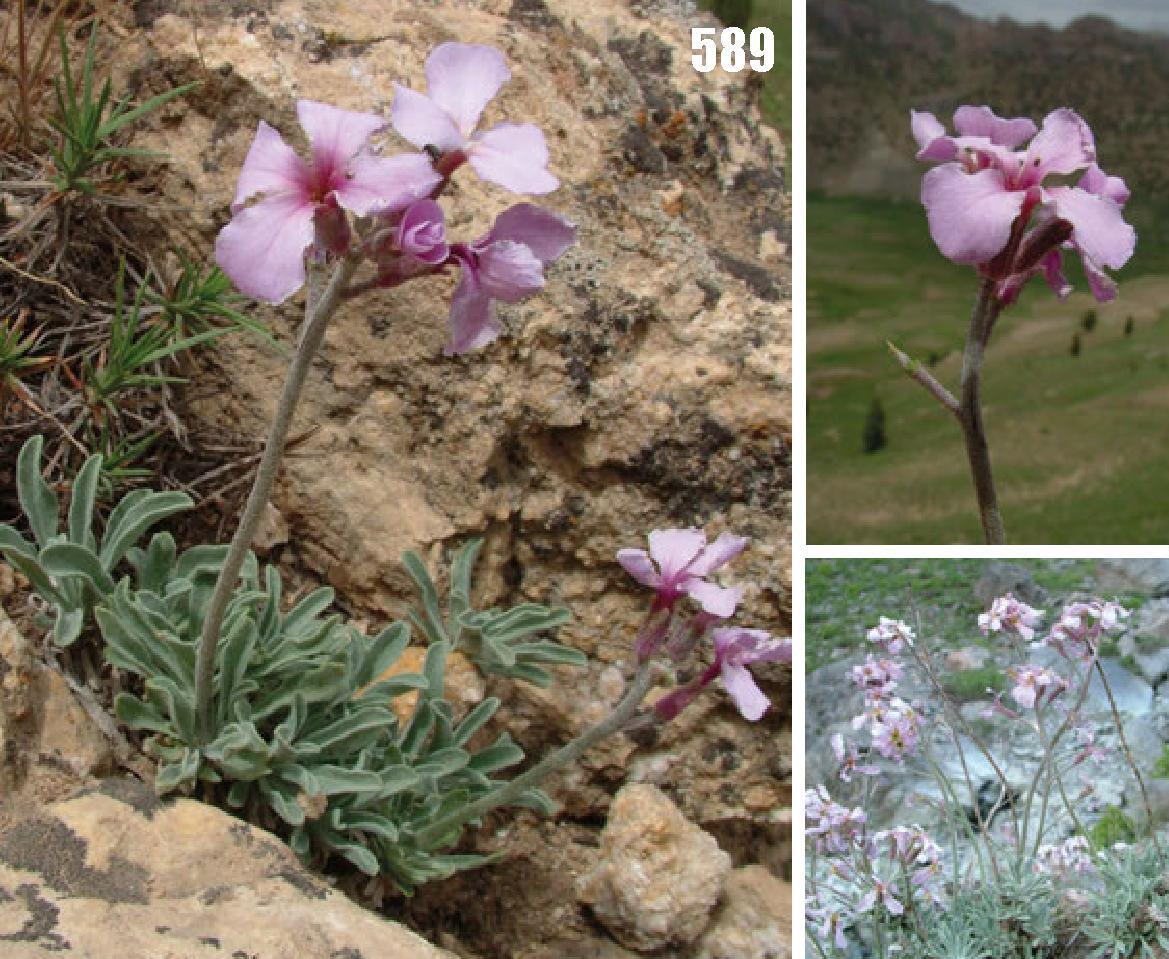
- Iskandera hissarica

Scientific classification
- Kingdom: Plantae
- Clade: Tracheophytes
- Clade: Angiosperms
- Clade: Eudicots
- Clade: Rosids
- Order: Brassicales
- Family: Brassicaceae
- Genus: Iskandera; N.Busch
- Species: I. hissarica

Binomial name
- Iskandera hissarica N.Busch

= Iskandera =

Genus of plants

Iskandera is a genus of flowering plants belonging to the family Brassicaceae. It includes a single species, Iskandera hissarica, which is native to Tajikistan and Uzbekistan.
