= Sisymbriopsis =

Scientific classification
- Kingdom: Plantae
- Clade: Tracheophytes
- Clade: Angiosperms
- Clade: Eudicots
- Clade: Rosids
- Order: Brassicales
- Family: Brassicaceae
- Tribe: Euclidieae
- Genus: Sisymbriopsis; Botsch. & Tzvelev

Species
- See text

Genus of plants in the cabbage family

Sisymbriopsis is a genus of flowering plants in the crucifer family Brassicaceae, native to Central Asia and western China. They may have diversified due to mountain uplift.

== Species ==
Currently accepted species include:

- Sisymbriopsis mollipila (Maxim.) Botsch.
- Sisymbriopsis pamirica (Y.Z.Lan & C.H.An) Al-Shehbaz, C.H.An & G.Yang
- Sisymbriopsis schugnana Botsch. & Tzvelev
- Sisymbriopsis shuanghuica (K.C.Kuan & C.H.An) Al-Shehbaz, C.H.An & G.Yang
