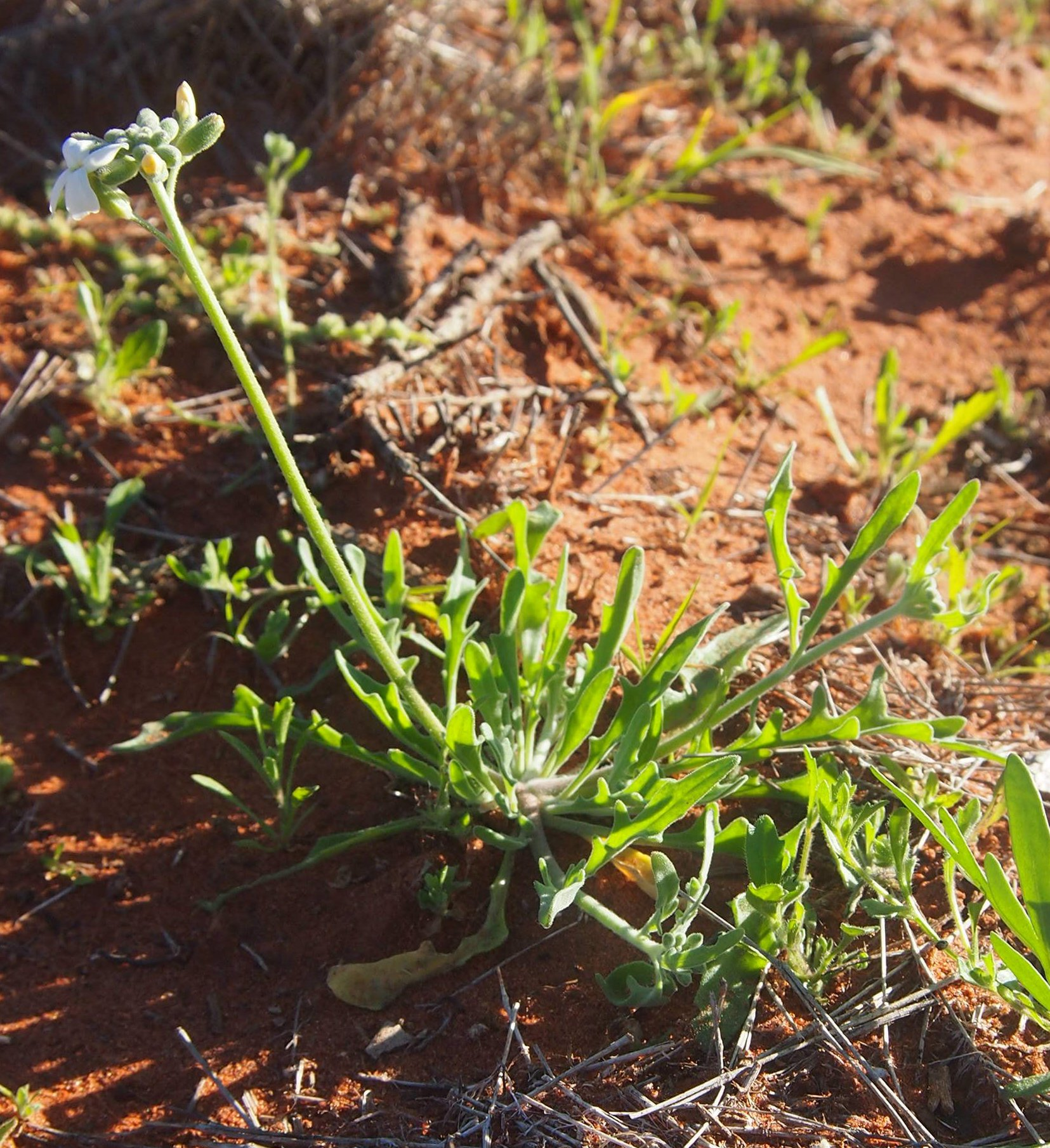
- Blennodia canescens

Scientific classification
- Kingdom: Plantae
- Clade: Embryophytes
- Clade: Tracheophytes
- Clade: Spermatophytes
- Clade: Angiosperms
- Clade: Eudicots
- Clade: Rosids
- Order: Brassicales
- Family: Brassicaceae
- Genus: Blennodia; R.Br.

= Blennodia =

Genus of flowering plants

Blennodia is a genus of flowering plants belonging to the family Brassicaceae.

Its native range is Australia.

Species:

- Blennodia canescens R.Br.
- Blennodia pterosperma (J.M.Black) J.M.Black
