= Ladakiella =

Scientific classification
- Kingdom: Plantae
- Clade: Tracheophytes
- Clade: Angiosperms
- Clade: Eudicots
- Clade: Rosids
- Order: Brassicales
- Family: Brassicaceae
- Tribe: Crucihimalayeae
- Genus: Ladakiella; D.A.German & Al-Shehbaz
- Species: L. klimesii

Binomial name
- Ladakiella klimesii (Al-Shehbaz) D.A.German & Al-Shehbaz

Synonyms
- Alyssum klimesii Al-Shehbaz

Genus of flowering plants

Ladakiella is a genus of flowering plants in the family Brassicaceae. It includes a single species, Ladakiella klimesii, which is native to the western Himalayas and Tibet where it grows in subalpine habitats.
