= Petiniotia =

Scientific classification
- Kingdom: Plantae
- Clade: Tracheophytes
- Clade: Angiosperms
- Clade: Eudicots
- Clade: Rosids
- Order: Brassicales
- Family: Brassicaceae
- Genus: Petiniotia; J.Léonard

Synonyms
- Sterigma purpurascens Boiss.; Sterigmostemum purpurascens (Boiss.) Kuntze; Sterigmostemum rhodanthum Rech.f., Aellen & Esfand.

Species of flowering plant

Petiniotia is a monotypic genus of flowering plants belonging to the family Brassicaceae. It only contains one known species, Petiniotia purpurascens (Boiss.) J.Léonard

It is native to Afghanistan, Iran and Pakistan.

The genus name of Petiniotia is in honour of Richard Petiniot (died before 1980), a Belgian air force officer in the Sahara and Iran. The Latin specific epithet of purpurascens means somewhat purple. Both the genus and the species were first described and published in Bull. Jard. Bot. Natl. Belg. Vol.50 on page 228-230 in 1980.
