= Raphanorhyncha =

Scientific classification
- Kingdom: Plantae
- Clade: Tracheophytes
- Clade: Angiosperms
- Clade: Eudicots
- Clade: Rosids
- Order: Brassicales
- Family: Brassicaceae
- Genus: Raphanorhyncha; Rollins
- Species: R. crassa

Binomial name
- Raphanorhyncha crassa Rollins

Genus of plants

Raphanorhyncha is a genus of flowering plants belonging to the family Brassicaceae. It includes a single species, Raphanorhyncha crassa, which is endemic to Chihuahua state in northeastern Mexico, where it grows in deserts and dry shrublands.
