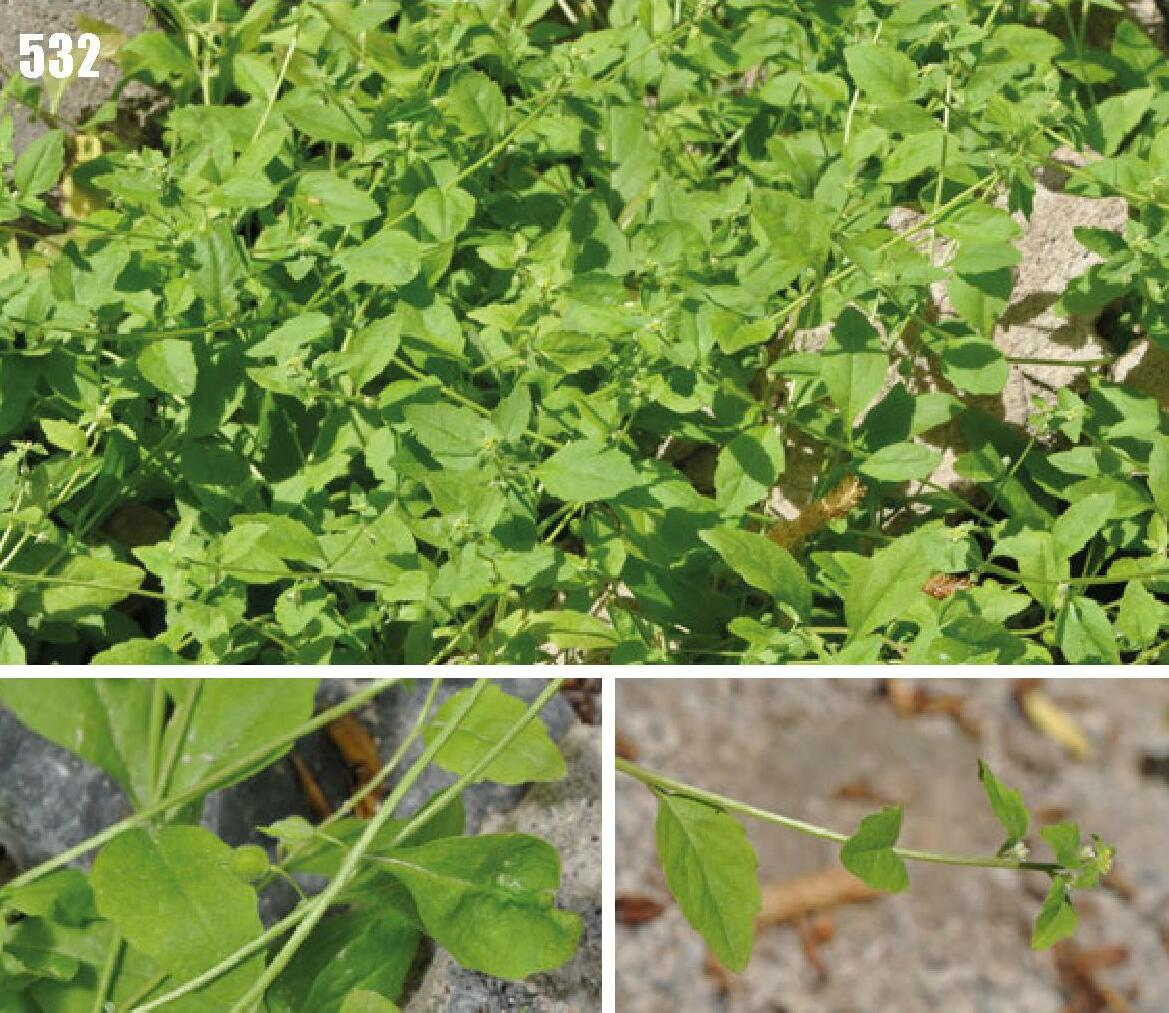

Scientific classification
- Kingdom: Plantae
- Clade: Tracheophytes
- Clade: Angiosperms
- Clade: Eudicots
- Clade: Rosids
- Order: Brassicales
- Family: Brassicaceae
- Genus: Asperuginoides; Rauschert
- Species: A. axillaris

Binomial name
- Asperuginoides axillaris (Boiss. & Hohen.) Rauschert

Synonyms
- Buchingera Boiss. & Hohen.; Buchingera axillaris Boiss. & Hohen.

= Asperuginoides =

Genus of flowering plants

Asperuginoides is a genus of flowering plants belonging to the family Brassicaceae. It includes a single species, Asperuginoides axillaris, an annual which ranges from the southern Transcaucasus to Iran, Afghanistan, Central Asia, Pakistan, and the western Himalaya.
