= Phlegmatospermum =

Scientific classification
- Kingdom: Plantae
- Clade: Tracheophytes
- Clade: Angiosperms
- Clade: Eudicots
- Clade: Rosids
- Order: Brassicales
- Family: Brassicaceae
- Genus: Phlegmatospermum; O.E.Schulz

Genus of plants

Phlegmatospermum is a genus of flowering plants belonging to the family Brassicaceae.

Its native range is Southern Australia.

Species:

- Phlegmatospermum cochlearinum (F.Muell.) O.E.Schulz
- Phlegmatospermum drummondii (Benth.) O.E.Schulz
- Phlegmatospermum eremaeum (J.M.Black) E.A.Shaw
- Phlegmatospermum richardsii (F.Muell.) E.A.Shaw
