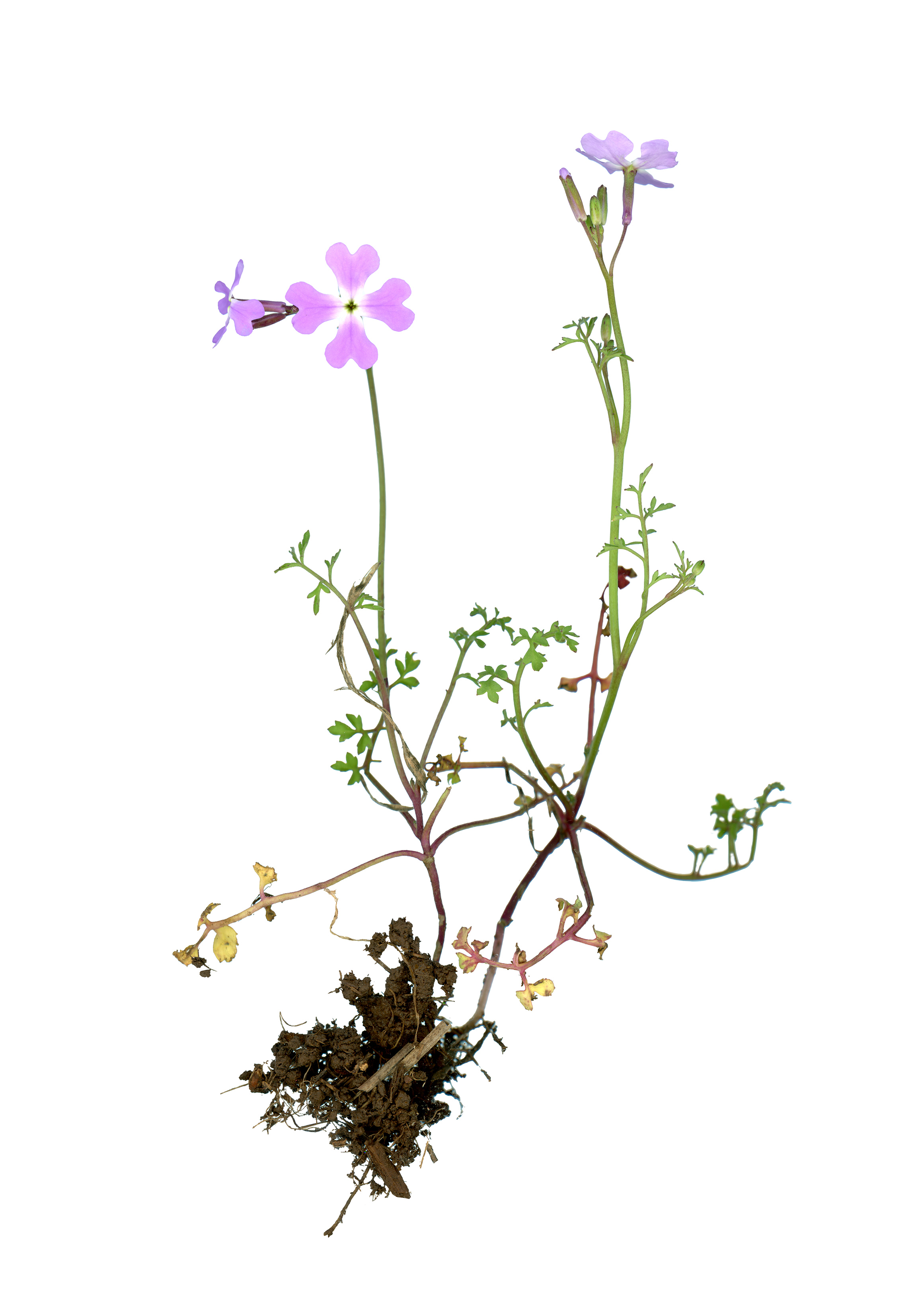
- Ricotia lunaria

Scientific classification
- Kingdom: Plantae
- Clade: Tracheophytes
- Clade: Angiosperms
- Clade: Eudicots
- Clade: Rosids
- Order: Brassicales
- Family: Brassicaceae
- Tribe: Biscutelleae
- Genus: Ricotia; L.

Species
- See text

Synonyms
- Notarisia Pestal. ex Ces.; Scopolia Adans.

= Ricotia =

Genus of flowering plants

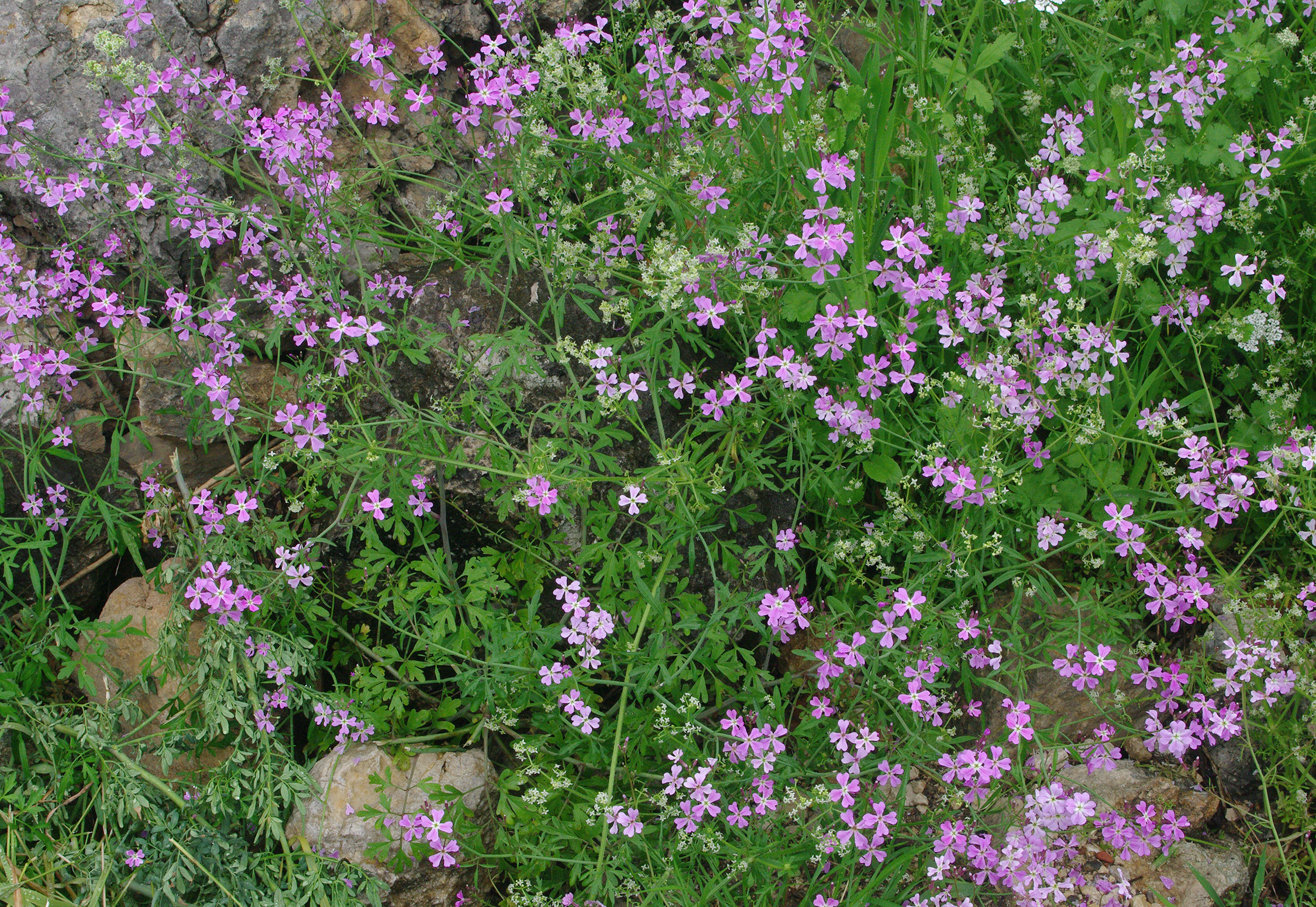
Ricotia sinuata

Ricotia is a genus of flowering plants in the family Brassicaceae, found in the East Aegean islands, Crete, the Levant, the Sinai Peninsula, Turkey, and the Transcaucasus. They appear to have arisen in Anatolia, to which five species are endemic.

== Species ==
Currently accepted species include:

- Ricotia aucheri (Boiss.) B.L.Burtt
- Ricotia candiriana Özçandır, Aykurt & Özüdoğru
- Ricotia carnosula Boiss. & Heldr.
- Ricotia cretica Boiss. & Heldr.
- Ricotia davisiana B.L.Burtt
- Ricotia isatoides (Barbey) B.L.Burtt
- Ricotia lunaria (L.) DC.
- Ricotia sinuata Boiss. & Heldr.
- Ricotia tenuifolia Sm.
- Ricotia varians B.L.Burtt
