= Physorhynchus =

Scientific classification
- Kingdom: Plantae
- Clade: Tracheophytes
- Clade: Angiosperms
- Clade: Eudicots
- Clade: Rosids
- Order: Brassicales
- Family: Brassicaceae
- Genus: Physorhynchus; Hook.

Genus of plants

Physorhynchus is a genus of flowering plants belonging to the family Brassicaceae.

Its native range is Iran to Pakistan and Arabian Peninsula.

Species:

- Physorhynchus brahuicus Hook.
- Physorhynchus chamaerapistrum (Boiss.) Boiss.
