= Stenodrabopsis =

Scientific classification
- Kingdom: Plantae
- Clade: Tracheophytes
- Clade: Angiosperms
- Clade: Eudicots
- Clade: Rosids
- Order: Brassicales
- Family: Brassicaceae
- Tribe: Eudemeae
- Genus: Stenodrabopsis; Al-Shehbaz, Salariato, A.Cano & Zuloaga

Species
- Stenodrabopsis imbricatifolia (Barnéoud) Al-Shehbaz, Salariato, A.Cano & Zuloaga; Stenodrabopsis lagunae (O.E.Schulz) Al-Shehbaz, Salariato, A.Cano & Zuloaga; Stenodrabopsis suffruticosa (Barnéoud) Al-Shehbaz, Salariato, A.Cano & Zuloaga

Genus of flowering plants

Stenodrabopsis is a genus of flowering plants in the family Brassicaceae. It includes three species native to the Andes of northwestern Argentina and northern and central Chile, where it grows in subalpine habitats.

- Stenodrabopsis imbricatifolia (Barnéoud) Al-Shehbaz, Salariato, A.Cano & Zuloaga – northwestern Argentina and northern and central Chile
- Stenodrabopsis lagunae (O.E.Schulz) Al-Shehbaz, Salariato, A.Cano & Zuloaga – northern Chile (Atacama region)
- Stenodrabopsis suffruticosa (Barnéoud) Al-Shehbaz, Salariato, A.Cano & Zuloaga – central Chile
