= Machaerophorus =

Scientific classification
- Kingdom: Plantae
- Clade: Tracheophytes
- Clade: Angiosperms
- Clade: Eudicots
- Clade: Rosids
- Order: Brassicales
- Family: Brassicaceae
- Genus: Machaerophorus; Schltdl.

Genus of plants

Machaerophorus is a genus of flowering plants belonging to the family Brassicaceae.

Its native range is Peru.

== Species ==
Species:

- Machaerophorus arequipa Al-Shehbaz, A.Cano, M.A.Cueva & Salariato
- Machaerophorus laticarpus Al-Shehbaz, A.Cano, M.A.Cueva & Salariato
- Machaerophorus matthioloides Schltdl.
