= Glastaria =

Scientific classification
- Kingdom: Plantae
- Clade: Tracheophytes
- Clade: Angiosperms
- Clade: Eudicots
- Clade: Rosids
- Order: Brassicales
- Family: Brassicaceae
- Genus: Glastaria; Boiss.
- Species: G. glastifolia

Binomial name
- Glastaria glastifolia (DC.) Kuntze

Synonyms
- Texiera Jaub. & Spach; Glastaria deflexa (DC.) Boiss.; Peltaria deflexa DC.; Peltaria glastifolia DC. (1821); Texiera glastifolia (DC.) Jaub. & Spach

Genus of plants

Glastaria is a monotypic genus of flowering plants belonging to the family Brassicaceae. It only contains a single species, Glastaria glastifolia. It is an annual which ranges from southeastern Turkey through Lebanon and Syria to Jordan and northern Iraq.

The species was first described as Peltaria deflexa by Augustin Pyramus de Candolle in 1821. In 1891 Otto Kuntze placed the species in genus Glastaria, which had been described by Pierre Edmond Boissier in 1841.
