= Pulvinatusia =

Scientific classification
- Kingdom: Plantae
- Clade: Tracheophytes
- Clade: Angiosperms
- Clade: Eudicots
- Clade: Rosids
- Order: Brassicales
- Family: Brassicaceae
- Tribe: Crucihimalayeae
- Genus: Pulvinatusia; J.P.Yue, H.L.Chen, Al-Shehbaz & H.Sun
- Species: P. xuegulaensis

Binomial name
- Pulvinatusia xuegulaensis J.P.Yue, H.L.Chen, Al-Shehbaz & H.Sun

Genus of flowering plants

Pulvinatusia is a genus of flowering plants in the family Brassicaceae. It includes a single species, Pulvinatusia xuegulaensis, which is endemic to Tibet. The genus and species were described in 2022.
