= Ornithocarpa =

Scientific classification
- Kingdom: Plantae
- Clade: Tracheophytes
- Clade: Angiosperms
- Clade: Eudicots
- Clade: Rosids
- Order: Brassicales
- Family: Brassicaceae
- Genus: Ornithocarpa; Rose

Genus of plants

Ornithocarpa is a genus of flowering plants belonging to the family Brassicaceae.

Its native range is Northern and Western Mexico.

Species:

- Ornithocarpa fimbriata Rose
- Ornithocarpa torulosa Rollins
