= Dichasianthus =

Scientific classification
- Kingdom: Plantae
- Clade: Tracheophytes
- Clade: Angiosperms
- Clade: Eudicots
- Clade: Rosids
- Order: Brassicales
- Family: Brassicaceae
- Genus: Dichasianthus; Ovcz. & Yunusov

Genus of plants

Dichasianthus is a genus of flowering plants belonging to the family Brassicaceae.

Its native range is Central Asia.

Species:

- Dichasianthus confertus (Steven ex Turcz.) V.I.Dorof.
- Dichasianthus runcinatus (Lag. ex DC.) V.I.Dorof.
- Dichasianthus subtilissimus (Popov) Ovcz. & Yunusov
