= Sisymbrella =

Scientific classification
- Kingdom: Plantae
- Clade: Tracheophytes
- Clade: Angiosperms
- Clade: Eudicots
- Clade: Rosids
- Order: Brassicales
- Family: Brassicaceae
- Genus: Sisymbrella; Spach

Genus of plants

Sisymbrella is a genus of flowering plants belonging to the family Brassicaceae.

Its native range is Western and Central Mediterranean.

Species:

- Sisymbrella aspera (L.) Spach
- Sisymbrella dentata (L.) O.E.Schulz
