= Catenulina =

Scientific classification
- Kingdom: Plantae
- Clade: Tracheophytes
- Clade: Angiosperms
- Clade: Eudicots
- Clade: Rosids
- Order: Brassicales
- Family: Brassicaceae
- Genus: Catenulina; Soják
- Species: C. hedysaroides

Binomial name
- Catenulina hedysaroides (Botsch.) Soják

Synonyms
- Catenularia Botsch.; Chodsha-kasiana Rauschert; Catenularia hedysaroides Botsch.; Chodsha-kasiana hedysaroides (Botsch.) Rauschert

Genus of flowering plants

Catenulina is a genus of flowering plants belonging to the family Brassicaceae. It includes a single species, Catenulina hedysaroides, which is endemic to Tajikistan.
