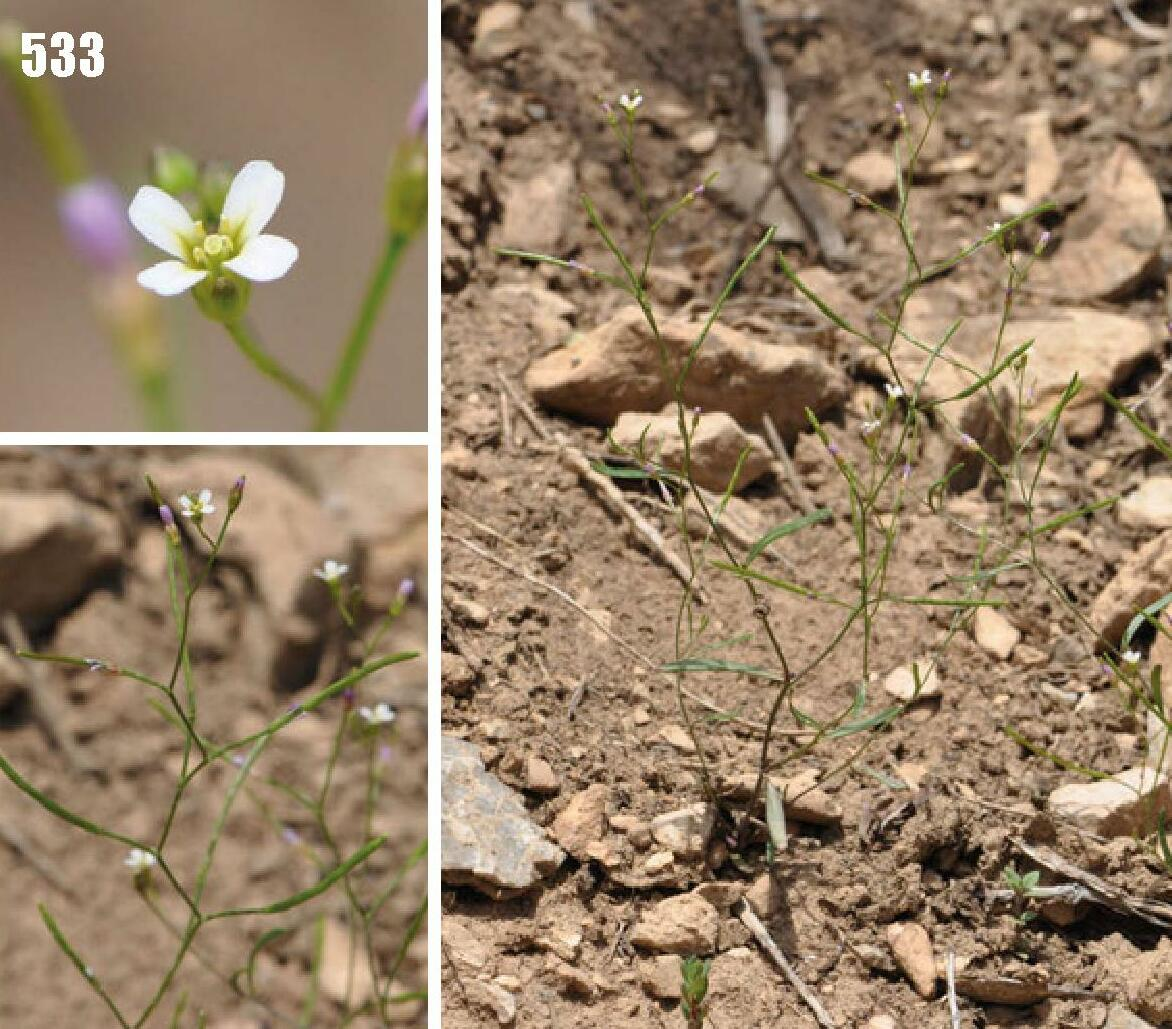

Scientific classification
- Kingdom: Plantae
- Clade: Tracheophytes
- Clade: Angiosperms
- Clade: Eudicots
- Clade: Rosids
- Order: Brassicales
- Family: Brassicaceae
- Genus: Atelanthera; Hook.f. & Thomson
- Species: A. perpusilla

Binomial name
- Atelanthera perpusilla Hook.f. & Thomson

Synonyms
- Atelanthera contorta Gilli; Atelanthera pentandra Jafri

= Atelanthera =

Genus of flowering plants

Atelanthera is a genus of flowering plants belonging to the family Brassicaceae. It includes a single species, Atelanthera perpusilla, an annual native to Afghanistan, Kirgizstan, Pakistan, Tadzhikistan, Tibet, Uzbekistan, and the West Himalayas.
