= Zahora ait-atta =

Scientific classification
- Kingdom: Plantae
- Clade: Tracheophytes
- Clade: Angiosperms
- Clade: Eudicots
- Clade: Rosids
- Order: Brassicales
- Family: Brassicaceae
- Genus: Zahora; Lemmel & M.Koch
- Species: Z. ait-atta

Binomial name
- Zahora ait-atta Lemmel & M.Koch

Species of flowering plant

Zahora ait-atta is a species of flowering plant belonging to the family Brassicaceae. It is the sole species in genus Zahora. It is endemic to Morocco.
