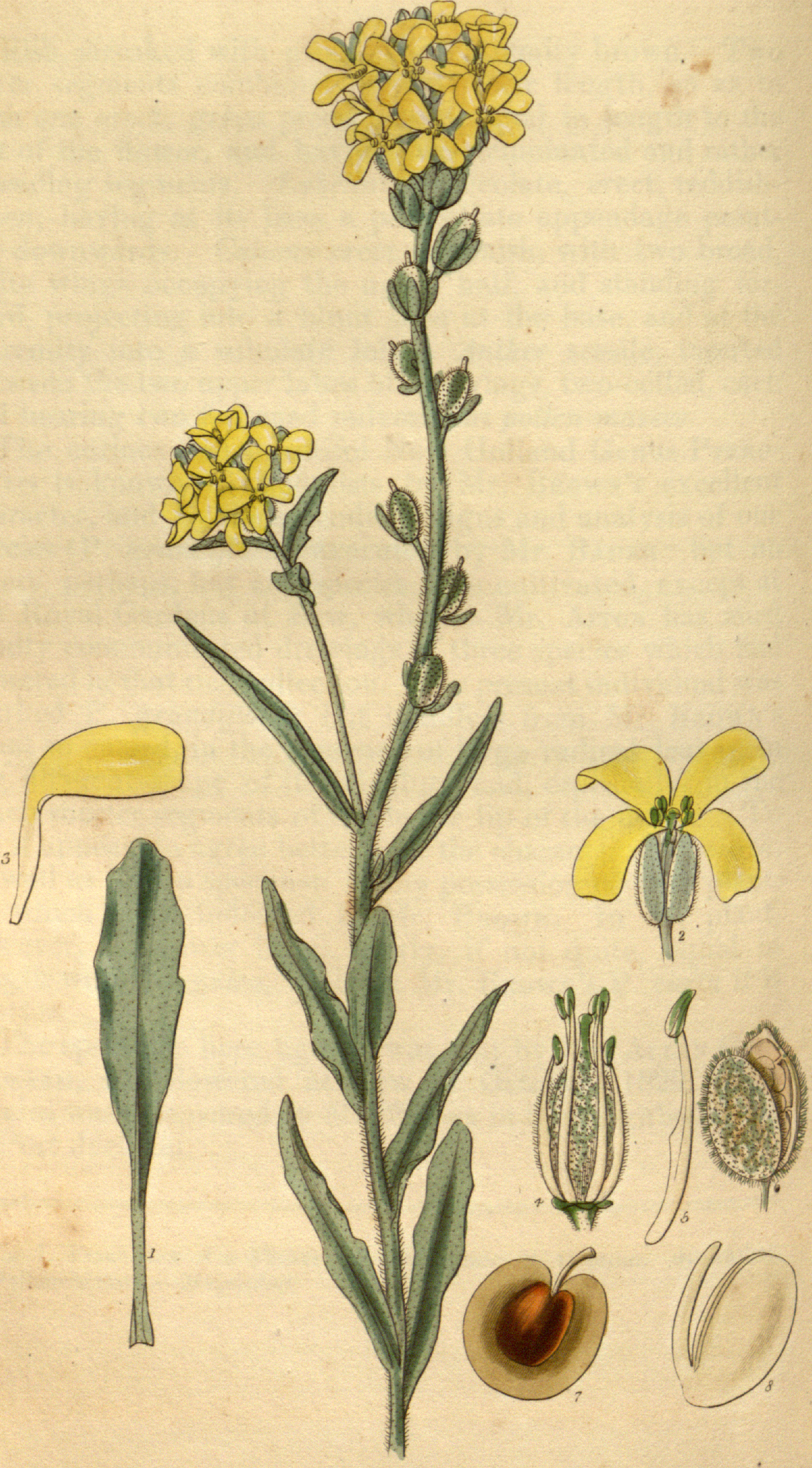

Scientific classification
- Kingdom: Plantae
- Clade: Tracheophytes
- Clade: Angiosperms
- Clade: Eudicots
- Clade: Rosids
- Clade: Malvids
- Order: Brassicales
- Family: Brassicaceae
- Tribe: Alysseae
- Genus: Acuston; Raf
- Species: A. perenne

Binomial name
- Acuston perenne (Mill.) Mabb. & Al-Shehbaz

Synonyms
- List: Acuston lunaroides (Willd.) Raf.; Alyssum lunarioides Willd.; Farsetia lunarioides (Willd.) W.T.Aiton; Fibigia lunarioides (Willd.) Sweet; Lunaria graeca Willd.; Lunaria perennis Mill.; Lunaria tournefortii Sibth. ex DC.; Pevalekia lunarioides (Willd.) Trinajstic

= Acuston =

Genus of flowering plants

Acuston is a monospecific genus in the family Brassicaceae which is found in Greece, Lebanon, and Syria. Acuston perenne has one accepted infraspecific, the subspecies obovatum which is found only in certain parts of Lebanon and Syria.
