= Parryodes =

Scientific classification
- Kingdom: Plantae
- Clade: Tracheophytes
- Clade: Angiosperms
- Clade: Eudicots
- Clade: Rosids
- Order: Brassicales
- Family: Brassicaceae
- Tribe: Arabideae
- Genus: Parryodes; Jafri

Species
- Parryodes axilliflora Jafri; Parryodes calcarea (Dudkin) D.A.German & Lysak

Genus of flowering plants

Parryodes is a genus of flowering plants in the family Brassicaceae. It includes two species of perennials native to Asia, one to the eastern Himalayas and the other to the Russian Far East.

- Parryodes axilliflora Jafri – Bhutan and southern Tibet
- Parryodes calcarea (Dudkin) D.A.German & Lysak – Russian Far East (Primorye)
