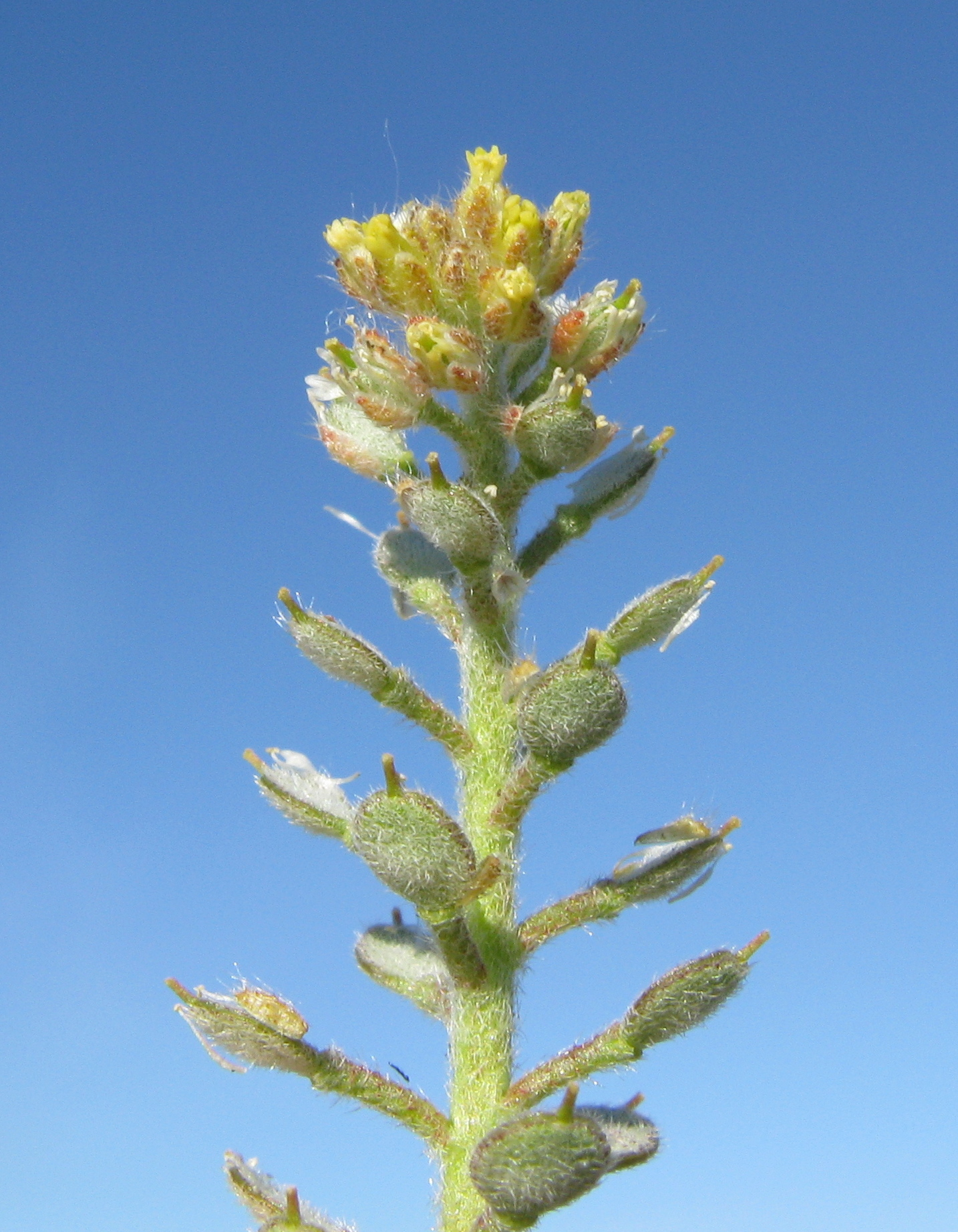
- Meniocus linifolius

Scientific classification
- Kingdom: Plantae
- Clade: Embryophytes
- Clade: Tracheophytes
- Clade: Spermatophytes
- Clade: Angiosperms
- Clade: Eudicots
- Clade: Rosids
- Order: Brassicales
- Family: Brassicaceae
- Genus: Meniocus; Desv.

= Meniocus =

Genus of plants

Meniocus is a genus of flowering plants belonging to the family Brassicaceae.

Its native range is Western Mediterranean, Southeastern and Eastern Europe to Mongolia and Arabian Peninsula.

== Species ==
Species:

- Meniocus aureus Fenzl
- Meniocus blepharocarpus (T.R.Dudley & Hub.-Mor.) Hadač & Chrtek
- Meniocus heterotrichus (Boiss.) Hadač & Chrtek
- Meniocus hirsutus Boiss. & A.Huet
- Meniocus linifolius (Stephan ex Willd.) DC.
- Meniocus meniocoides (Boiss.) Hadač & Chrtek
- Meniocus stylaris Boiss. & Balansa
