= Onuris (plant) =

Scientific classification
- Kingdom: Plantae
- Clade: Tracheophytes
- Clade: Angiosperms
- Clade: Eudicots
- Clade: Rosids
- Order: Brassicales
- Family: Brassicaceae
- Tribe: Eudemeae
- Genus: Onuris; Phil.

Species
- 5; see text

Genus of flowering plants

Onuris is a genus of flowering plants in the family Brassicaceae. It includes five species native to southern Argentina and southern Chile.

== Species ==
Five species are accepted.

- Onuris alismatifolia Gilg
- Onuris graminifolia Phil.
- Onuris hatcheriana (Gilg) Gilg & Muschl.
- Onuris papillosa O.E.Schulz
- Onuris spegazziniana Gilg & Muschl.
