= Rudolf-kamelinia =

Scientific classification
- Kingdom: Plantae
- Clade: Tracheophytes
- Clade: Angiosperms
- Clade: Eudicots
- Clade: Rosids
- Order: Brassicales
- Family: Brassicaceae
- Tribe: Euclidieae
- Genus: Rudolf-kamelinia; Al-Shehbaz & D.A.German
- Species: R. korolkowii

Binomial name
- Rudolf-kamelinia korolkowii (Regel & Schmalh.) Al-Shehbaz & D.A.German

Synonyms
- Dichasianthus korolkowii (Regel & Schmalh.) Soják; Malcolmia mongolica Maxim.; Neotorularia korolkowii (Regel & Schmalh.) Hedge & J.Léonard; Neotorularia sulphurea (Korsh.) Ikonn.; Sisymbrium korolkowii Regel & Schmalh. (1877) (basionym); Sisymbrium mongolicum (Maxim.) Maxim.; Sisymbrium sulphureum Korsh.; Torularia korolkowii (Regel & Schmalh.) O.E.Schulz; Torularia korolkowii var. longicarpa C.H.An; Torularia korolkowii var. longistyla Vassilcz.; Torularia rosulifolia K.C.Kuan & C.H.An; Torularia sulphurea (Korsh.) O.E.Schulz

Genus of flowering plants

Rudolf-kamelinia is a genus of flowering plants in the family Brassicaceae. It includes a single species, Rudolf-kamelinia korolkowii, which is native to Afghanistan, Central Asia, the western Himalayas, Tibet, Xinjiang, Qinghai, Gansu, and Mongolia.

The species was first described as Sisymbrium korolkowii by Eduard August von Regel and Johannes Theodor Schmalhausen in 1877. In 2016 Ihsan Ali Al-Shehbaz and Dmitry A. German placed the species in the new monotypic genus Rudolf-kamelinia as Rudolf-kamelinia korolkowii.
