= Litwinowia =

Scientific classification
- Kingdom: Plantae
- Clade: Tracheophytes
- Clade: Angiosperms
- Clade: Eudicots
- Clade: Rosids
- Order: Brassicales
- Family: Brassicaceae
- Tribe: Chorisporeae
- Genus: Litwinowia; Woronow
- Species: L. tenuissima

Binomial name
- Litwinowia tenuissima (Pall.) Woronow ex Pavlov

Synonyms
- Bunias tatarica Willd.; Euclidium tataricum (Willd.) DC.; Euclidium tenuissimum (Pall.) B.Fedtsch.; Litwinowia tatarica (Willd.) Woronow; Myagrum tataricum Poir.; Soria tenuissima Kuntze; Vella tatarica Pall.; Vella tenuissima Pall. (1776) (basionym)

Genus of flowering plants

Litwinowia is a genus of flowering plants in the family Brassicaceae. It includes a single species, Litwinowia tenuissima, an annual which ranges from southern European Russia and the Caucasus through Central Asia and Iran to Mongolia, Xinjiang, Pakistan, and the western Himalayas.

The species was first described as Vella tenuissima by Peter Simon Pallas in 1776. Jurij Nikolaewitch Woronow described the genus Litwinowia in 1931, and in 1935 Nikolai Vasilievich Pavlov placed the species there as Litwinowia tenuissima.
