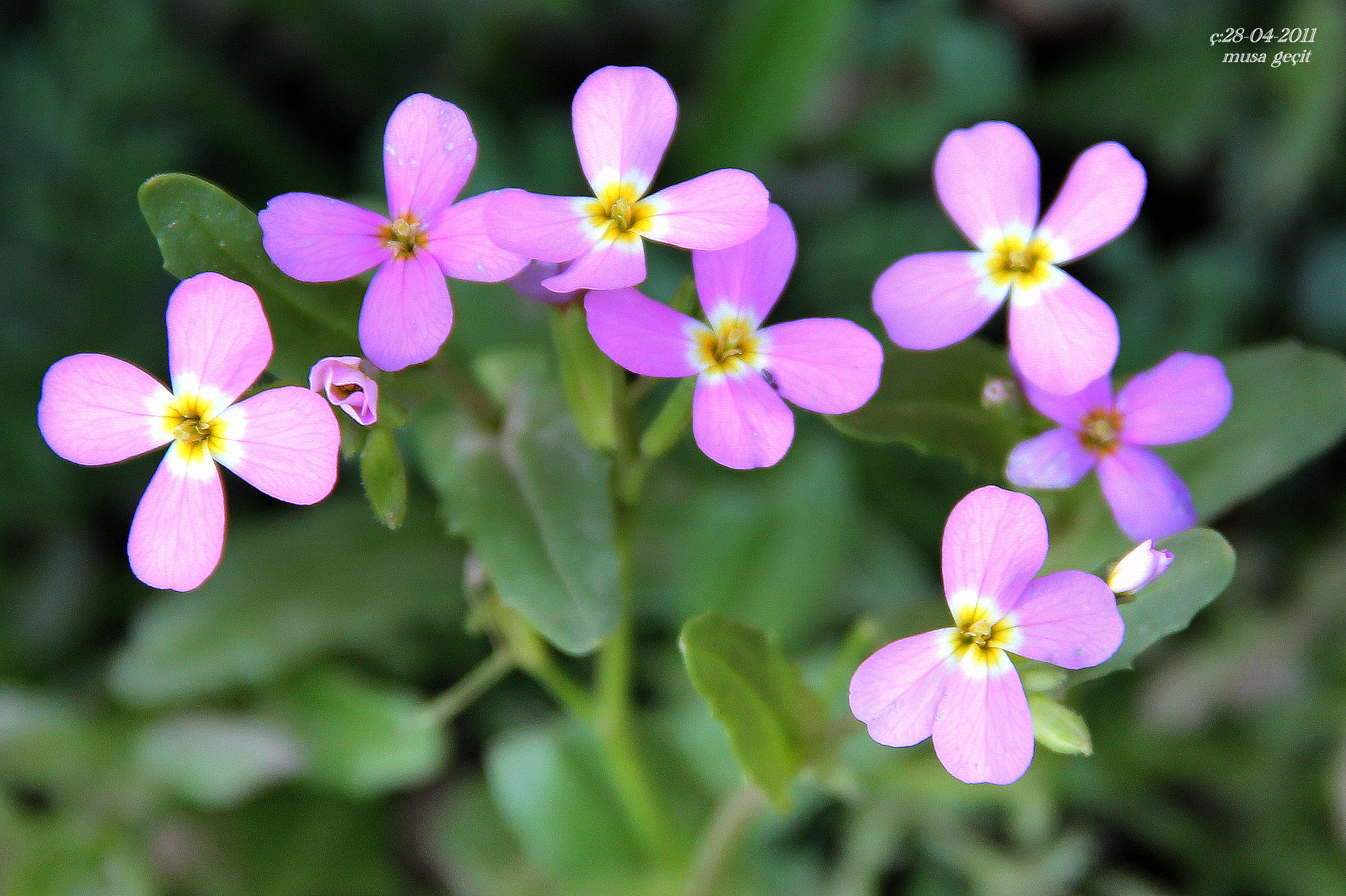
- Plagioloba crenulata

Scientific classification
- Kingdom: Plantae
- Clade: Tracheophytes
- Clade: Angiosperms
- Clade: Eudicots
- Clade: Rosids
- Order: Brassicales
- Family: Brassicaceae
- Tribe: Plagiolobeae; Khosravi & Eslami-Farouji
- Genus: Plagioloba (C.A.Mey.) Rchb.

Synonyms
- Zuvanda (Dvořák) Askerova

= Plagioloba =

Genus of flowering plants

Plagioloba is a genus of flowering plants belonging to the family Brassicaceae. It includes five species native to west and central Asia, ranging from Turkey and the Sinai Peninsula to Pakistan and Kazakhstan.

Plagioloba is the sole genus in tribe Plagiolobeae.

== Species ==
Five species are accepted.

- Plagioloba crenulata (DC.) D.A.German
- Plagioloba derakii Khosravi & Eslami-Farouji
- Plagioloba meyeri (Boiss.) D.A.German
- Plagioloba perfoliata (C.A.Mey.) D.A.German & Al-Shehbaz
- Plagioloba persica (Boiss.) Khosravi & Eslami-Farouji
