= Hemilophia =

Scientific classification
- Kingdom: Plantae
- Clade: Tracheophytes
- Clade: Angiosperms
- Clade: Eudicots
- Clade: Rosids
- Order: Brassicales
- Family: Brassicaceae
- Genus: Hemilophia; Franch.

Genus of plants

Hemilophia is a genus of flowering plants belonging to the family Brassicaceae. It includes six species native to south-central China.

== Species ==
Six species are accepted.

- Hemilophia cardiocarpa Huan C.Wang, Shao Y.Liu & Z.T.Ren
- Hemilophia franchetii Al-Shehbaz
- Hemilophia pulchella Franch.
- Hemilophia rockii O.E.Schulz
- Hemilophia serpens (O.E.Schulz) Al-Shehbaz
- Hemilophia sessilifolia Al-Shehbaz, Kats.Arai & H.Ohba
