= List of Arabis species =

List of plant species in the genus Arabis. The genus contains nearly 100 accepted species, spread across North America, Europe, temperate Asia, North Africa, and the mountains of central Africa. Many species previously included in Arabis have since been moved to other genera such as Altriarabis, Arabidopsis, Boechera, and Scapiarabis.

== Key ==
Name	The binomial name of the Arabis species. A binomial authority in parentheses indicates that the species was originally described in a different genus. A suggested English common name, if present, is listed inside parentheses.
Author	The author citation—the person who first described the species using an available scientific name, eventually combined with the one who placed it in Arabis, and using standardized abbreviations.
Year	The year in which the species was named, or transferred to the genus Arabis.
Distribution	The distribution of the species.

== Species ==
99 species are accepted.

Species name	Author	Year	Distribution	Image
Arabis aculeolata Waldo rockcress	Greene	1910	southern Oregon	
Arabis adpressipilis	(M.Hopkins) Al-Shehbaz	2017	southeastern Canada and northern and central United States	
Arabis alanyensis	H.Duman	2001	Turkey	
Arabis allionii	DC.	1805	southern European mountains, Ukraine and Crimea, and southern Turkey	
Arabis alpina Alpine rockcress	L.	1753	northern and central Europe to western Siberia, Greenland and northeastern Canada, Turkey and Syria, mountains of eastern Africa	
Arabis androsacea	Fenzl	1842	Turkey (Konya and Nigde)	
Arabis armena Armenian rockcress	N.Busch		Armenia	
Arabis aubrietioides	Boiss.	1867	Turkey	
Arabis aucheri	Boiss.	1842	Turkey, Levant, Iraq, and north-central Iran	
Arabis auriculata	Lam.	1783	Europe, North Africa, and western and Central Asia to the western Himalayas and Xinjiang	
Arabis beirana	P.Silveira, J.Paiva & N.Marcos Samaniego	2001	Central Portugal	
Arabis bellidifolia	Crantz	1762	Alps	
Arabis bijuga	Watt	1881	northern Pakistan and western Himalayas and south-central China	
Arabis blepharophylla Coast rockcress	Hook. & Arn.	1838	California	
Arabis brachycarpa	Rupr.	1869	northeastern Turkey and Transcaucasus	
Arabis bryoides	Boiss.	1842	Albania, Greece, and former Yugoslavia	
Arabis caerulea	All.	1773	Alps	
Arabis carduchorum	Boiss.	1867	eastern Turkey and northwestern Iran	
Arabis caucasica (Previously Arabis alpina subsp. caucasica); Garden Arabis	Willd.	1814	northwestern Africa, southeastern Europe, western Asia, western Arabian Peninsula, and Caucasus	
Arabis ciliata	Clairv.	1811	Central European mountains and Pyrenees	
Arabis colchica	Kolak.	1953	western and west-central Transcaucasus	
Arabis collina Rosy cress	Ten.	1811	southern and south-central Europe	
Arabis cretica	Boiss. & Heldr.	1849	Crete	
Arabis crucisetosa Wetsoil rockcress	Constance & Rollins	1936	northwestern United States	
Arabis cypria	Holmboe	1914	Cyprus	
Arabis davisii	H.Duman & A.Duran	2001	Turkey	
Arabis deflexa	Boiss.	1867	Turkey	
Arabis doberanica	Parsa	1946	north-central Iran	
Arabis dolichothrix	(N.Busch) N.Busch	1939	Transcaucasus	
Arabis doumetii	Coss.	1882	Algeria	
Arabis drabiformis	Boiss.	1842	Turkey	
Arabis elgonensis	Al-Sehbaz	2007	Uganda and Kenya	
Arabis engleriana	Muschl.	1907	Egypt	
Arabis erecta	Y.Y.Kim & C.G.Jang	2016	Korea	
Arabis erikii	Mutlu	2004	Anatolia	
Arabis erubescens	Ball	1873	North Africa	
Arabis eschscholtziana Eschscholtz's hairy rockcress	Andrz. ex Ledeb.	1831	Alaska, western Canada, and Western United States	
Arabis farinacea	Rupr.	1869	Caucasus	
Arabis flagellosa	Miq.	1865	Southeastern China, Japan, and Ryukyu Islands	
Arabis flaviflora	Bunge	1858	Caucasus	
Arabis furcata Columbia Gorge rockcress	S.Watson	1882	Oregon and Washington	
Arabis gegamica	Mtshkvet.	1975	Transcaucasus	
Arabis georgiana Georgia rockcress	R.M.Harper	1903	southeastern United States	
Arabis hirsuta Hairy rockcress	(L.) Scop.	1771	temperate Eurasia and northwestern Africa	
Arabis hornungiana	Schur	1866	Carpathians and northern Balkan Peninsula	
Arabis huetii	Trautv.	1873	Caucasus	
Arabis ionocalyx	Boiss. & Heldr.	1849	southern Turkey, western Syria, and Turkmenistan	
Arabis juressi	Rothm.	1940	northern Portugal (Serra do Gerês)	
Arabis kashmiriaca	Naqshi	1984	western Himalaya	
Arabis kaynakiae	Daşkın	2013	Turkey	
Arabis kazbegi Kazbegian rockcress	Mtzchvet.	1975	Georgia	
Arabis kennedyae Troodos rockcress	Meikle	1962	western Cyprus	
Arabis korolkowii	Regel & Schmalh.	1877	Turkmenistan	
Arabis lycia	Parolly & P.Hein	2000	Turkey	
Arabis margaritae	Talavera	1992	Spain	
Arabis mcdonaldiana McDonald's rockcress	Eastw.	1903	southern Oregon and northwestern California	
Arabis modesta Rogue Canyon rockcress	Rollins	1941	southern Oregon and northern California	
Arabis mollis	Steven	1812	eastern Turkey and northwestern Iran	
Arabis montbretiana	Boiss.	1842	Afghanistan, Iran, Syria, eastern Turkey, and Uzbekistan	
Arabis × murrii (A. ciliata × A. hirsuta)	Kehk ex Murr	1891	Austria	
Arabis nemorensis	(J.F.Wolff ex Hoffm.) W.D.J.Koch	1830	Europe and Caucasus	
Arabis nepetifolia	Boiss.	1867	northern Iran and southern Transcaucasus	
Arabis nordmanniana	(Rupr.) Rupr.	1869	Caucasus	
Arabis nova	Vill.	1779	European mountains and Morocco	
Arabis nuristanica	Kitam.	1958	eastern Afghanistan	
Arabis nuttallii Nuttall's rockcress	(Kuntze) B.L.Rob.	(1891) 1895	western Canada and northwestern and western United States	
Arabis olympica	Piper	1913	Washington	
Arabis oregana Oregon rockcress	Rollins	1941	southwestern Oregon and northern California	
Arabis ottonis-schulzii	Bornm. & Gauba	1935	central Iran	
Arabis × palezieuxii (A. alpina × A. hirsuta)	Beauverd	1913	France and Switzerland	
Arabis paniculata	Franch.	1889	western Himalayas to central China	
Arabis parvula	Dufour ex DC.	1821	northwestern Africa and central and southern Spain	
Arabis patens	Sull.	1819	east-central United States	
Arabis piluchiensis	S.S.Ying	2022	Taiwan	
Arabis planisiliqua	(Pers.) Rchb.	1837	southern and east-central Europe to western Siberia, the Caucasus, and Iran	
Arabis procurrens Spreading rockcress, Running rockcress	Waldst. & Kit.	1803	southeastern Europe	
Arabis pubescens	(Desf.) Poir.	1811	northwestern Africa	
Arabis purpurea	Sm.	1813	Cyprus (Troödos Mountains)	
Arabis pycnocarpa Creamflower rockcress, slender rockcress	M.Hopkins	1937	Canada and western, northern, and eastern United States	
Arabis quinqueloba	O.E.Schulz	1927	western Himalaya	
Arabis rosea	DC.	1821	Greece, Italy, and Sicily	
Arabis sagittata	(Bertol.) DC.	1815	southern, central, and eastern Europe, Algeria, Siberia, Western Asia, north-central china, and Russian Far East	
Arabis scabra Bristol rockcress	All.	1785	Europe	
Arabis scopoliana	Boiss.	1842	Albania and former Yugoslavia	
Arabis serpyllifolia	Vill.	1779	Pyrenees, Jura, Alps, Dinaric Mountains	
Arabis serrata	Franch. & Sav.	1875	China (Anhui), Japan, Korea, Sakhalin, Taiwan	
Arabis shengkuangshanensis	S.S.Ying	2022	Taiwan	
Arabis soyeri	Reut. & A.L.P.Huet	1853	European mountains	
Arabis stelleri	DC.	1821	Japan, Korea, and Russian Far East	
Arabis stellulata	Desv. & Berthel.	1813	Alps and central Italy	
Arabis stenocarpa	Boiss. & Reut.	1842	Iberian Peninsula	
Arabis subdecumbens	Emb. & Maire	1931	Morocco	
Arabis subflava	B.M.G.Jones	1964	southern Greece	
Arabis sudetica	Tausch	1836	east-central and southeastern Europe and Turkey	
Arabis taihumilis	S.S.Ying	1903	Taiwan	
Arabis tanakana	Makino	1903	Japan (Honshu: Mt. Shirane and Mt. Shirouma)	
Arabis tianschanica	Pavlov	1954	Tajikistan	
Arabis tunetana	Murb.	1905	Tunisia	
Arabis verdieri	Quézel	1972	Morocco	
Arabis verna	(L.) W.T.Aiton	1812	Mediterranean shore	
Arabis watsonii	(P.H.Davis) F.K.Mey.	2006	southeastern Turkey	

=== Artificial hybrid and unplaced species ===
Species name	Parent species	Author	Year	Distribution	Image
Arabis × arendsii artificial hybrid	A. caucasica x A. aubrietioides	H.R.Wehrh.	1931	North Europe & United States	
Arabis × digenea unplaced	A. procurrens x A. scopoliana	Fritsch	1895	Sweden	
Arabis × kellereri unplaced	A. bryoides x A. ferdinandi-coburgii	Sund.	1925	United States	

=== Formerly placed here ===
- Altriarabis amplexicaulis (Edgew.) Y.Z.Zhao (as Arabis amplexicaulis Edgew.)
- Altriarabis pterosperma (Edgew.) Y.Z.Zhao (as Arabis pterosperma Edgew.)
- Arabidopsis halleri (L.) O'Kane & Al-Shehbaz (as Arabis halleri L.)
- Arabidopsis lyrata (L.) O'Kane & Al-Shehbaz (as Arabis lyrata L.)
- Barbamine sachokiana (N.Busch) A.P.Khokhr. (as Arabis sachokiana (N.Busch) N.Busch)
- Catolobus pendulus (L.) Al-Shehbaz (as Arabis pendulus L.)
- Crucihimalaya rupicola (Krylov) A.L.Ebel & D.A.German (as Arabis rupicola Krylov)
- Crucihimalaya tenuisiliqua (Rech.f. & Köie) Al-Shehbaz, D.A.German & M.Koch (as Arabis tenuisiliqua Rech.f. & Koie)
- Crucihimalaya tibetica (Hook.f. & Thomson) Al-Shehbaz, D.A.German & M.Koch (as Arabis tibetica Hook.f. & Thomson)
- Draba rimarum (Rech.f.) Khosravi & Eslami-Farouji (as Arabis rimarum Rech.f.)
- Hurkaea conringioides (Ball) Al-Shehbaz, M.Koch, R.Karl & D.A.German (as Arabis conringioides Ball)
- Hurkaea josiae (Jahand. & Maire) Al-Shehbaz, M.Koch, R.Karl & D.A.German (as Arabis josiae Jahand. & Maire)
- Olimarabidopsis pumila (Stephan) Al-Shehbaz, O'Kane & R.A.Price (as Arabis foliosa Royle ex Hook.f. & Thomson)
- Parryodes axilliflora Jafri (as Arabis axilliflora (Jafri) H.Hara)
- Scapiarabis ariana (Hedge) M.Koch, R.Karl, D.A.German & Al-Shehbaz (as Arabis ariana Hedge)
- Scapiarabis karategina (Lipsky) M.Koch, R.Karl, D.A.German & Al-Shehbaz (as Arabis karategina Lipsky)
- Scapiarabis popovii (Botsch. & Vved.) M.Koch, R.Karl, D.A.German & Al-Shehbaz (as Arabis popovii Botsch. & Vved.)
- Scapiarabis saxicola (Edgew.) M.Koch, R.Karl, D.A.German & Al-Shehbaz (as Arabis saxicola Edgew.)
- Sinoarabis setosifolia (Al-Shehbaz) R.Karl, D.A.German, M.Koch & Al-Shehbaz (as Arabis setosifolia Al-Shehbaz)
- Turritis glabra L. (as Arabis glabra (L.) Bernh.)

== See also ==
- Lists of plant species
