= Acirostrum =

Scientific classification
- Kingdom: Plantae
- Clade: Tracheophytes
- Clade: Angiosperms
- Clade: Eudicots
- Clade: Rosids
- Order: Brassicales
- Family: Brassicaceae
- Genus: Acirostrum; Y.Z.Zhao
- Species: A. alaschanicum

Binomial name
- Acirostrum alaschanicum (Maxim.) Y.Z.Zhao

Synonyms
- Genus synonymy: Borodiniopsis D.A.German, M.Koch, R.Karl & Al-Shehbaz; Species synonymy: Arabis alaschanica Maxim.; Borodiniopsis alaschanica (Maxim.) D.A.German, M.Koch, R.Karl & Al-Shehbaz; Arabis holanshanica Y.Z.Lan & T.Y.Cheo

Genus of flowering plants

Acirostrum is a monotypic genus of flowering plants that consists solely of the species Acirostrum alaschanicum. The plant is found in Inner Mongolia, Qinghai, and the central regions of China.

== Description ==
Acirostrum alaschanicum is a small perennial plant with a long, spindle-shaped root. The leaves are an obtuse shape with a pointed end, and are carried on winged leafstalks. The leaf blades are covered in simple hairs. The flowers are borne on a cluster called a raceme that is elongated in shape. Each flower has erect sepals that do not exceed the length of the petals.

== Taxonomy ==
The plant was first described as Arabis alaschanicum in 1880 by Karl Maximovich. Even in these early writings about it, there was uncertainty as to its placement in Arabis. However, it could not be placed into other related genera like Cardamine because of its unique morphology. Acirostrum was established in 2012, and the superfluous name Borodiniopsis is considered a synonym of the genus. The genus was split from the polyphyletic taxon Arabis, and it is most closely related to Botschantzevia, another small genus in Brassicaceae.
