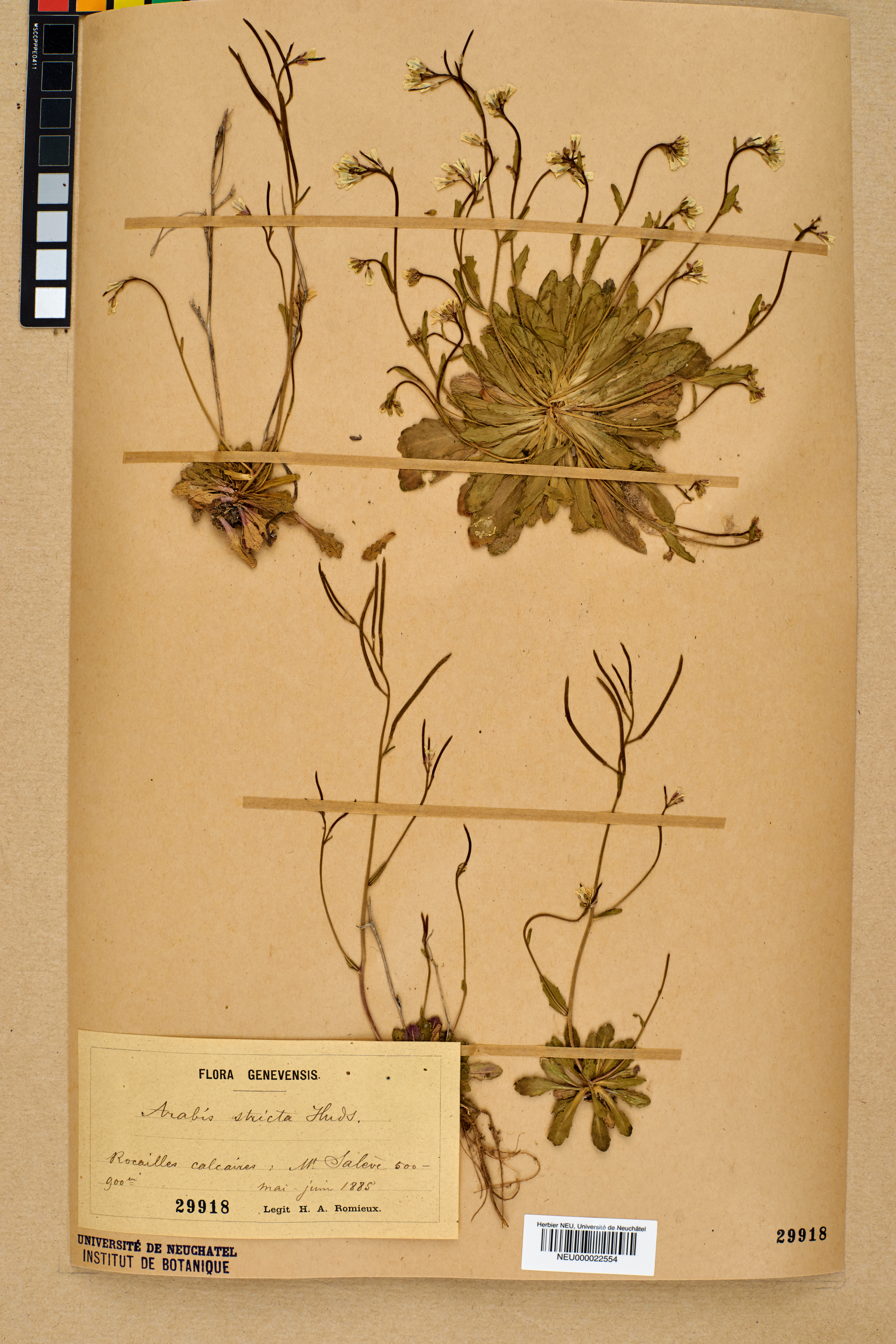
- Dried pressed specimen of Arabis scabra in the Neuchâtel Herbarium

Scientific classification
- Kingdom: Plantae
- Clade: Tracheophytes
- Clade: Angiosperms
- Clade: Eudicots
- Clade: Rosids
- Order: Brassicales
- Family: Brassicaceae
- Genus: Arabis
- Species: A. scabra

Binomial name
- Arabis scabra All.

Synonyms
- List: Arabis biennis Timb.-Lagr.; Arabis corbariensis Timb.-Lagr.; Arabis hirta Lam.; Arabis hispida Aiton; Arabis montana Bernh. ex DC.; Arabis stricta Huds.; Erysimum strictum (Huds.) Kuntze; Turrita stricta Bubani; Turritis raii Vill.; Turritis stricta Fourr.

= Arabis scabra =

Species of flowering plant

Arabis scabra, the Bristol rockcress, is a perennial flowering plant in the family Brassicaceae with a disjunct native range in France, Spain and Switzerland and a single outpost in the Avon Gorge, England.

== Distribution and habitat ==
Arabis scabra is primarily a montane Mediterranean species, occurring on warm, limestone slopes of the Pyrenees in France and Spain, the mountains of northern and north-eastern Iberia, south-eastern France and the south-western Alps. It grows in very shallow, lime-rich soils—on scree, rocky ledges and open woodland edges where taller competitors are scarce. In England it is native only to the Avon Gorge near Bristol; isolated introductions elsewhere (for example at Combwich) have generally failed to persist.

== Phylogeography and genetic diversity ==
Although most populations lie in mainland Europe, genetic analyses using genome-wide AFLP markers and whole-chloroplast sequences identify the Iberian Peninsula as the primary centre of diversity: two major gene pools there diverged during the last glacial period and harbour most of the species' rare alleles. From these refugia A. scabra expanded northwards after the Last Glacial Maximum, most likely via open corridors across exposed limestone habitats. The Avon Gorge population appears to have been founded around 16,000 years ago by seed‐mediated dispersal over the then-dry Celtic Sea and has nonetheless retained a high proportion of the species' overall genetic variation.

Chloroplast data reveal four closely related haplotypes that diverged no earlier than 51'000 years ago; all British individuals share the same haplotype found in southern France and the western Alps, consistent with a late-Pleistocene sweep from Iberia through France to Britain. Limited isolation-by-distance within Spain and France further supports a history of post-glacial range expansion rather than long-term fragmentation.

== See also ==
- List of Arabis species
