= Arabis hirsuta var. sadina =

Conservation status
- Data Deficient (IUCN 3.1)

Scientific classification
- Kingdom: Plantae
- Clade: Tracheophytes
- Clade: Angiosperms
- Clade: Eudicots
- Clade: Rosids
- Order: Brassicales
- Family: Brassicaceae
- Genus: Arabis
- Species: A. hirsuta
- Variety: A. h. var. sadina

Trinomial name
- Arabis hirsuta var. sadina (Samp.) Govaerts

Synonyms
- Arabis muralis var. sadina Samp. (1911) (basionym); Arabis sadina (Samp.) Cout.

Species of flowering plant

Arabis hirsuta var. sadina is a variety of flowering plant in the family Brassicaceae. It is a perennial endemic to Portugal.

== Distribution and habitat ==
Arabis hirsuta var. sadina is endemic to the centre-west of Portugal, occurring in the districts of Leiria, Santarém, Lisbon, Setúbal and Évora. It lives in glades of forests and basophil scrub in coastal cliffs and hills close to the sea; on rocky outcrops or stony, limestone soils and open areas of oak stands (Quercus rotundifolia, Quercus suber, Quercus faginea). Main populations occur in Serras de Aire e Candeeiros, Serra de Montejunto and Serra da Arrábida.
