= Arabis armena =

Armenian rockcress

Conservation status
- Near Threatened (IUCN 3.1)

Scientific classification
- Kingdom: Plantae
- Clade: Tracheophytes
- Clade: Angiosperms
- Clade: Eudicots
- Clade: Rosids
- Order: Brassicales
- Family: Brassicaceae
- Genus: Arabis
- Species: A. armena

Binomial name
- Arabis armena N.Busch

Species of rockcress

Arabis armena, the Armenian rockcress, is a species of rockcress that is found in Armenia and Nakhichevan (Azerbaijan). It grows at mid- and high-elevations. It is threatened by the trampling of cattle.

== See also ==
- List of Arabis species
