= Altriarabis =

Scientific classification
- Kingdom: Plantae
- Clade: Tracheophytes
- Clade: Angiosperms
- Clade: Eudicots
- Clade: Rosids
- Order: Brassicales
- Family: Brassicaceae
- Genus: Altriarabis; Y.Z.Zhao

Species
- Altriarabis amplexicaulis (Edgew.) Y.Z.Zhao; Altriarabis pterosperma (Edgew.) Y.Z.Zhao

Genus of flowering plants

Altriarabis is a genus of flowering plants in the family Brassicaceae. It includes two species native to Asia, which range from Afghanistan through the Himalayas to Mongolia and south-central China.

- Altriarabis amplexicaulis (Edgew.) Y.Z.Zhao
- Altriarabis pterosperma (Edgew.) Y.Z.Zhao

The species were formerly placed in genus Arabis, and some authorities still treat Altriarabis as a synonym of Arabis.
