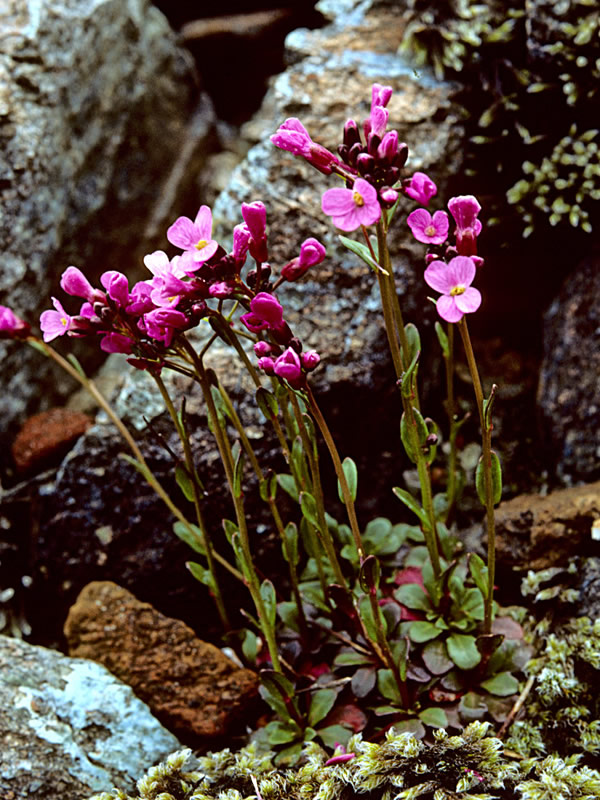

Conservation status
- Endangered (ESA)

Scientific classification
- Kingdom: Plantae
- Clade: Tracheophytes
- Clade: Angiosperms
- Clade: Eudicots
- Clade: Rosids
- Order: Brassicales
- Family: Brassicaceae
- Genus: Arabis
- Species: A. mcdonaldiana

Binomial name
- Arabis mcdonaldiana Eastw.

= Arabis mcdonaldiana =

Species of plant

Arabis mcdonaldiana is a species of flowering plant in the mustard family known by the common name McDonald's rockcress. It is native to northern California and Oregon, where it grows on newly exposed, barren serpentine soils in openings in temperate coniferous forest habitat. It is a rare and endangered plant known from several sites in California and approximately two occurrences in Oregon, where it is threatened mainly by mining, particularly of nickel, which is one of several metals plentiful in the serpentine. On September 29, 1978, this was the second plant to be federally listed as an endangered species.

== Description ==
This is a perennial herb growing one or more slender stems from a small, branching caudex, reaching 10 to 30 centimeters tall. There is a basal patch of leaves with edges lined in small, widely spaced teeth which are sometimes tipped with spines. The leaves may lack teeth and have wavy margins. There may also be a few smaller leaves along the stem. The top of the stem forms an inflorescence of a few flowers, each with four bright rose-purple petals. The fruit is a flat, straight silique about 3 centimeters long which contains several oblong little seeds.

== See also ==
- List of Arabis species
