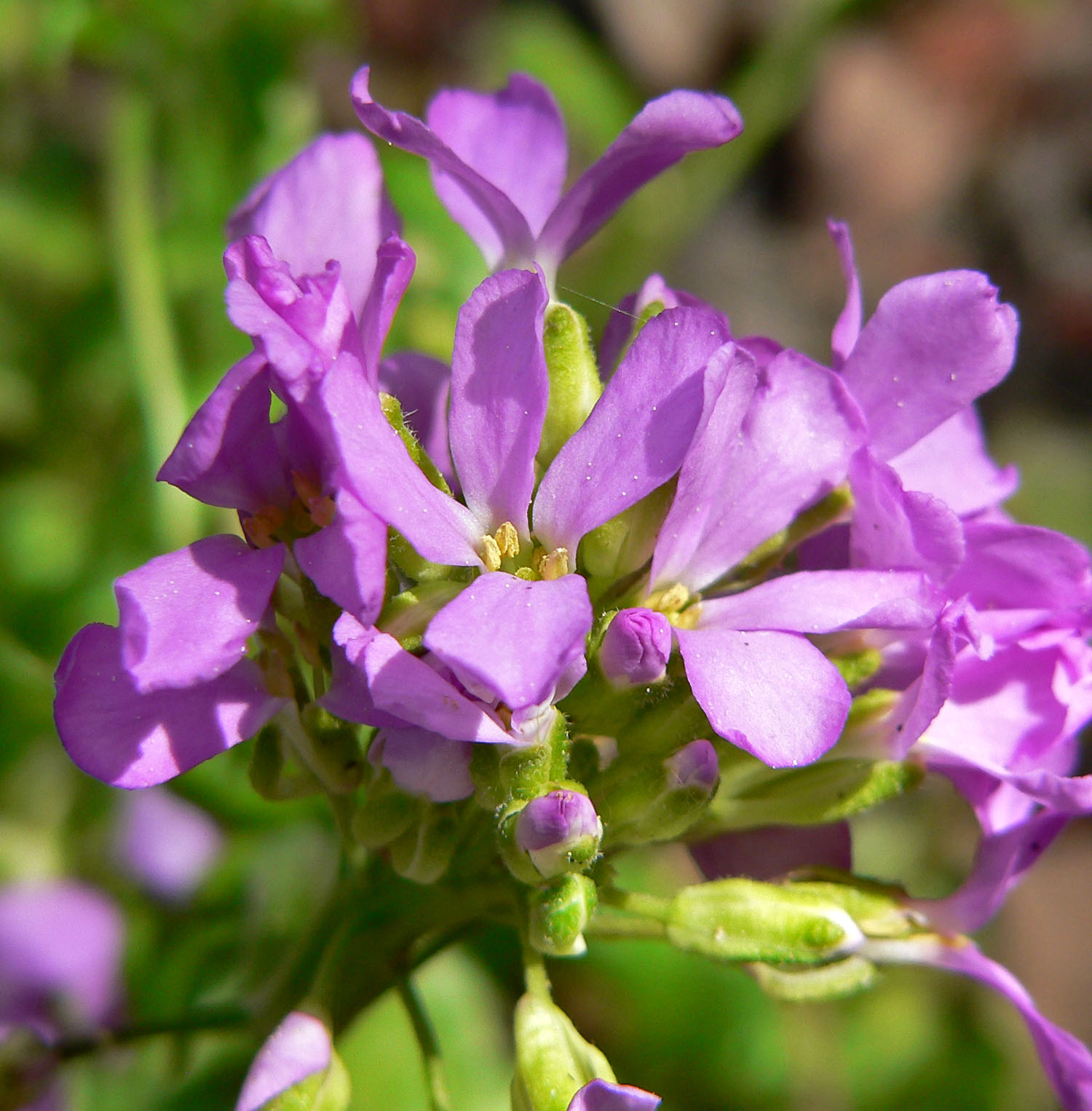

Conservation status
- Vulnerable (NatureServe)

Scientific classification
- Kingdom: Plantae
- Clade: Tracheophytes
- Clade: Angiosperms
- Clade: Eudicots
- Clade: Rosids
- Order: Brassicales
- Family: Brassicaceae
- Genus: Arabis
- Species: A. blepharophylla

Binomial name
- Arabis blepharophylla Hook. & Arn.

= Arabis blepharophylla =

Species of plant

Arabis blepharophylla is a species of flowering plant in the family Brassicaceae, known by the common names coast rock cress and rose rock cress. It is endemic to California, growing mostly in the San Francisco Bay Area and nearby low-elevation California Coast Ranges.

This herbaceous perennial that sends up thin, hairy stems from a basal rosette of fuzzy leaves. It bears small flowers with four bright purplish-pink petals.

Uncommon in the wild, it is often grown as an attractive, sweet-scented flowering garden plant. There are several cultivars bred for garden use. The cultivar 'Frühlingszauber' has received the Royal Horticultural Society's Award of Garden Merit.

== See also ==
- List of Arabis species
