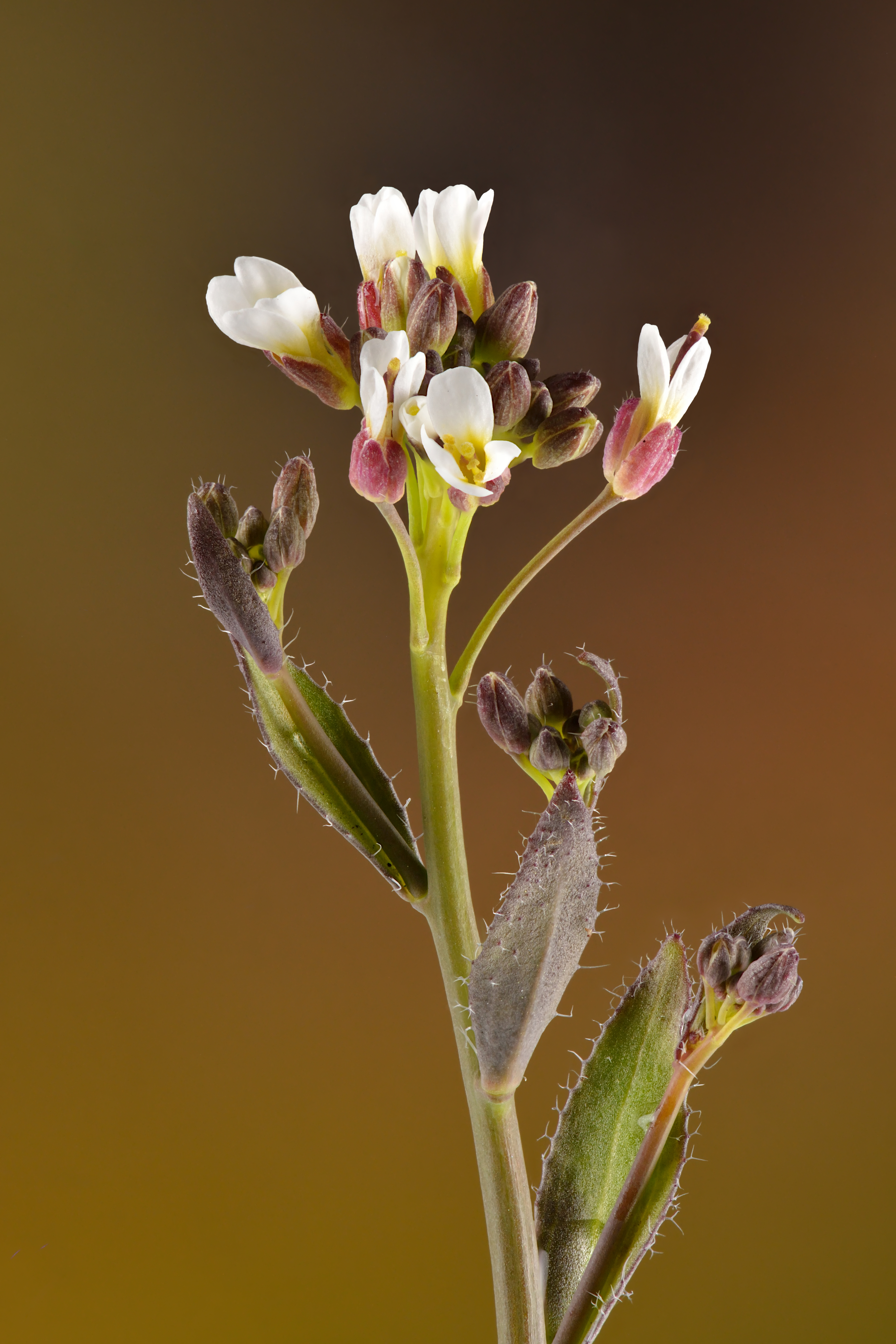

Scientific classification
- Kingdom: Plantae
- Clade: Tracheophytes
- Clade: Angiosperms
- Clade: Eudicots
- Clade: Rosids
- Order: Brassicales
- Family: Brassicaceae
- Genus: Arabis
- Species: A. hirsuta

Binomial name
- Arabis hirsuta (L.) Scop. 1772 not DC. 1805 nor Royle ex Hook. f. & Thomson 1861

Infraspecific taxa
- Arabis hirsuta subsp. balansae (Boiss. & Reut.) Maire; Arabis hirsuta subsp. hirsuta; Arabis hirsuta var. sadina (Samp.) Govaerts

Synonyms
- Synonymy: Turritis hirsuta L. 1753; Arabis accedens Jord.; Arabis brownii Jord.; Arabis collisparsa Jord.; Arabis conferta Willd. ex Rchb.; Arabis contracta Spenn.; Arabis curtisiliqua DC.; Arabis gracilescens Jord.; Arabis hirtella Jord.; Arabis idanensis Jord.; Arabis marschalliana Steud.; Arabis montana Lam.; Arabis nemoralis Steud.; Arabis nipponica (Franch. & Sav.) H.Boissieu; Arabis ovata (Pursh) Poir.; Arabis petricola Jord.; Arabis platystigma (Beck) Beck; Arabis propera Jord.; Arabis propinqua Jord.; Arabis reichenbachii Syme; Arabis retziana Beurl. ex Nyman; Arabis rupestris Nutt.; Crucifera contracta E.H.L.Krause; Erysimum hirsutum (L.) Kuntze; Turrita hirsuta (L.) Bubani; Turritis accedens Fourr.; Turritis collisparsa Fourr.; Turritis curtisiliqua Fr. ex DC.; Turritis gerardiana Ramond ex DC.; Turritis hirtella Fourr.; Turritis idanensis Fourr.; Turritis multiflora Lapeyr.; Turritis oblongata Raf.; Turritis propera Fourr.; Turritis raji J.Presl & C.Presl; Turritis stenopetala Willd.; Arabis eschscholtziana Andrz. ex Ledeb.; Arabis hornungiana Schur; Arabis pycnocarpa M.Hopkins; Arabis sadina (Samp.) Cout.

= Arabis hirsuta =

Species of plant

Arabis hirsuta, known as hairy rock-cress, is a flowering plant in the family Brassicaceae. In previous North American works, this species has been broadly defined to include plants native to Europe, Asia, and the northern half of North America, but is now more often restricted to a narrower subgroup restricted to Europe.

Arabis hirsuta grows to heights of up to around 75 centimetres (30 in) and is usually unbranched, with a long spike of flowers. Lower leaves form a rosette, the stalkless upper-leaves clasp the stem. The white petals are twice as long as the sepals, flowers June–August. The fruits are cylindrical and pressed close to the stem and the slightly winged seeds are reddish brown. It features hairs, which are stiff and forking. The species grows on chalk slopes, dunes, hedgebanks, walls and rocks.

The conservation status of Arabis hirsuta, in the UK, is marked as "least concern" as of 2021.

== Subdivisions ==
Three subdivisions are accepted.

- Arabis hirsuta subsp. balansae (Boiss. & Reut.) Maire (synonym Arabis balansae Boiss. & Reut.) – Algeria and Morocco
- Arabis hirsuta subsp. hirsuta – temperate Eurasia and Algeria
- Arabis hirsuta var. sadina (Samp.) Govaerts (synonym Arabis sadina (Samp.) Cout.) – central Portugal (Estremadura)

== Gallery ==
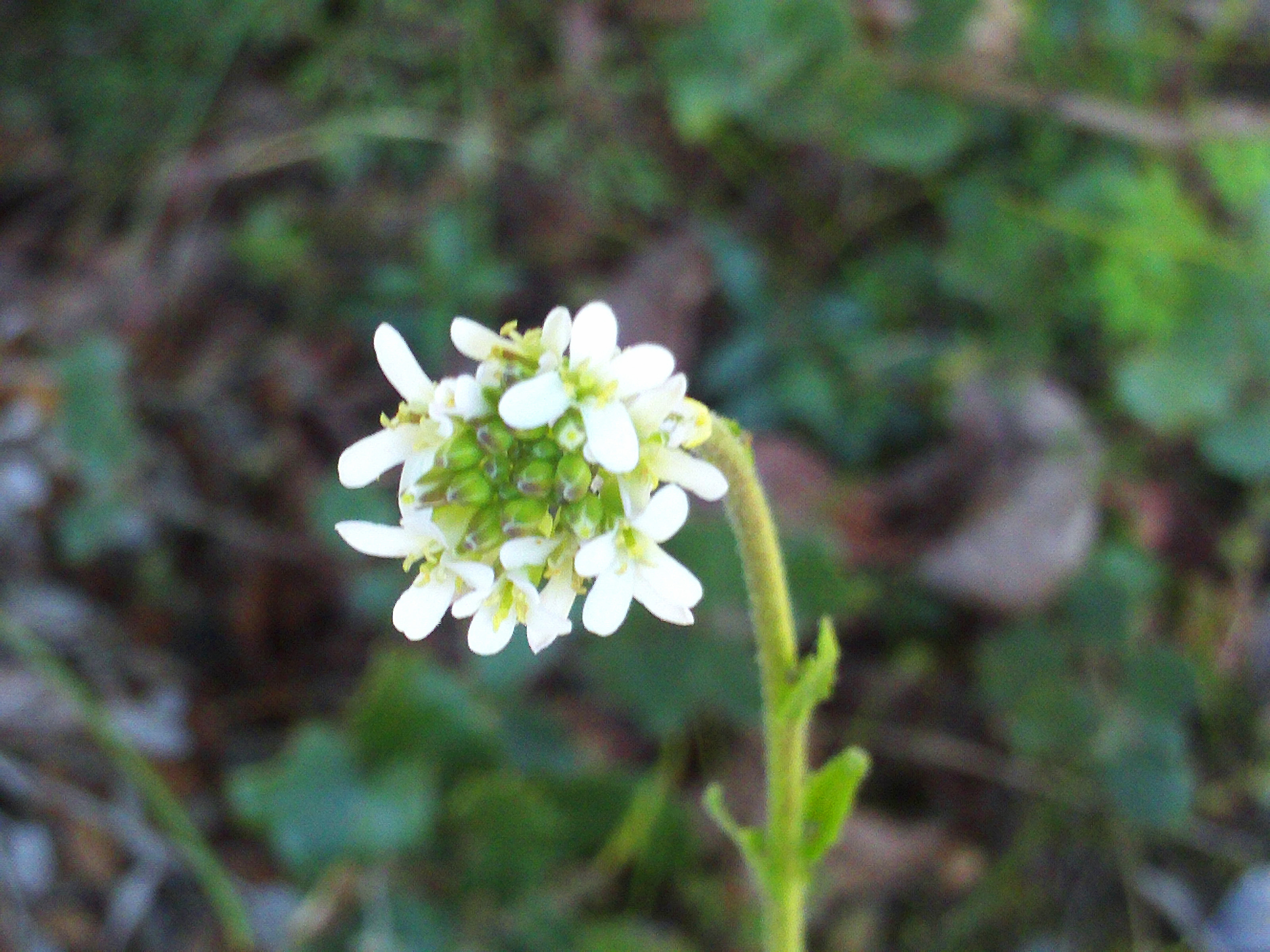

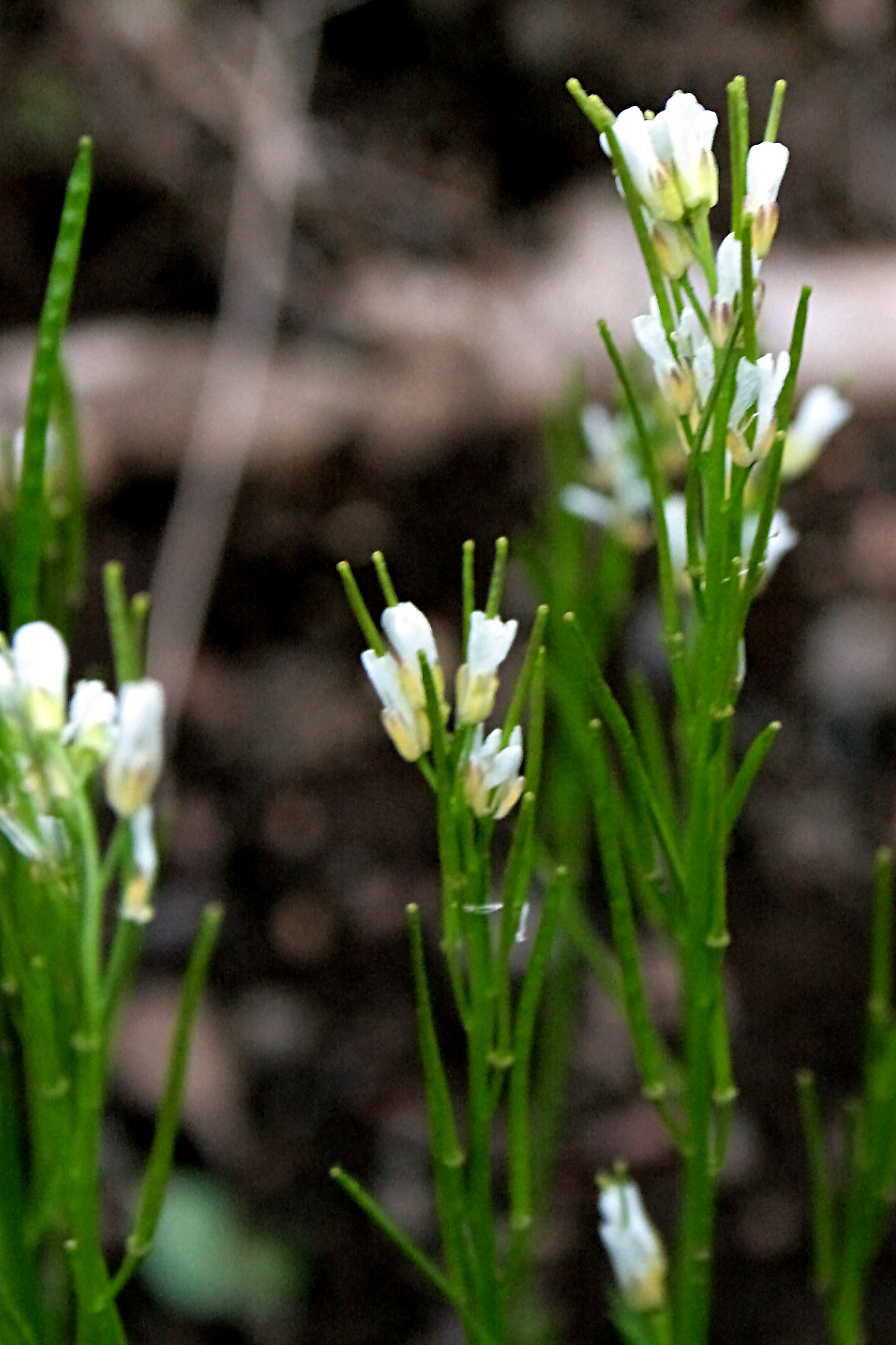

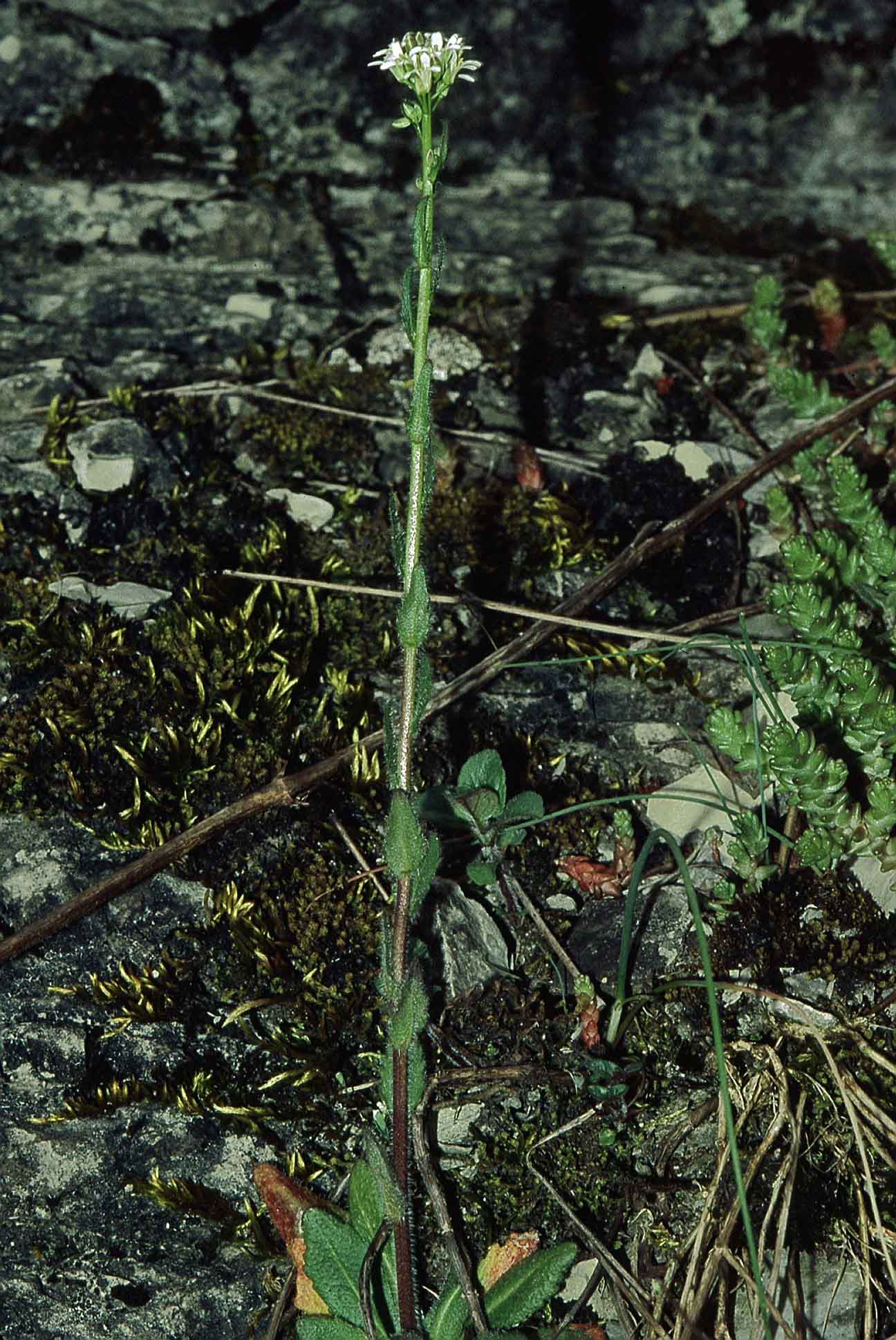

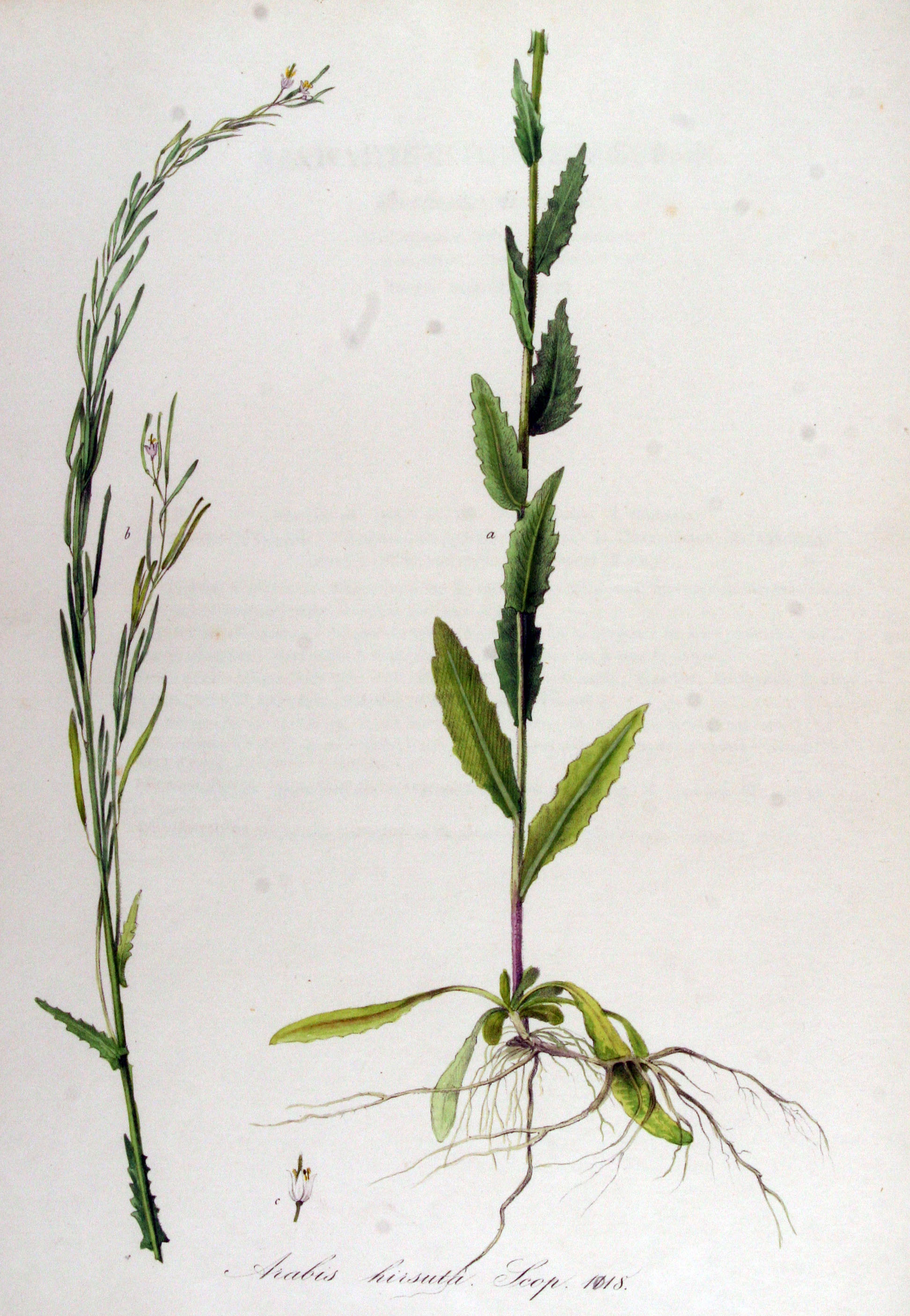

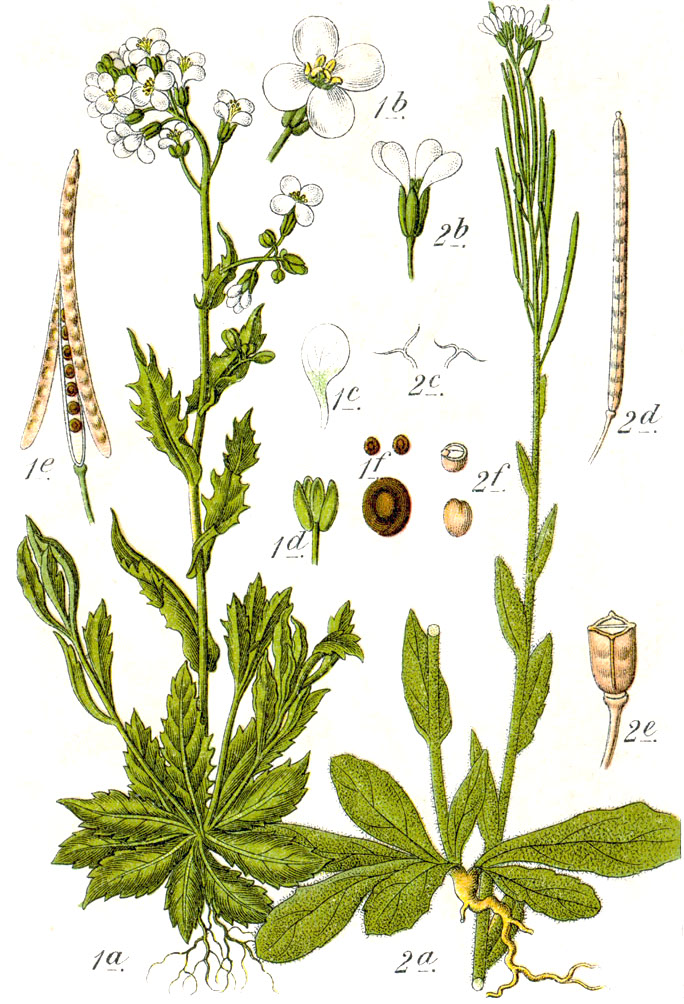
1796 illustration

== See also ==
- List of Arabis species
