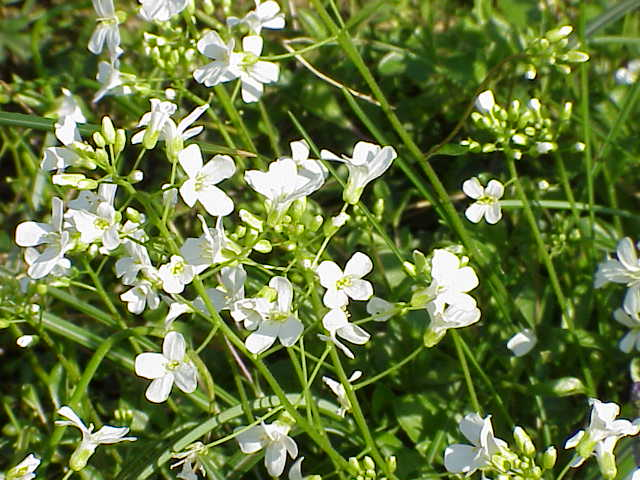

Scientific classification
- Kingdom: Plantae
- Clade: Tracheophytes
- Clade: Angiosperms
- Clade: Eudicots
- Clade: Rosids
- Order: Brassicales
- Family: Brassicaceae
- Genus: Arabis
- Species: A. procurrens

Binomial name
- Arabis procurrens Waldst. & Kit.

Varieties
- Arabis procurrens var. ferdinandi-coburgi (Kellerer & Sünd.) Govaerts; Arabis procurrens var. procurrens; Arabis procurrens var. vochinensis (Spreng.) Govaerts

Synonyms
- Erysimum procurrens (Waldst. & Kit.) Kuntze

= Arabis procurrens =

Species of plant

Arabis procurrens, the running rockcress or spreading rock cress, is a species of flowering plant in the family Brassicaceae. It is a spreading evergreen or semi-evergreen perennial, forming a dense mat of foliage, with loose racemes of white flowers in spring, suitable for cultivation in the alpine garden.

The specific epithet procurrens means "spreading underground".

This species is listed as invasive in Belgium, the Czech Republic and the United States of America.

== Varieties ==
Three varieties are accepted.

- Arabis procurrens var. ferdinandi-coburgi (Kellerer & Sünd.) Govaerts (synonym Arabis fernandi-coburgi Kellerer & Sünd.) – Bulgaria
- Arabis procurrens var. procurrens – Bulgaria, Greece, Romania, and former Yugoslavia
- Arabis procurrens var. vochinensis (Spreng.) Govaerts (synonyms Arabis vochinensis Spreng., A. arabiformis (Hohenw.) Soldano, A. flexuosa Rchb., Draba arabiformis Hohenw., D. mollis Scop., Erysimum molle (Scop.) Kuntze, and Subularia alpina Willd.) – southeastern Alps (Austria, Italy, and Slovenia)

The cultivar Arabis procurrens 'Variegata', with white-edged leaves, has gained the Royal Horticultural Society's Award of Garden Merit.

== See also ==
- List of Arabis species
