= Carlo Allioni =

Italian physician and professor of botany (1728–1804)

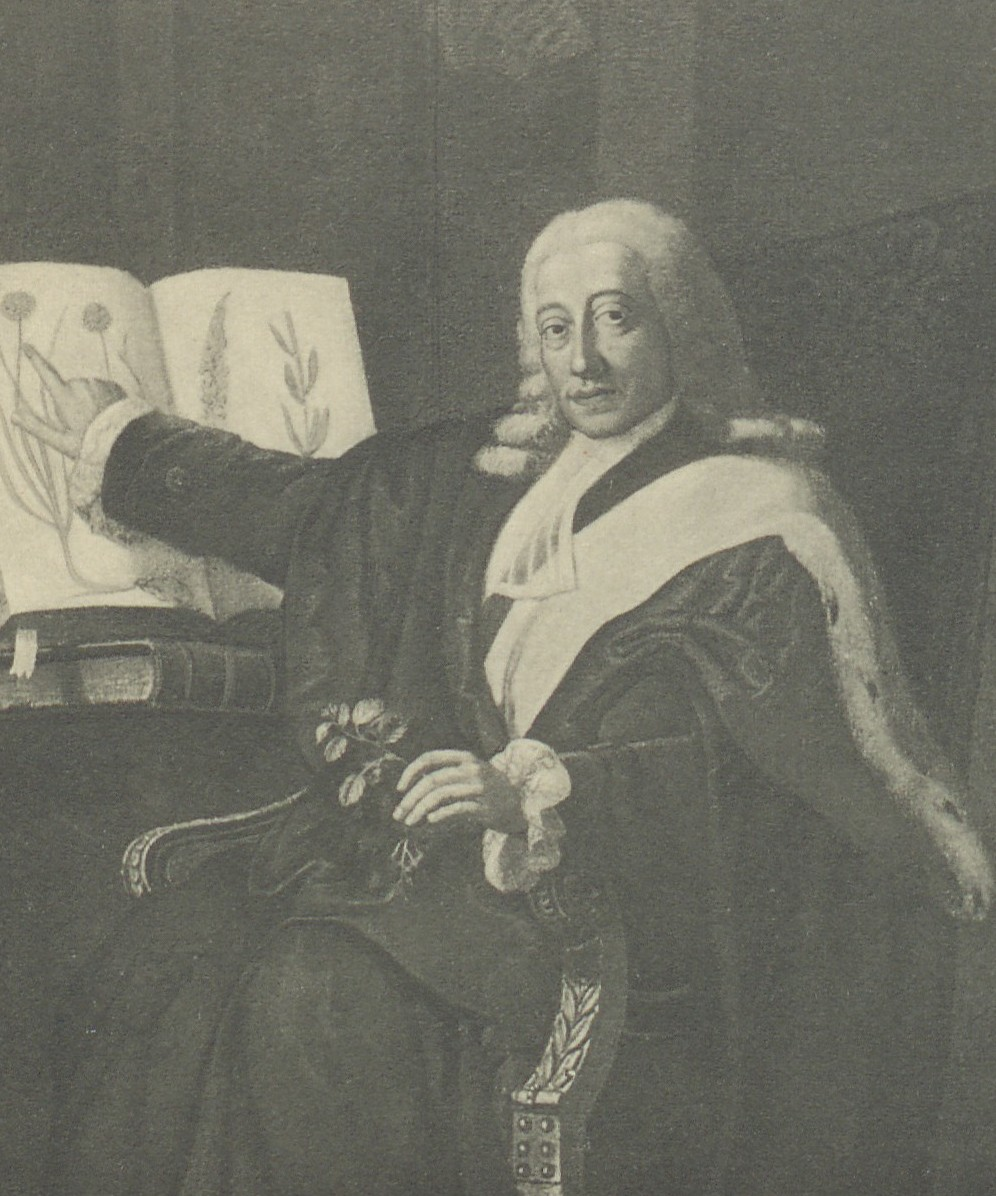
Carlo Allioni

Carlo Allioni (23 September 1728 in Turin – 30 July 1804 in Turin) was an Italian physician and professor of botany at the University of Turin. His most important work was Flora Pedemontana, sive enumeratio methodica stirpium indigenarum Pedemontii 1755, a study of the plant world in Piedmont, in which he listed 2813 species of plants, of which 237 were previously unknown. In 1766, he published the Manipulus Insectorum Tauriniensium.

== Biography ==
Carlo Ludovico Alloni, son of the Consultant Physician to the King Vittorio Amedeo II. He graduated in medicine at Turin in 1747 and was admitted to the College of Physicians; he initially dedicated himself to the practice, even obtaining the position of chief physician to the King Vittorio Amedeo III of Savoy. However his attention was soon captured by the natural sciences, in particular, the study of plant species. His name is remembered above all for his studies and work in the field of botany.

== Career ==
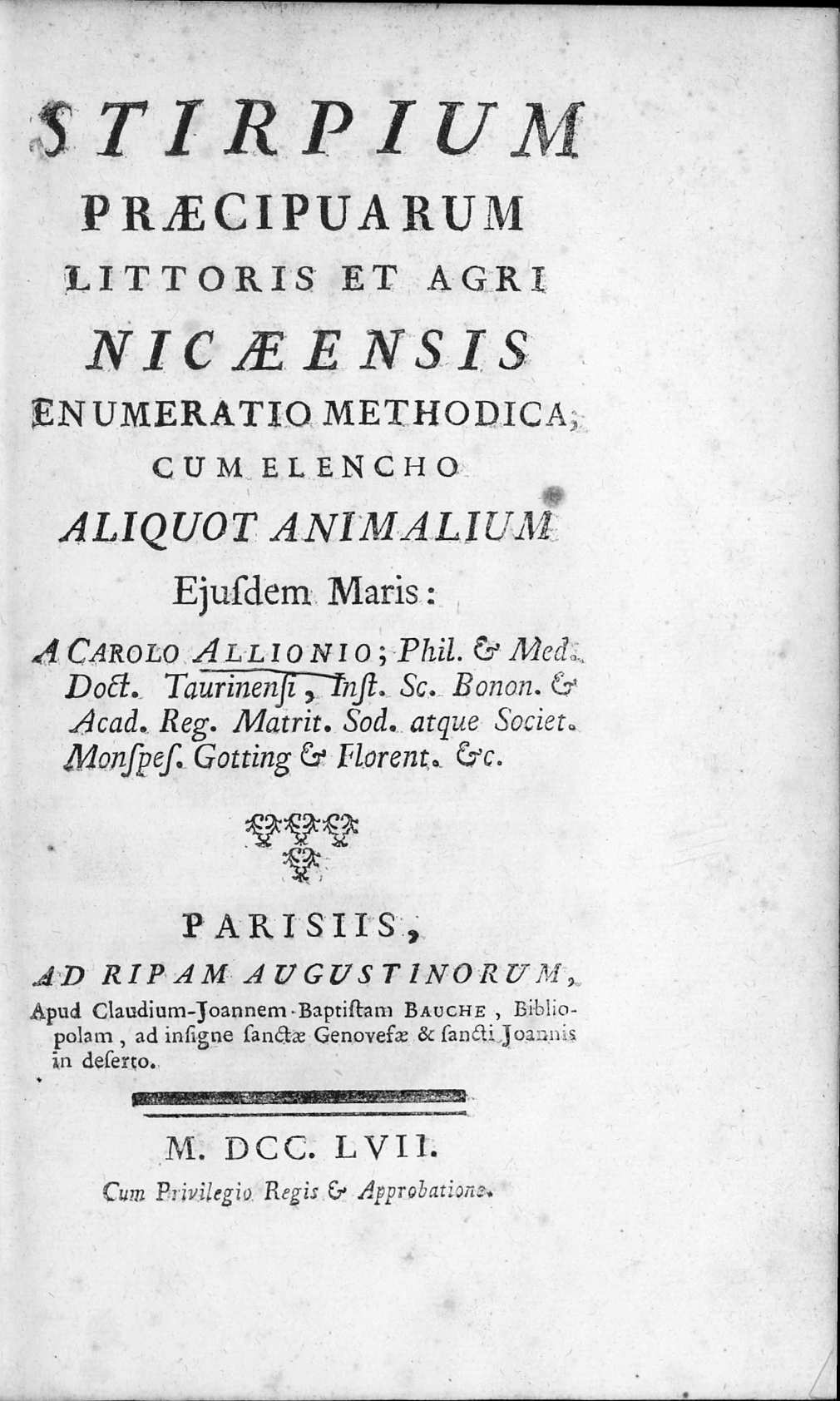
Stirpium praecipuarum littoris et agri Nicaeensis enumeratio methodica, 1757

In April, 1758 he was elected a Fellow of the Royal Society.

He was appointed extraordinary professor of botany at the University of Turin in 1760 and was also the director of the Turin Botanical Garden. The journal Allionia: bollettino dell' istituto ed orto botanico dell' università di Torino is named after him.

First Pehr Löfling and then Linnaeus named the New World herb genus Allionia (Nyctaginaceae) after Allioni. Per Axel Rydberg named the genus Allioniella (now a taxonomic synonym for Mirabilis), after him.

Also named after him are:

- Arabis allionii
- Jovibarba allioni
- Primula allioni
- Veronica allionii

== Selected works ==
- Flora Pedemontana, sive, Enumeratio methodica stirpium indigenarum Pedemontii, Turin, 1755.
- Stirpium praecipuarum litoris et agri Nicaensis, Turin, 1755.
  - Stirpium praecipuarum littoris et agri Nicaeensis enumeratio methodica (in Latin). Paris: Jean Baptiste Claude Bauche (2.). 1757.
- Auctarium ad floram Pedemontanam cum notis et emendationibus (1789)
- Stirpium praecipuarum littoris et agri Nicaeensis Enumeratio methodica cum Elencho aliquot anirnalium ejusdem maris (1757)
