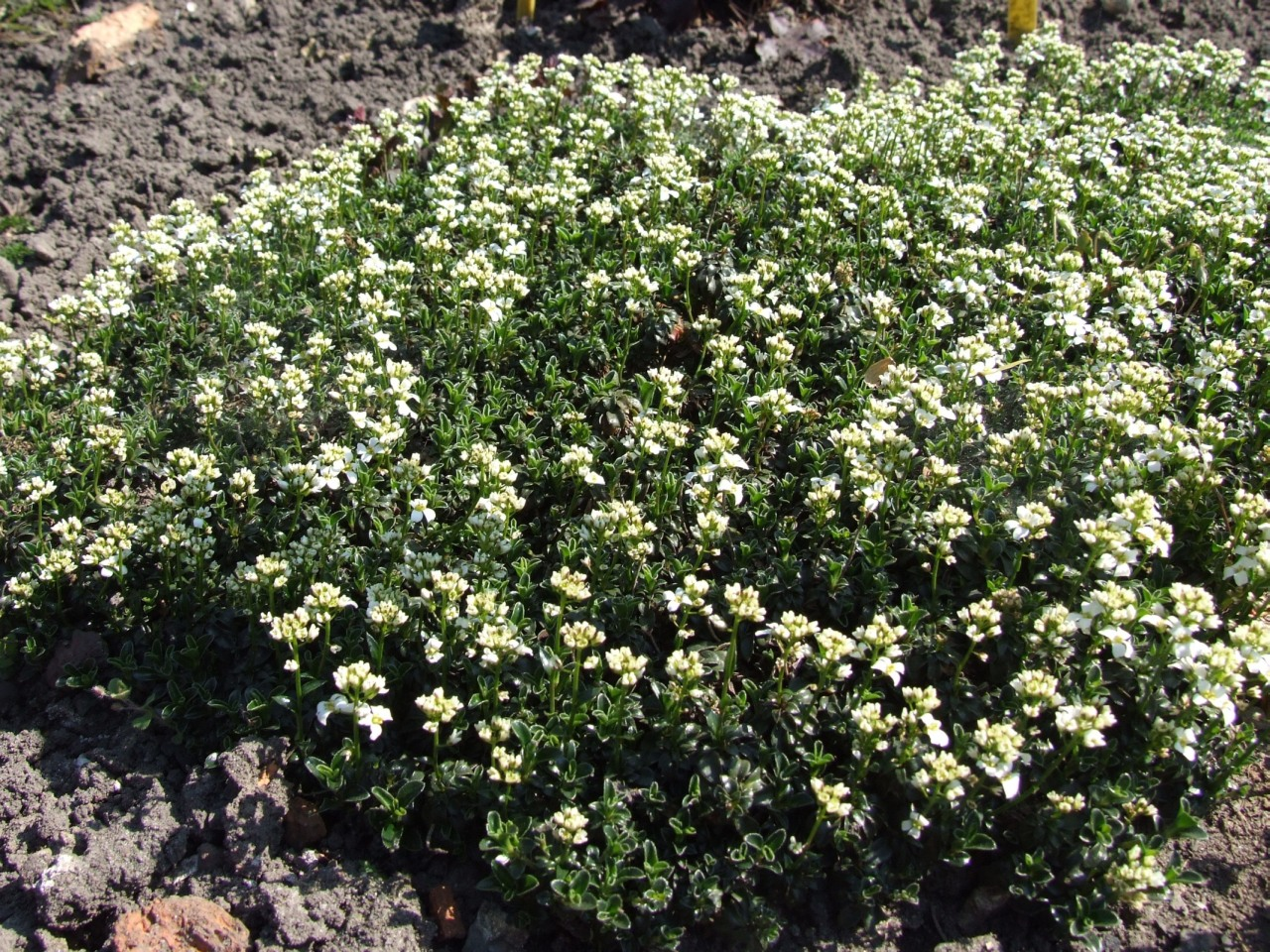

Scientific classification
- Kingdom: Plantae
- Clade: Tracheophytes
- Clade: Angiosperms
- Clade: Eudicots
- Clade: Rosids
- Order: Brassicales
- Family: Brassicaceae
- Genus: Arabis
- Species: A. procurrens
- Variety: A. p. var. ferdinandi-coburgi

Trinomial name
- Arabis procurrens var. ferdinandi-coburgi (Kellerer & Sünd.) Govaerts

Synonyms
- Arabis ferdinandi-coburgi Kellerer & Sünd.

= Arabis procurrens var. ferdinandi-coburgi =

Variety of flowering plant

Arabis procurrens var. ferdinandi-coburgi is a variety of flowering plant in the genus Arabis belonging to the family Brassicaceae. It was first described as Arabis ferdinandi-coburgi in 1903 by Johann Kellerer and Franz Sündermann, and was named after Tsar Ferdinand I of Bulgaria.

The stem of the plant is 6–12 cm high. The inflorescence is apical and racemose, and white in colour. Petals reach a length of 7–9 mm and have an oblong obovate shape. The fruits are bare linear pods, the seeds are brown. Arabis ferdinandi-coburgii blooms in June–July, fruiting in August–September. It is pollinated by insects.

This plant is endemic to the Pirin mountain range of Bulgaria, where it grows in the high mountain belt on calcareous rocky and stony terrains - rocky meadows, terraces and rock crevices. Populations are spatially isolated, fragmented, formed by single plants or small groups of several individual plants.

It is found at elevations between 2,000 m and 2,800 m on the slopes of the summits of Vihren, Banski Suhodol, Bayuvi Dupki and Kamenitisa, Razlozhki Suhodol, the cirque Golemiya Kazan, and the Sredonosa ridge, all situated in northern Pirin, within the limits of Pirin National Park.

== See also ==
- List of Arabis species
