= Arabis cypria =

Scientific classification
- Kingdom: Plantae
- Clade: Tracheophytes
- Clade: Angiosperms
- Clade: Eudicots
- Clade: Rosids
- Order: Brassicales
- Family: Brassicaceae
- Genus: Arabis
- Species: A. cypria

Binomial name
- Arabis cypria Holmboe, 1914

Species of plant

Arabis cypria is a flowering plant in the family Brassicaceae, endemic to mountainous areas of Northern Cyprus.

== Description ==
Arabis cypria is a tufted perennial to 25 cm, the basal leaves softly hairy, in dense rosettes, spoon-shaped with wavy or bluntly toothed edges; flowering stems (alongside leafy shoots) carry a few smaller leaves and a lengthening raceme of white-to-pink flowers 12 mm across. Pods straight or curved, 2–4 cm long, often all spreading in one direction. Flowers from Mars to April.

== Habitat ==
On shady limestone rocks at high altitudes.

== Distribution ==
From St Hilarion to Alevkaya, Kantara and the Karpas Peninsula.

== See also ==
- List of Arabis species
