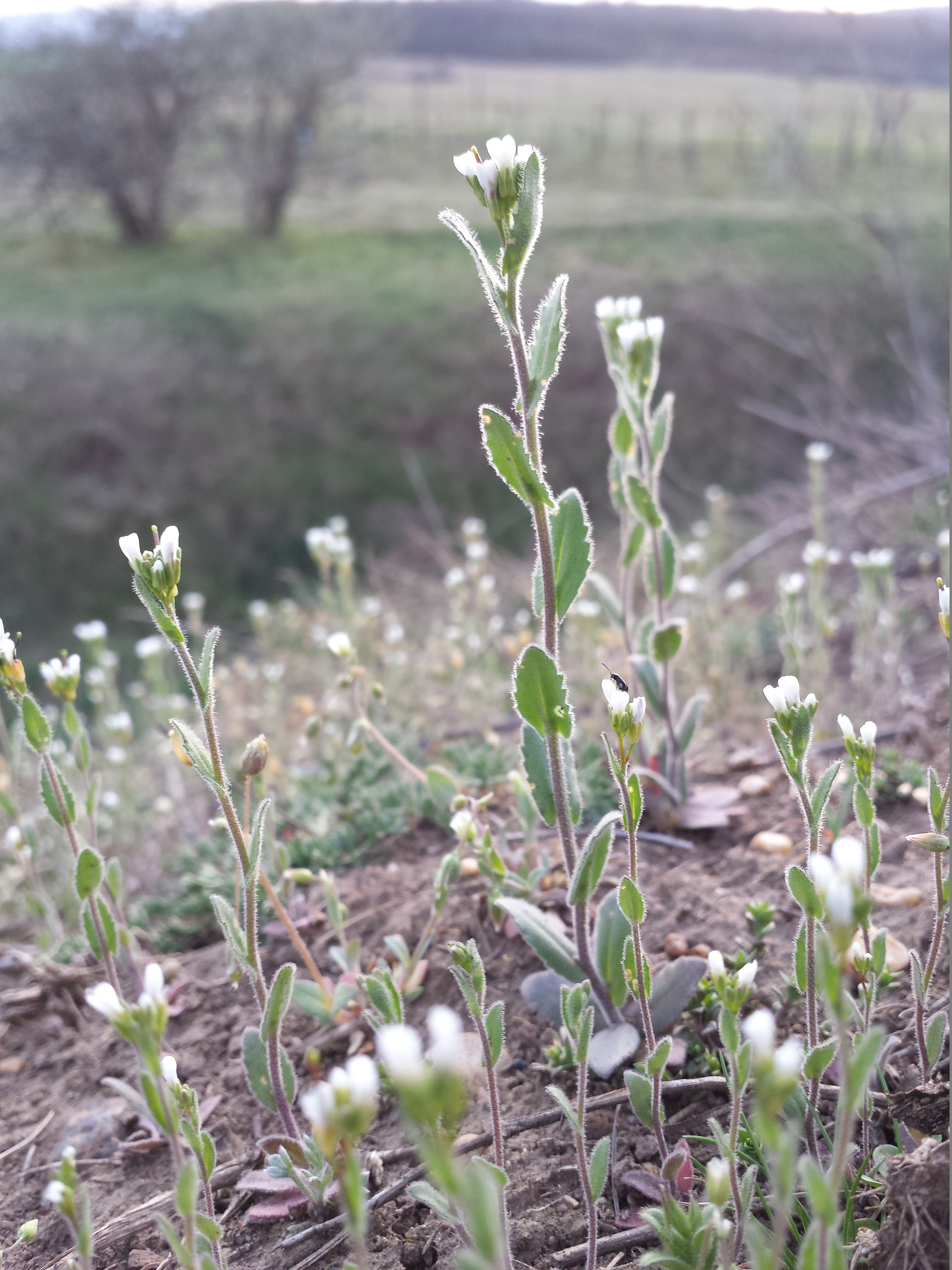

Scientific classification
- Kingdom: Plantae
- Clade: Tracheophytes
- Clade: Angiosperms
- Clade: Eudicots
- Clade: Rosids
- Order: Brassicales
- Family: Brassicaceae
- Genus: Arabis
- Species: A. auriculata

Binomial name
- Arabis auriculata Lam., 1783

Synonyms
- Arabis recta Arabis malinvaldiana

= Arabis auriculata =

Species of plant

Arabis auriculata is a herbaceous, flowering plant from the family Brassicaceae. It flowers from March to July.

Besides the type form, René Maire described the Arabis auriculata f. umbrosa form.

The species Draba nuda has been described as resembling A. auriculata, being originally placed in its genus.

== Distribution ==
Arabis auriculata grows mostly in calcareous soil. It can be found in south and central Europe, west and center-west of Asia and some parts of northern Africa, being present on foothills between 500 and 2400 meters high. The plant used to be present in Portugal, but has been wiped out from the country. Belgium registers it as an invasive species.

== See also ==
- List of Arabis species
