= Arabis dolichothrix =

Scientific classification
- Kingdom: Plantae
- Clade: Tracheophytes
- Clade: Angiosperms
- Clade: Eudicots
- Clade: Rosids
- Order: Brassicales
- Family: Brassicaceae
- Genus: Arabis
- Species: A. dolichothrix

Binomial name
- Arabis dolichothrix (N.Busch) N.Busch

Synonyms
- Arabis albida var. dolichothrix N.Busch (1906) (basionym); Arabis caucasica var. dolichothrix (N.Busch) Grossh.

Species of flowering plant

Arabis dolichothrix is a species of flowering plant in the family Brassicaceae. It is a subshrub native to the central and eastern Transcaucasus.
