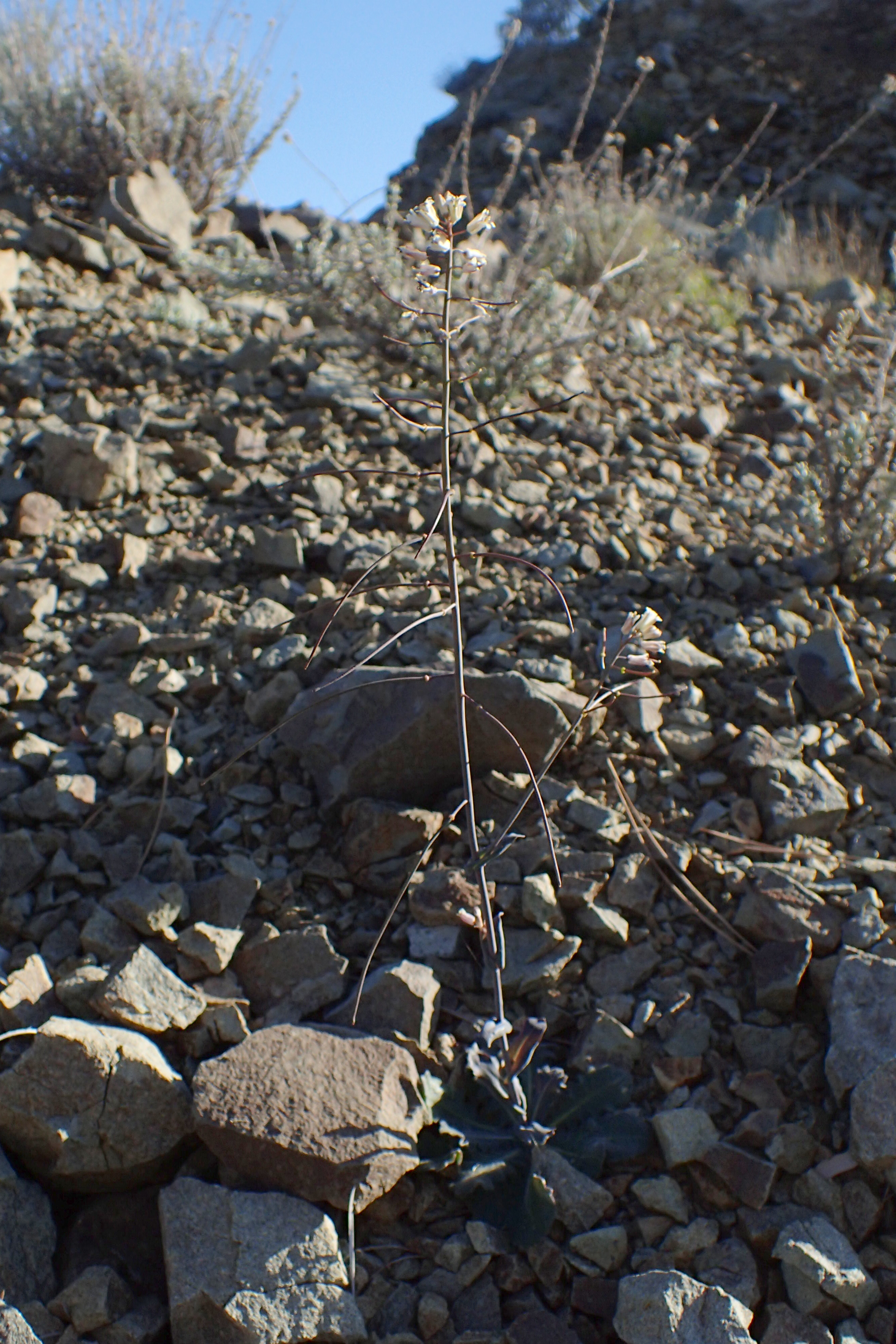

Conservation status
- Critically Endangered (IUCN 3.1)

Scientific classification
- Kingdom: Plantae
- Clade: Tracheophytes
- Clade: Angiosperms
- Clade: Eudicots
- Clade: Rosids
- Order: Brassicales
- Family: Brassicaceae
- Genus: Arabis
- Species: A. kennedyae

Binomial name
- Arabis kennedyae Meikle

= Arabis kennedyae =

Species of plant

Arabis kennedyae, the Troodos rockcress, is a species of flowering plant in the family Brassicaceae. It is endemic to Cyprus. Its natural habitat is Mediterranean-type shrubby vegetation. It is threatened by habitat loss.

== Description ==
The Troodos rockcress is a herbaceous plant measuring less than 30 cm in height. The stems are upright and purplish. The basal leaves make rosettes and can be up to 6 cm long and 2 cm wide, while the cauline leaves are shorter. The plant's produces loose bunches of small, unremarkable white flowers with four petals. The thin fruits are 25–40 mm long and resemble extensions of the stem. Mature fruits dry out and split into two parts, leaving behind a central membrane that holds the small seeds.

== Distribution and habitat ==
The Troodos rockcress is endemic to the central Troodos and Tripylos mountains on the island of Cyprus. It inhabits semi-shaded, open rocky areas at the edges of forests or near streams with golden oak and Calabrian pine. It is found at elevations of 1200–1400 m.

== Ecology ==
The plant's flowering period lasts from March or April to May. The species is variably annual or biennial. Wetter conditions allow the species to survive the summer drought and survive for two years. Its spreads its seeds using wind or water in streams.

== Conservation ==
The Troodos rockcress is listed as being critically endangered on the IUCN Red List due to its small range and population, as well as declining habitat quality in its range. The species was last assessed in 2006, when it was thought to have a total range of less than two square kilometres and a population of less than 100 individuals. More recent surveys conducted between 2006 and 2011 estimate that the range is around 14 square kilometres, with a total population of around 10,000 plants, and recommend downgrading the species' conservation status to endangered. The species' population can vary considerably year-to-year due to its annual/biennial nature and changes in environmental conditions. Threats to the species include habitat loss and habitat degradation caused by human development, road construction, forest fires, and excessive human presence. The rockcress's seeds are not resistant to fire and may be especially affected by forest fires.

The Troodos rockcress is protected under Appendix I of the Berne Convention and is a priority species under Annexes II and IV of the Habitats Directive. It is recognised as an endangered species in Cyprus. The species occurs entirely within Troodos National Forest Park and Paphos State Forest, which are protected under the Natura 2000 program. The subpopulation on Tripylos Mountain is also recognised as a Plant Micro-Reserve under Cypriot law. The rockcress's seeds are stored at seed banks at the University of Athens, Frederick University, and the Cyprus Agricultural Research Institute.

== See also ==
- List of Arabis species
