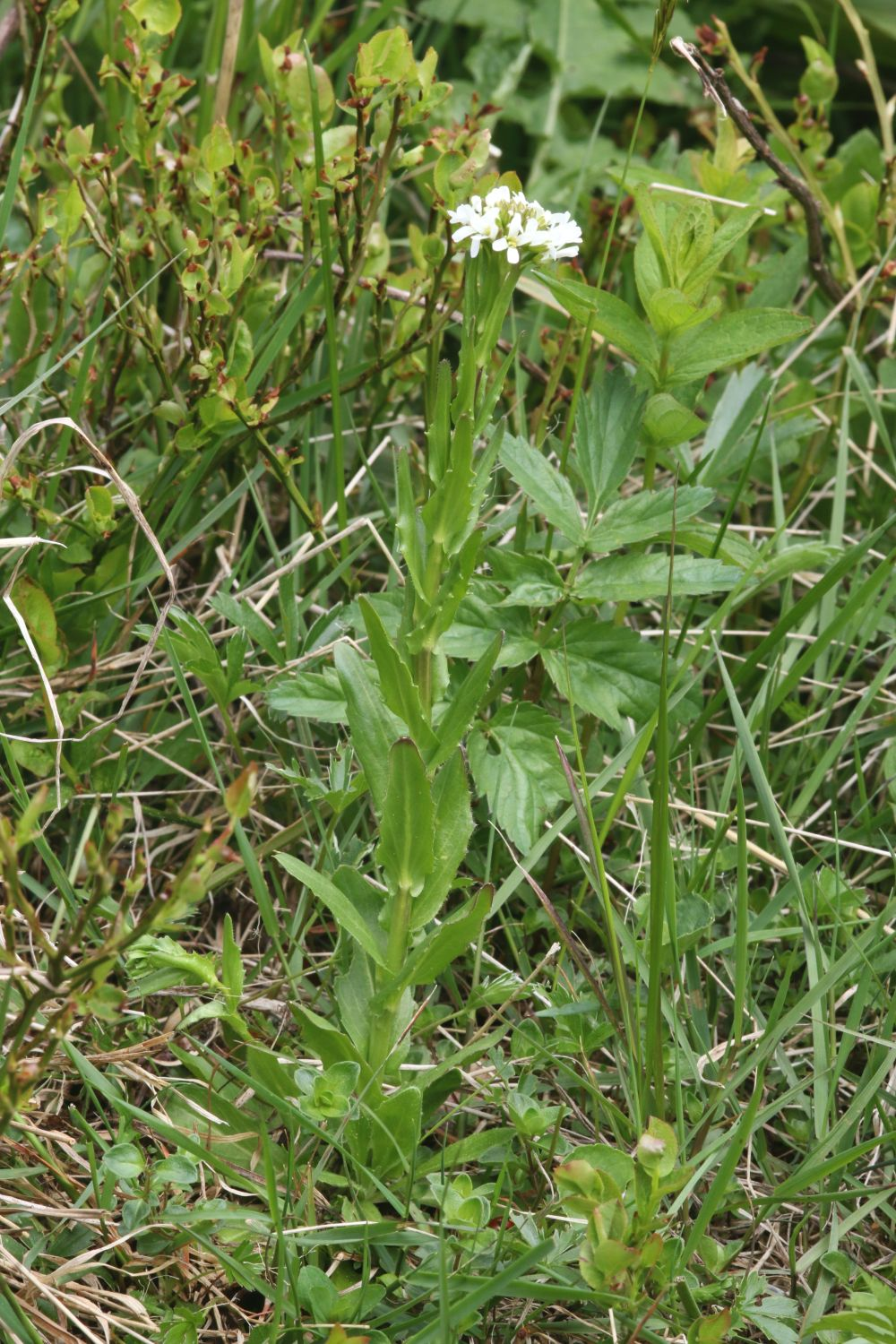

Scientific classification
- Kingdom: Plantae
- Clade: Tracheophytes
- Clade: Angiosperms
- Clade: Eudicots
- Clade: Rosids
- Order: Brassicales
- Family: Brassicaceae
- Genus: Arabis
- Species: A. sudetica

Binomial name
- Arabis sudetica Tausch

Synonyms
- Arabis abietina Bornm.; Arabis allionii subsp. sudetica (Tausch) Soják; Arabis bosniaca (Beck) Beck; Arabis contracta subsp. sudetica (Tausch) Čelak.; Arabis constricta Griseb.; Arabis hirsuta var. glabrescens Boiss.; Arabis jacquinii var. bosniaca Beck

= Arabis sudetica =

Genus of flowering plants

Arabis sudetica is a species of flowering plant in the family Brassicaceae. It is a perennial native to east-central and southeastern Europe and Turkey.
