= Arabis kazbegi =

Conservation status
- Vulnerable (IUCN 3.1)

Scientific classification
- Kingdom: Plantae
- Clade: Tracheophytes
- Clade: Angiosperms
- Clade: Eudicots
- Clade: Rosids
- Order: Brassicales
- Family: Brassicaceae
- Genus: Arabis
- Species: A. kazbegi

Binomial name
- Arabis kazbegi Mtschkvet.

Species of plant

Arabis kazbegi, the Kazbegian rockcress, is a species of rockcress that is endemic to Georgia, and is known from Mtiuleti, the Devdaraki glacier, Mount Sabertse and Mount Kuro. It grows in subalpine and alpine moraines and scree at elevations of 2,500–3,200 m. It is threatened by natural disasters (especially mud streams), tourism and global climate change.

== See also ==
- List of Arabis species
