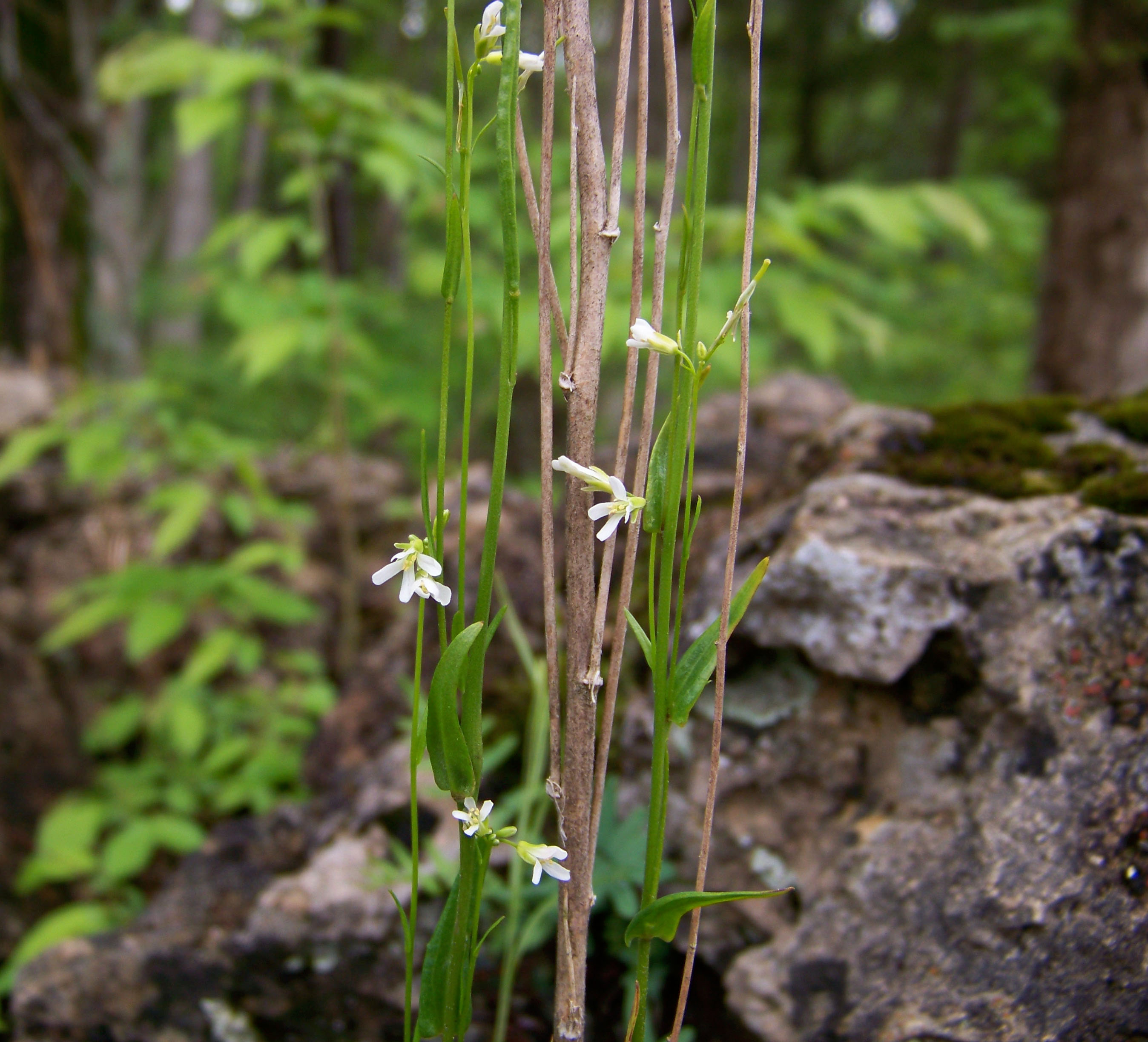

Conservation status
- Secure (NatureServe)

Scientific classification
- Kingdom: Plantae
- Clade: Tracheophytes
- Clade: Angiosperms
- Clade: Eudicots
- Clade: Rosids
- Order: Brassicales
- Family: Brassicaceae
- Genus: Arabis
- Species: A. pycnocarpa

Binomial name
- Arabis pycnocarpa M.Hopkins

Synonyms
- Arabis hirsuta var. pycnocarpa

= Arabis pycnocarpa =

Species of plant

Arabis pycnocarpa, the slender rock cress, is a species of flowering plant in the family Brassicaceae. It is native to North America and eastern Asia, being found in rocky, calcareous areas.

== Description ==
It is a small perennial or biennial that has white flowers in the spring. Two varieties have been named that are distinguished by pubescence differences:

- Arabis pycnocarpa var. adpressipilis – native only to eastern North America
- Arabis pycnocarpa var. pycnocarpa – widespread across North America and Asia

== See also ==
- List of Arabis species
