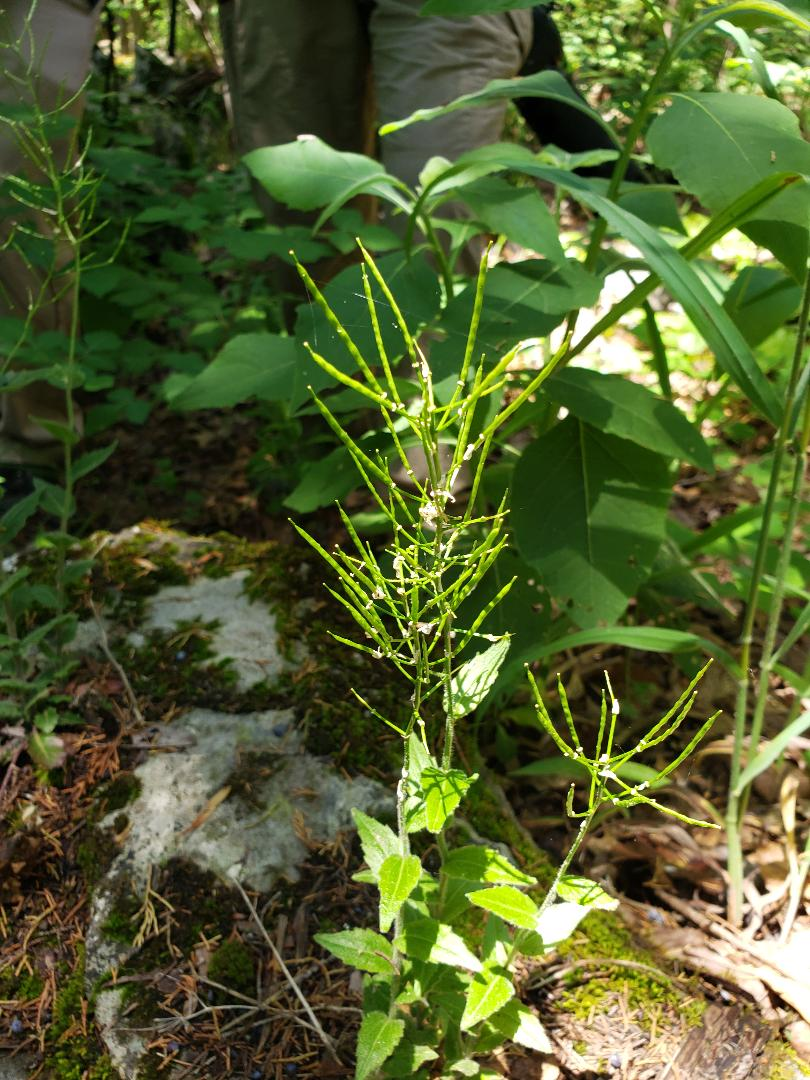

Conservation status
- Vulnerable (NatureServe)

Scientific classification
- Kingdom: Plantae
- Clade: Tracheophytes
- Clade: Angiosperms
- Clade: Eudicots
- Clade: Rosids
- Order: Brassicales
- Family: Brassicaceae
- Genus: Arabis
- Species: A. patens

Binomial name
- Arabis patens Sull.

Synonyms
- Boechera patens (Sull.) Al-Shehbaz; Erysimum patens (Sull.) Kuntze

= Arabis patens =

Species of flowering plant

Arabis patens, commonly called spreading rockcress, is a species of flowering plant in the mustard family (Brassicaceae). It is a short-lived biennial forb native to North America. Its natural habitat is xeric soil, often on calcareous substrates. It produces white flowers in the spring.

The species was first described in 1819 by William Starling Sullivant and placed in the genus Arabis. In 2003 Ihsan Ali Al-Shehbaz moved the species, along with the other North American species of Arabis, to genus Boechera based on genetic and cytological data. In phylogenetic study published in 2010, Koch et al. placed A. patens in genus Arabis, in a North American clade that also includes A. blepharophylla, A. aculeolata, A. macdonaldiana, A. oregana, A. modesta, A. crucisetosa, A. nuttallii, A. furcata, and A. georgiana.

== Distribution and habitat ==
Arabis patens is found in the United States in the states of Alabama, Tennessee, North Carolina, Virginia, West Virginia, Kentucky, Indiana, Ohio, and Pennsylvania. It grows in rocky wooded slopes, limestone bluffs, and along shady stream banks.
