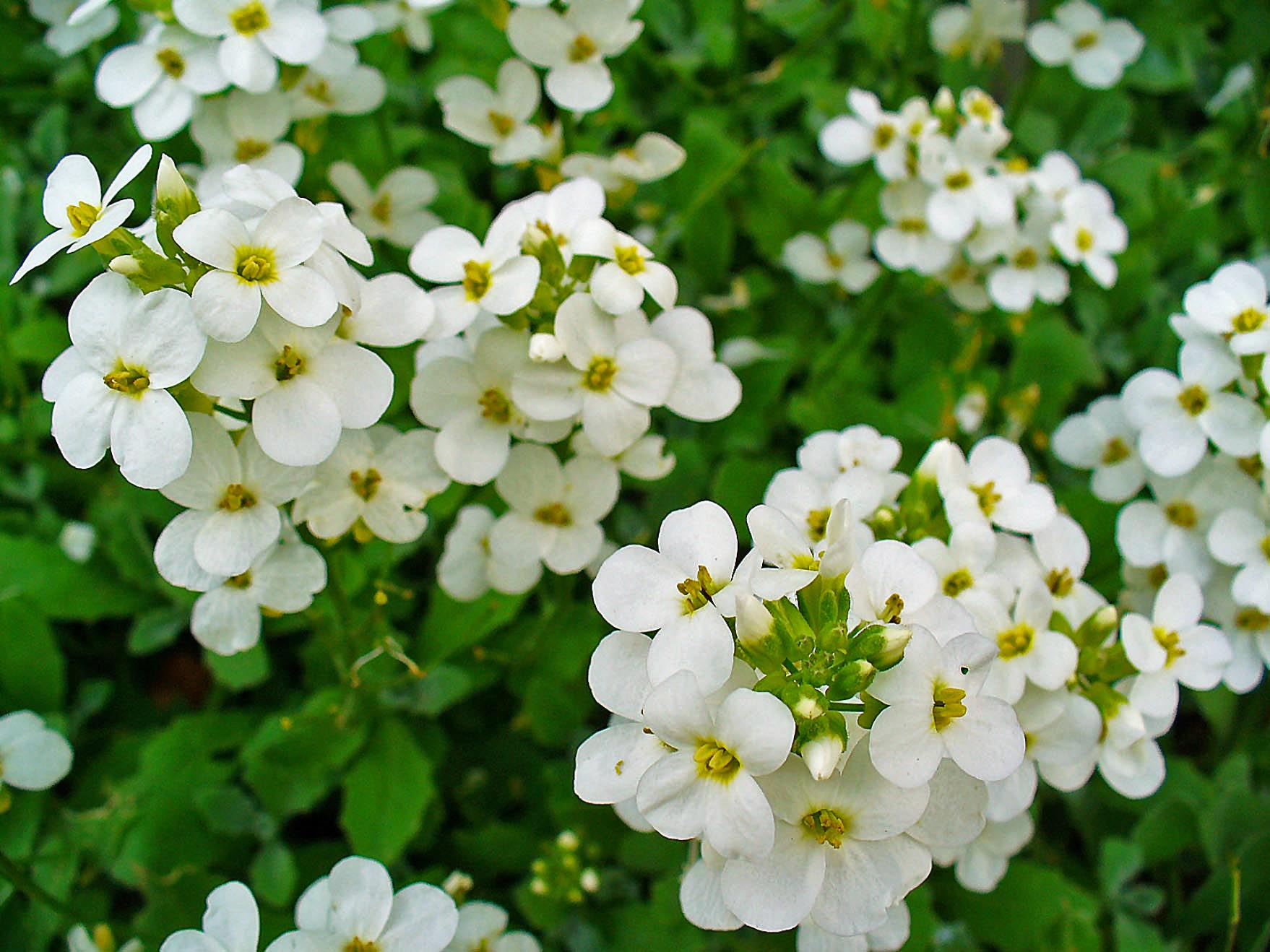

Scientific classification
- Kingdom: Plantae
- Clade: Tracheophytes
- Clade: Angiosperms
- Clade: Eudicots
- Clade: Rosids
- Order: Brassicales
- Family: Brassicaceae
- Genus: Arabis
- Species: A. caucasica

Binomial name
- Arabis caucasica Willd.

Synonyms
- List: Arabis albida Steven ex M.Bieb.; Arabis albida Steven ex M.Bieb.; Arabis albida f. racemopuberula N.Busch; Arabis albida var. umbrosa Boiss.; Arabis albida variegata Abbey; Arabis alpina Georgi; Arabis alpina subsp. caucasica (Willd.) Briq.; Arabis alpina var. commutata Pau & Font Quer; Arabis alpina subsp. flavescens (Griseb.) Hayek; Arabis alpina var. flavescens Griseb.; Arabis billardieri DC.; Arabis caucasica subsp. flavescens (Griseb.) F.K.Mey.; Arabis caucasica var. leiopoda Pau; Arabis longifolia DC.; Arabis olympica Sibth. ex DC.; Arabis sicula Steven; Arabis tenorei A.Huet ex Nyman; Arabis thyrsoidea Sm.; Arabis viscosa DC.; Cardamine viscosa S.G.Gmel. ex DC.; Cheiranthus mollis Hornem.; Crucifera albida E.H.L.Krause; Erysimum albidum (Steven ex M.Bieb.) Kuntze

= Arabis caucasica =

Species of plant

Arabis caucasica is a species of flowering plant in the mustard family (Brassicaceae) known by the common names garden arabis, mountain rock cress or Caucasian rockcress.

== Distribution and habitat ==
It is native to Crimea, Turkey, Iran, Caucasus and the Mediterranean. It grows in crevices of limestone rocks, streams and alpine meadows.

== Description ==
Arabis caucasica is an evergreen perennial herb growing up to 1 ft (0.30 m) by 1.5 ft (0.46 m). It flowers in early spring and has white petals.

== Cultivation ==
It is hardy to zones 4-9 and is not frost tender. A popular ornamental garden plant for its early flowers, cultivars include the pink 'Compinkie'. Under its putative synonym A. alpina subsp. caucasica, the cultivars 'Flore Pleno' and 'Schneehaube' have gained the Royal Horticultural Society's Award of Garden Merit.

== See also ==
- List of Arabis species
