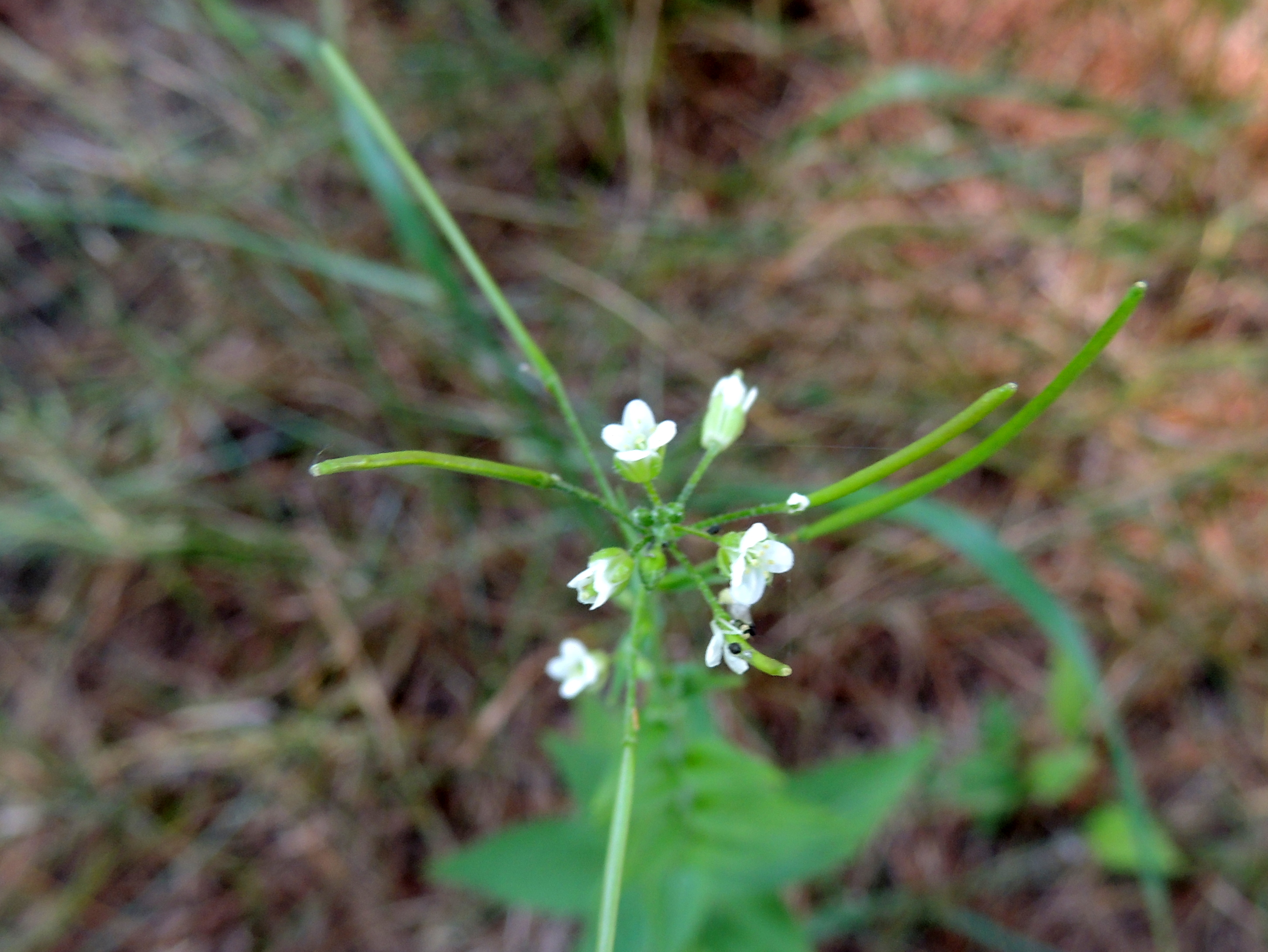

Scientific classification
- Kingdom: Plantae
- Clade: Tracheophytes
- Clade: Angiosperms
- Clade: Eudicots
- Clade: Rosids
- Order: Brassicales
- Family: Brassicaceae
- Genus: Catolobus (C.A.Mey.) Al-Shehbaz
- Species: C. pendulus

Binomial name
- Catolobus pendulus (L.) Al-Shehbaz

= Catolobus =

Genus of flowering plants

Catolobus is a genus of flowering plants in the family Brassicaceae. It is monotypic, being represented by the single species Catolobus pendulus.

Its native range is from eastern Europe to temperate Asia.
