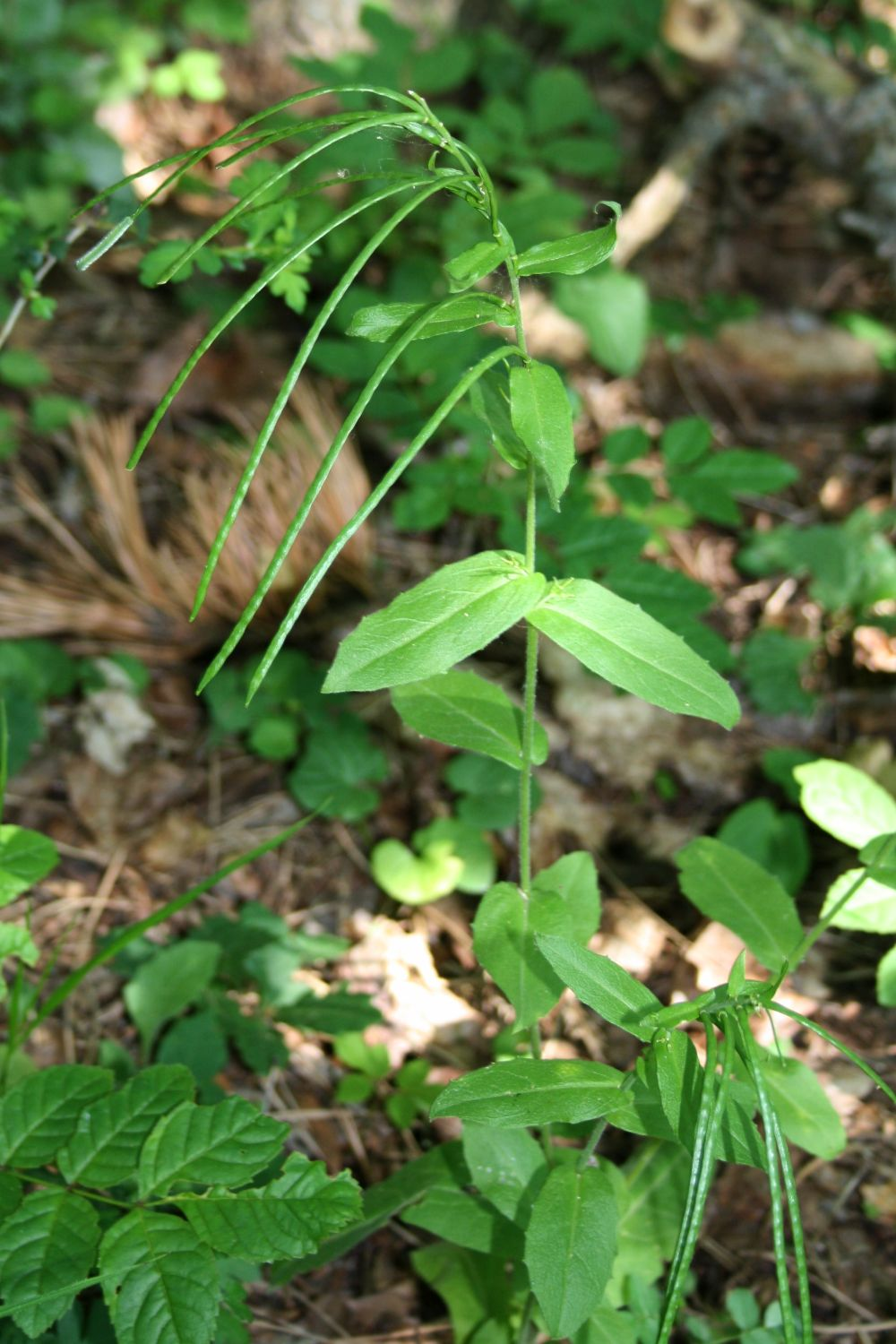

Scientific classification
- Kingdom: Plantae
- Clade: Tracheophytes
- Clade: Angiosperms
- Clade: Eudicots
- Clade: Rosids
- Order: Brassicales
- Family: Brassicaceae
- Genus: Pseudoturritis
- Species: P. turrita

Binomial name
- Pseudoturritis turrita (L.) Al-Shehbaz

Synonyms
- Synonymy: Turrita Wallr.; Brassica turrita (L.) Lyons; Erysimum turrita (L.) Kuntze; Arabis elongata Salisb.; Arabis eriocarpa Schur; Arabis gerardi subsp. longisiliqua (Wallr.) Lönnr.; Arabis lateripendens St.-Lag.; Arabis longisiliqua Wallr.; Arabis major Gray; Arabis ochroleuca (Lam.) Lam.; Arabis pendula Lachen. ex Rchb.; Arabis purpurascens C.Presl; Arabis rugosa Moench; Arabis turrita L. (1753) (basionym); Arabis turrita var. lasiocarpa Rouy & Foucaud; Arabis turrita var. leiocarpa Rouy & Foucaud; Arabis turriti Clairv.; Arabis umbrosa Crantz; Crucifera umbrosa (Crantz) E.H.L.Krause; Erysimum ochroleucum (Lam.) Kuntze; Erysimum preslianum Kuntze; Turrita major Wallr.; Turrita ochroleuca (Lam.) Bubani; Turritis elongata Raeusch.; Turritis ochroleuca Lam.; Turritis pendula Desf.

= Pseudoturritis =

Species of flowering plant

Pseudoturritis is a genus of flowering plants belonging to the family Brassicaceae. It contains a single species, Pseudoturritis turrita, a biennial or perennial native to central and southern Europe, Algeria, the Caucasus, and the Levant.
