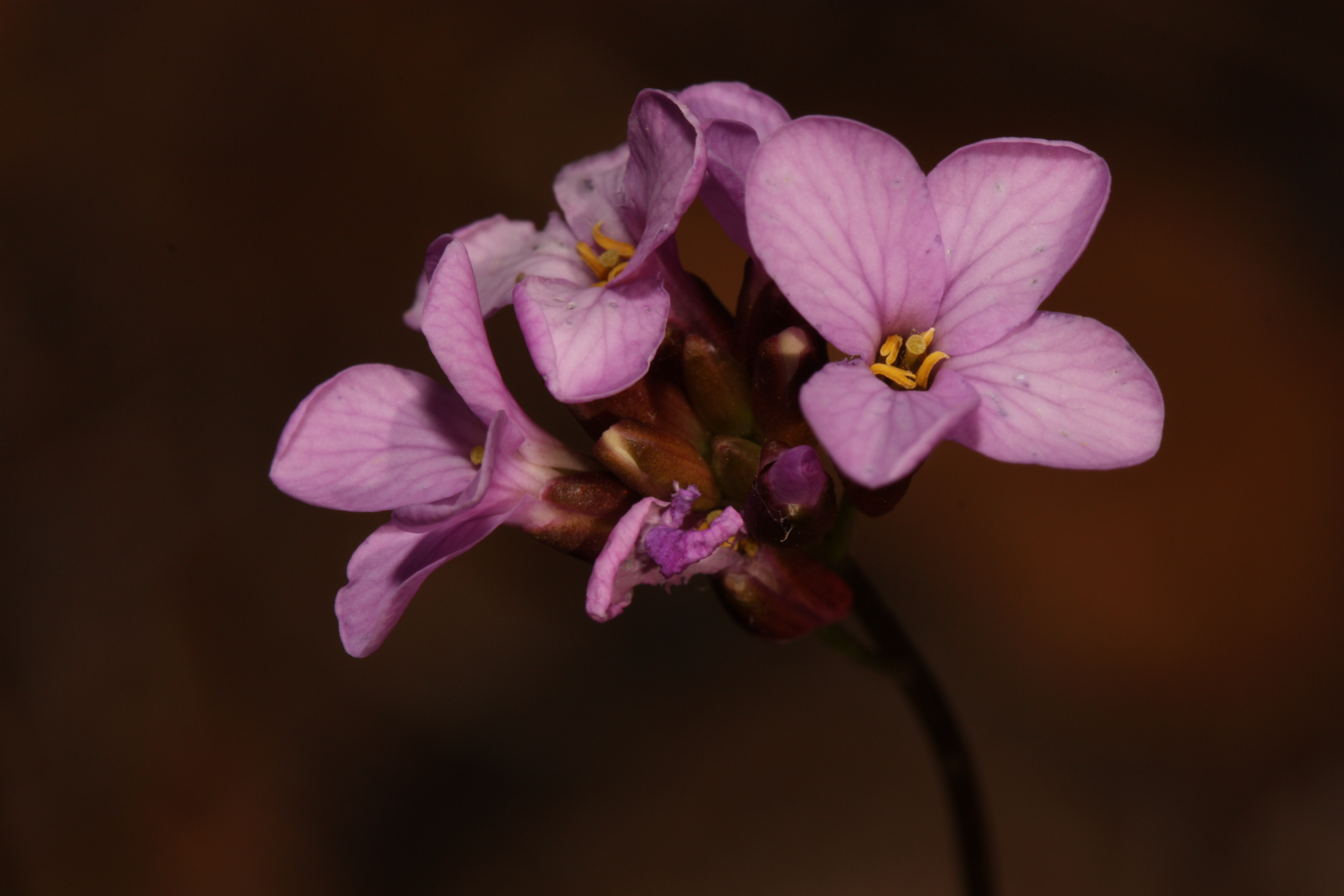

Conservation status
- Apparently Secure (NatureServe)

Scientific classification
- Kingdom: Plantae
- Clade: Tracheophytes
- Clade: Angiosperms
- Clade: Eudicots
- Clade: Rosids
- Order: Brassicales
- Family: Brassicaceae
- Genus: Arabis
- Species: A. aculeolata

Binomial name
- Arabis aculeolata Greene

= Arabis aculeolata =

Species of plant

Arabis aculeolata is a species of flowering plant in the mustard family known by the common name Waldo rockcress.

== Description ==
This is a perennial herb growing from a tough caudex covered in large hairs and the bases of leaves shed in previous seasons. It produces one or more upright stems to heights between 20 and 35 centimetres (7.9 and 13.8 in). The stems are dark in color, often reddish or purplish, and are coated in stiff white hairs. The leaves form a basal rosette about the caudex. They are oval-shaped, green in color and sparsely covered in coarse white hairs, up to 4 centimetres (1.6 in) long, and with smooth or wavy edges. Leaves located higher up the stem are smaller. The flowers have dark purple sepals and lighter purple petals. The fruit is a long, thin, upright silique up to 6.5 centimetres (2.6 in) long. The bloom period is between the months of April, May and June. The leaves shape is elliptic, oblanceolate, and obovate. The leaf margin is entire. The inflorescence is raceme. The bloom color is pink or purple.

Some plants in the 1940s seem intermediate between Arabis aculeolata and Arabis modesta. However, this has not been confirmed.

== Distribution and habitat ==
It is native to a small range in the mountains of southern Oregon, where it is an uncommon member of the serpentine soils flora. It is typically found in the counties of Del Norte and Siskiyou in California. It is also found in the counties of Curry, Josephine, Jackson, and Douglas in Oregon.

It has a global rank of G4, which means apparently secure. It has a S3 rank in Oregon, meaning vulnerable, and a S2 rank in California, meaning imperiled. The global status was last reviewed in 1989.

Its communities include, yellow pine forest, red fir forest, lodgepole pine forest, and mixed evergreen forest. It is found in rocky hillsides and serpentine soils. It is also found at elevations of 200–1,800 m (660–5,910 ft).
