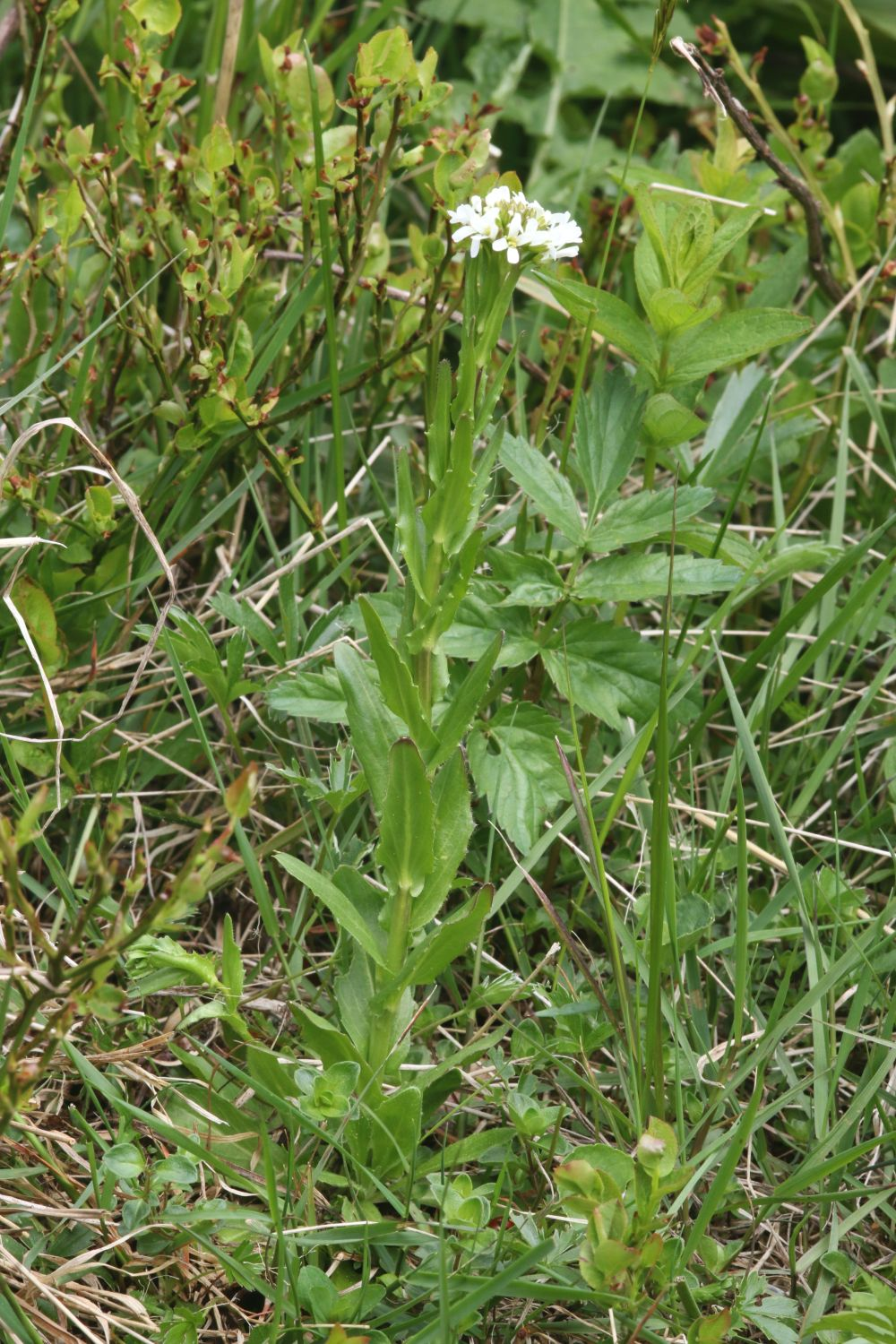
- Habit
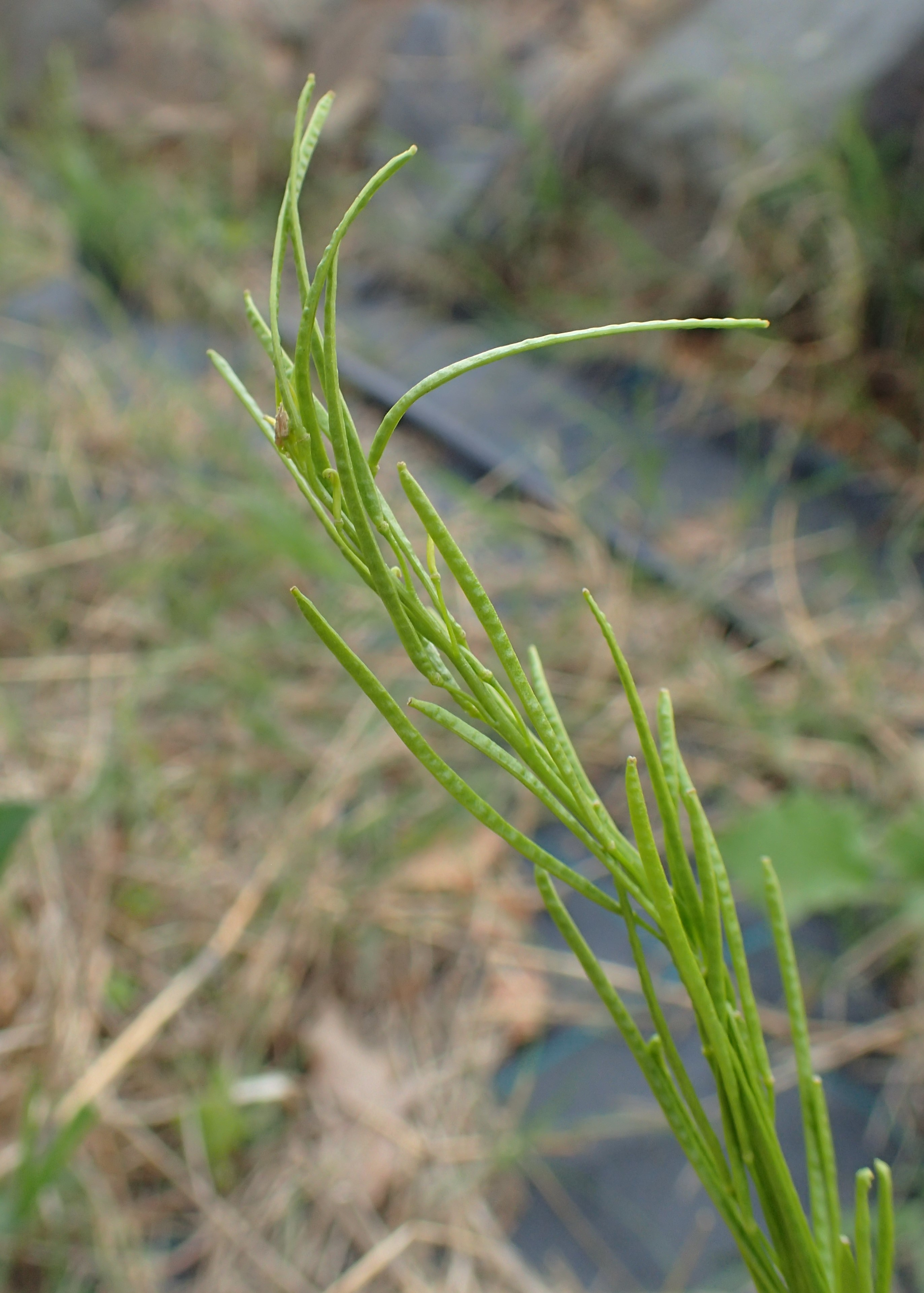
- Siliques

Scientific classification
- Kingdom: Plantae
- Clade: Tracheophytes
- Clade: Angiosperms
- Clade: Eudicots
- Clade: Rosids
- Order: Brassicales
- Family: Brassicaceae
- Genus: Arabis
- Species: A. allionii

Binomial name
- Arabis allionii DC.

Synonyms
- List: Arabis bitolica Velen.; Arabis hirsuta subsp. allionii (DC.) Rouy & Foucaud; Arabis hirsuta var. allionii (DC.) Burnat; Arabis nutans Sims; Erysimum allionii (DC.) Kuntze; Turritis stricta All.

= Arabis allionii =

Species of plant

Arabis allionii is a species of flowering plant in the family Brassicaceae, native to the mountains of central and southern Europe and southern Turkey. The Royal Horticultural Society lists it as a garden plant for attracting pollinators, but gives its common name as "Siberian wallflower", suggesting that they have it confused with Erysimum × marshallii.
