= Scapiarabis =

Scientific classification
- Kingdom: Plantae
- Clade: Tracheophytes
- Clade: Angiosperms
- Clade: Eudicots
- Clade: Rosids
- Order: Brassicales
- Family: Brassicaceae
- Tribe: Arabideae
- Genus: Scapiarabis; M.Koch, R.Karl, D.A.German & Al-Shehbaz

Genus of flowering plants

Scapiarabis is a genus of flowering plants in the family Brassicaceae. It includes four species native to Central Asia, Xinjiang, the western Himalayas, Afghanistan, and Pakistan.

== Species ==
Four species are accepted.

- Scapiarabis ariana (Hedge) M.Koch, R.Karl, D.A.German & Al-Shehbaz
- Scapiarabis karategina (Lipsky) M.Koch, R.Karl, D.A.German & Al-Shehbaz
- Scapiarabis popovii (Botsch. & Vved.) M.Koch, R.Karl, D.A.German & Al-Shehbaz
- Scapiarabis saxicola (Edgew.) M.Koch, R.Karl, D.A.German & Al-Shehbaz
