= Botschantzevia =

Scientific classification
- Kingdom: Plantae
- Clade: Tracheophytes
- Clade: Angiosperms
- Clade: Eudicots
- Clade: Rosids
- Order: Brassicales
- Family: Brassicaceae
- Tribe: Arabideae
- Genus: Botschantzevia; Nabiev
- Species: B. karatavica

Binomial name
- Botschantzevia karatavica (Lipsch. & Pavlov) Nabiev

Genus of flowering plants

Botschantzevia is a monotypic genus of flowering plants belonging to the family Brassicaceae. The only species in the genus is Botschantzevia karatavica.

Its native range is Central Asia.
