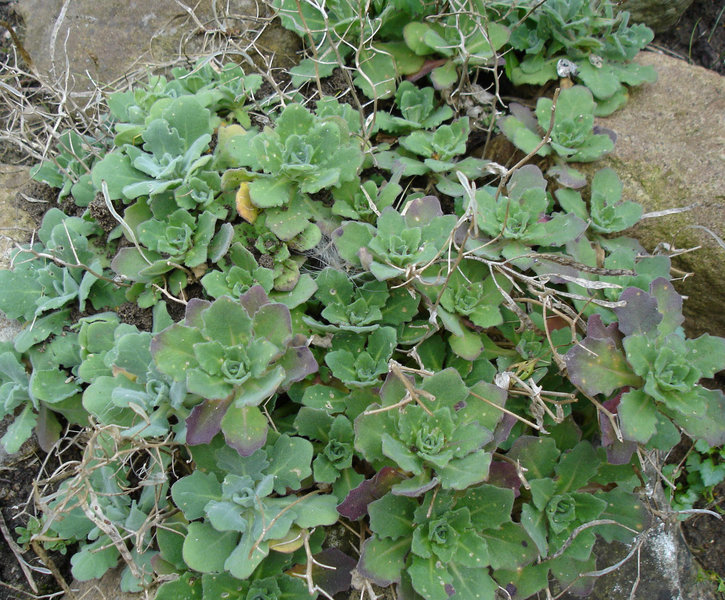
- Arabis ferdinandi-coburgii

Scientific classification
- Kingdom: Plantae
- Clade: Embryophytes
- Clade: Tracheophytes
- Clade: Angiosperms
- Clade: Eudicots
- Clade: Rosids
- Order: Brassicales
- Family: Brassicaceae
- Genus: Arabis; L.

Species
- See text

Synonyms
- Abasicarpon (Andrz. ex Rchb.) Rchb.; Abazicarpus Andrz. ex DC.; Arabidium Spach

= Arabis =

Genus of flowering plants in the cabbage family

Arabis /ˈærəbɪs/, or rockcress, is a genus of flowering plants, within the family Brassicaceae.

== Description ==
The species are herbaceous, annual or perennial plants, growing to 10–80 cm (3.9–31.5 in) tall, usually densely hairy, with simple entire to lobed leaves 1–6 cm (0.4–2.4 in) long, and small white four-petaled flowers. The fruit is a long, slender capsule containing 10–20 or more seeds. Natural habitat for Arabis species is rocky mountain/cliff sides or dry sites. Cultivation of Arabis is best suited for rock gardens or container gardens. This genus is pollinated by members of Apieae and Lepidoptera.

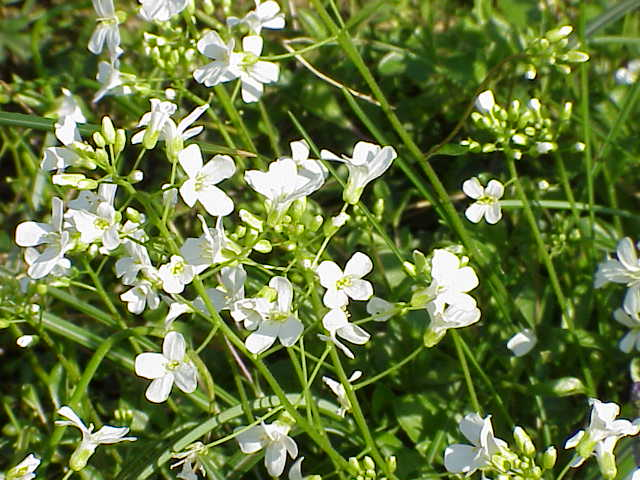
Arabis procurrens flowers

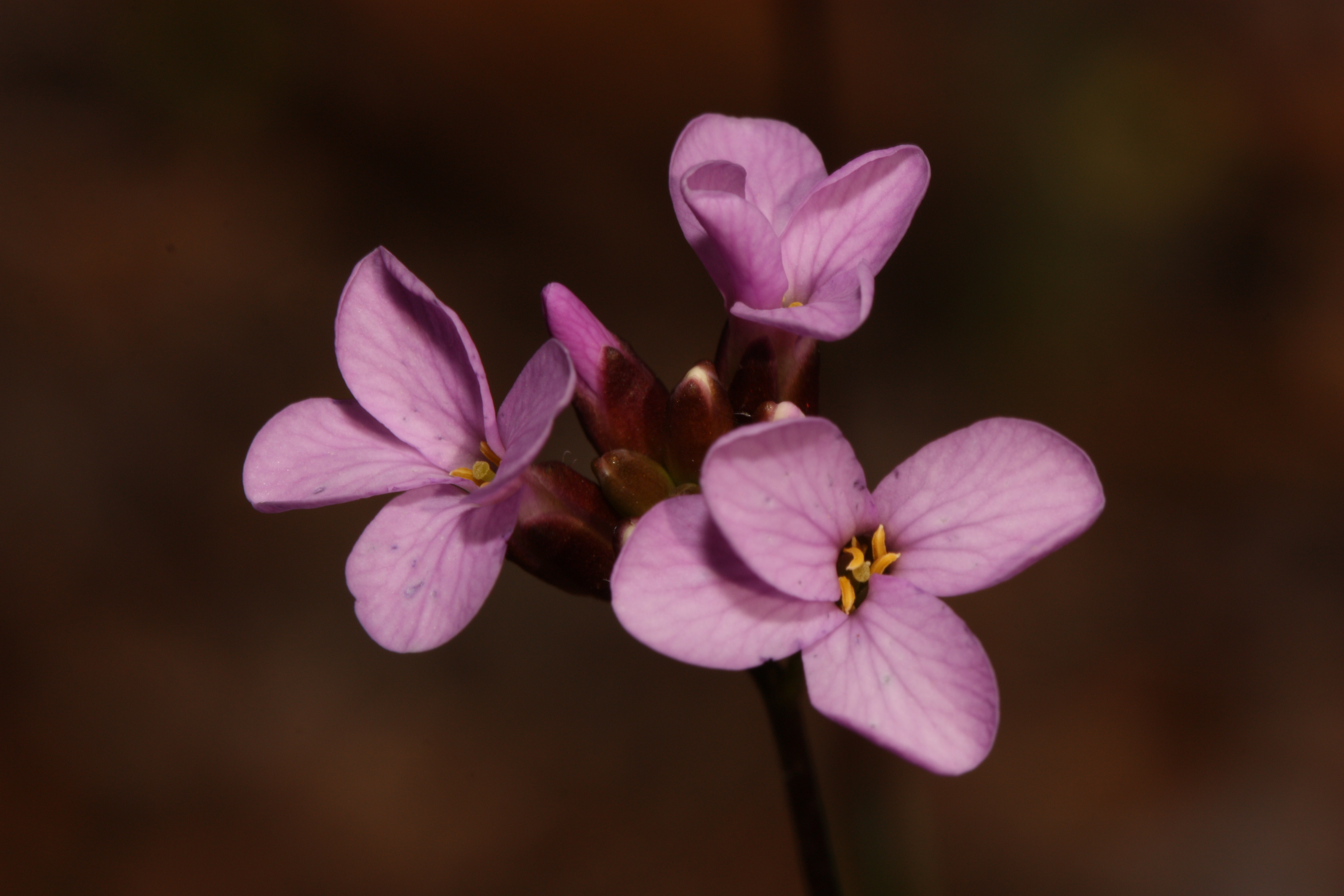
Arabis aculeolata

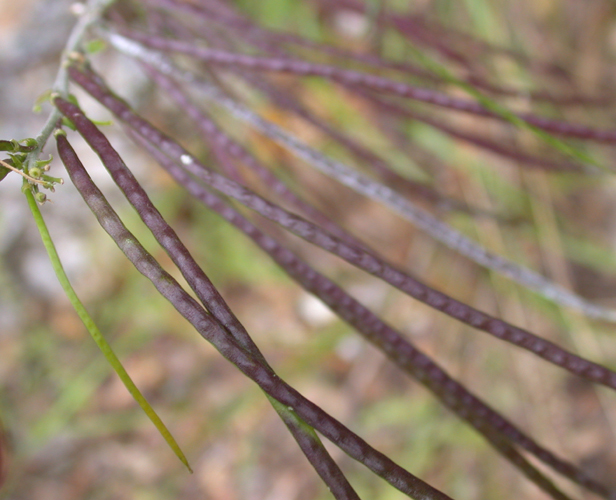
Siliques of Arabis turrita

== Taxonomy ==
Though traditionally recognized as a large genus with many Old World and New World members, more recent evaluations of the relationships among these species using genetic data suggest there are two major groups within the old genus Arabis. These two groups are not each other's closest relatives, so have been split into two separate genera. Most of the Old World members remain in the genus Arabis, whereas most of the New World members have been moved into the genus Boechera, with only a few remaining in Arabis.

=== Species ===
Selected species

- Arabis aculeolata Greene
- Arabis alpina L. – alpine rockcress
- Arabis armena N.Busch – Armenian rockcress
- Arabis auriculata Lam.
- Arabis blepharophylla Hook. & Arn. – coast rockcress
- Arabis caucasica Willd.
- Arabis cypria Holmboe
- Arabis glabra – tower mustard
- Arabis hirsuta (L.) Scop. – hairy rockcress
- Arabis kazbegi Mtshkvet. – Kazbegian rockcress
- Arabis kennedyae Meilke
- Arabis mcdonaldiana Eastw.
- Arabis procurrens Waldst. & Kit. – spreading rock cress
- Arabis pycnocarpa M.Hopkins – slender rock cress
- Arabis scabra All. – Bristol rockcress

== Cultivation ==
Some species, notably Arabis alpina, are cultivated as ornamental plants in gardens. Many others are regarded as weeds.
