= Thelypodieae =

Scientific classification
- Kingdom: Plantae
- Clade: Tracheophytes
- Clade: Angiosperms
- Clade: Eudicots
- Clade: Rosids
- Order: Brassicales
- Family: Brassicaceae
- Tribe: Thelypodieae; Prantl

Tribe of plants

Thelypodieae is a tribe of flowering plants in the family Brassicaceae.

== Taxonomy ==
Thelypodieae contains the following genera:

- Caulanthus S.Watson – synonym of Streptanthus
- Chaunanthus O.E.Schulz
- Chilocardamum O.E.Schulz
- Chlorocrambe Rydb.
- Dictyophragmus O.E.Schulz
- Dryopetalon A.Gray
- Englerocharis Muschl.
- Hesperidanthus Rydb.
- Hollermayera O.E.Schulz
- Ivania O.E.Schulz
- Mostacillastrum O.E.Schulz
- Neuontobotrys O.E.Schulz
- Parodiodoxa O.E.Schulz
- Phlebolobium O.E.Schulz
- Phravenia Al-Shehbaz & Warwick
- Polypsecadium O.E.Schulz
- Pringlea Anderson ex Hook.f.
- Raphanorhyncha Rollins
- Romanschulzia O.E.Schulz
- Sarcodraba Gilg & Muschl.
- Sibara Greene
- Stanleya Nutt.
- Streptanthella Rydb.
- Streptanthus Nutt.
- Terraria T.J.Hildebr. & Al-Shehbaz
- Thelypodiopsis Rydb.
- Thelypodium
- Thysanocarpus Endl.
- Warea Nutt.
- Weberbauera Gilg & Muschl.
- Zuloagocardamum Salariato & Al-Shehbaz
