= Thelypodiopsis juniperorum =

- Wilderness area Black Canyon of the Gunnison National Park

Conservation status
- Imperiled (NatureServe)

Scientific classification
- Kingdom: Plantae
- Clade: Tracheophytes
- Clade: Angiosperms
- Clade: Eudicots
- Clade: Rosids
- Order: Brassicales
- Family: Brassicaceae
- Genus: Thelypodiopsis
- Species: T. juniperorum

Binomial name
- Thelypodiopsis juniperorum (Payson) Rydb.

Synonyms
- Sisymbrium elegans var. juniperorum (Payson) H.D.Harr.; Sisymbrium juniperorum Payson

Plant species in the cabbage family

Thelypodiopsis juniperorum, the juniper tumblemustard, is a rare species in the cabbage family from western Colorado.

== Description ==
Juniper tumble-mustard is an annual plant that grows 15 to 100 centimeters (6–39 in) tall. Each plant can have one to a few stems branched from the base, which also branch towards the top. The stems are often pilose, covered in long, soft straight hairs, but might be hairless towards the top. However, the hairs at the nodes and base are flattened.

Plants do have basal leaves, but they do not last long. They are in a rosette and each is 5–15 cm (2–6 in) long and 1–2 cm (0.5–1 in) wide, attached by a 0.5–2.5 cm leaf stalk. Their shape is like a reversed spear head with the narrowest part above the midpoint, with edges that are smooth to irregularly toothed and a blunt point. The stem leaves have a base that surrounds or clasps the stem and an overall oblong shape, the uppermost becoming elongated and drooping when the plant is going to seed. They measure 1.5–8 cm (0.5–3 in) long.

The flowers are usually purple to lavender, but occasionally can be white. The four petal are almost circular to widely teardrop shaped, 14–17 mm long and 5–9 mm wide.

The fruits are a narrow almost round pods that separate into two halves when ripe, called siliques. They are 5–9 cm (2–3.5 in) long, but just 1–1.2 mm wide, straight, with small swellings over the seeds, and standing straight up or nearly so. The seeds measure around 1.5 by 0.9 mm.

== Taxonomy ==
In 1922 a new species in the Sisymbrium genus scientifically described by Edwin Blake Payson, who named it Sisymbrium juniperorum. He described it from a specimen collected 10 kilometers (6 mi) east of Montrose on 15 June 1915. In 1923, just one year after first publication, it was moved to Thelypodiopsis by Per Axel Rydberg. Although Harold Harrington proposed it be classified as a variety of Sisymbrium elegans in 1954, Thelypodiopsis juniperorum is the accepted name. Along with its genus it is part of the Brassicaceae family. Payson though it was halfway between Thelypodiopsis ambigua and Thelypodiopsis aurea, but Reed C. Rollins thought it more closely related to T. ambigua.

=== Names ===
Thelypodiopsis juniperorum is known by the common name juniper tumblemustard or juniper tumble-mustard.

== Range and habitat ==
Juniper tumble-mustard is a Colorado endemic, growing in just four western counties, Garfield in the north and Delta, Gunnison, and Montrose to the south. In 2020 there were just 17 known populations with 10 not observed for more than 20 years and at least one of them is likely to no longer exist. It has been recorded at elevations between 1,900 and 2,500 meters (6,200–8,200 ft).

The species is found pinyon–juniper woodlands and in shrublands of sagebrush, Gambel oak, or Utah serviceberry. Unlike the closely related west water tumble-mustard (Thelypodiopsis elegans), it tends to grow in better vegetated locations rather than in nearly barren "adobe" or gypsum soils. Juniper tumble-mustard is usually found on slopes, mesa tops, or canyon rims, in relative dry and well drained places, but has also been found in bottomlands.
