= Stenodraba =

Scientific classification
- Kingdom: Plantae
- Clade: Tracheophytes
- Clade: Angiosperms
- Clade: Eudicots
- Clade: Rosids
- Order: Brassicales
- Family: Brassicaceae
- Tribe: Thelypodieae
- Genus: Stenodraba; O.E.Schulz

Genus of flowering plants

Stenodraba is a genus of flowering plants in the family Brassicaceae. It includes five species native to Argentina and Chile.

== Species ==
Five species are accepted.

- Stenodraba chillanensis (Phil.) O.E.Schulz
- Stenodraba colchaguensis (Barnéoud) O.E.Schulz
- Stenodraba lechleri (E.Fourn.) Ravenna
- Stenodraba parvifolia (Phil.) O.E.Schulz
- Stenodraba stenophylla (Leyb.) O.E.Schulz
