= Phravenia =

Scientific classification
- Kingdom: Plantae
- Clade: Tracheophytes
- Clade: Angiosperms
- Clade: Eudicots
- Clade: Rosids
- Order: Brassicales
- Family: Brassicaceae
- Tribe: Thelypodieae
- Genus: Phravenia; Al-Shehbaz & Warwick
- Species: P. viereckii

Binomial name
- Phravenia viereckii (O.E.Schulz) Al-Shehbaz & Warwick

Synonyms
- Arabis endlichii O.E.Schulz; Arabis runcinata S.Watson; Arabis viereckii O.E.Schulz (1932) (basionym); Dryopetalon viereckii (O.E.Schulz) Al-Shehbaz; Sibara runcinata Rollins; Sibara runcinata var. brachycarpa Rollins; Sibara runcinata var. typica Rollins; Sibara viereckii (O.E.Schulz) Rollins; Sibara viereckii var. endlichii (O.E.Schulz) Rollins

Genus of flowering plants

Phravenia is a genus of flowering plants in the family Brassicaceae. It includes a single species, Phravenia viereckii, an annual native to deserts and dry shrublands in southern parts of the U.S. state of Texas and northeastern and central Mexico, ranging south to the state of Puebla.
