= Rockcress =

Rockcress is a common name used for several similar genera of flowering plants in the family Brassicaceae:

- Arabis, with primarily Old World species
- Arabidopsis, with primarily European species
- Boechera, with primarily North American species
- Braya longii, Long's northern rockcress
- Sibara, winged rockcresses
