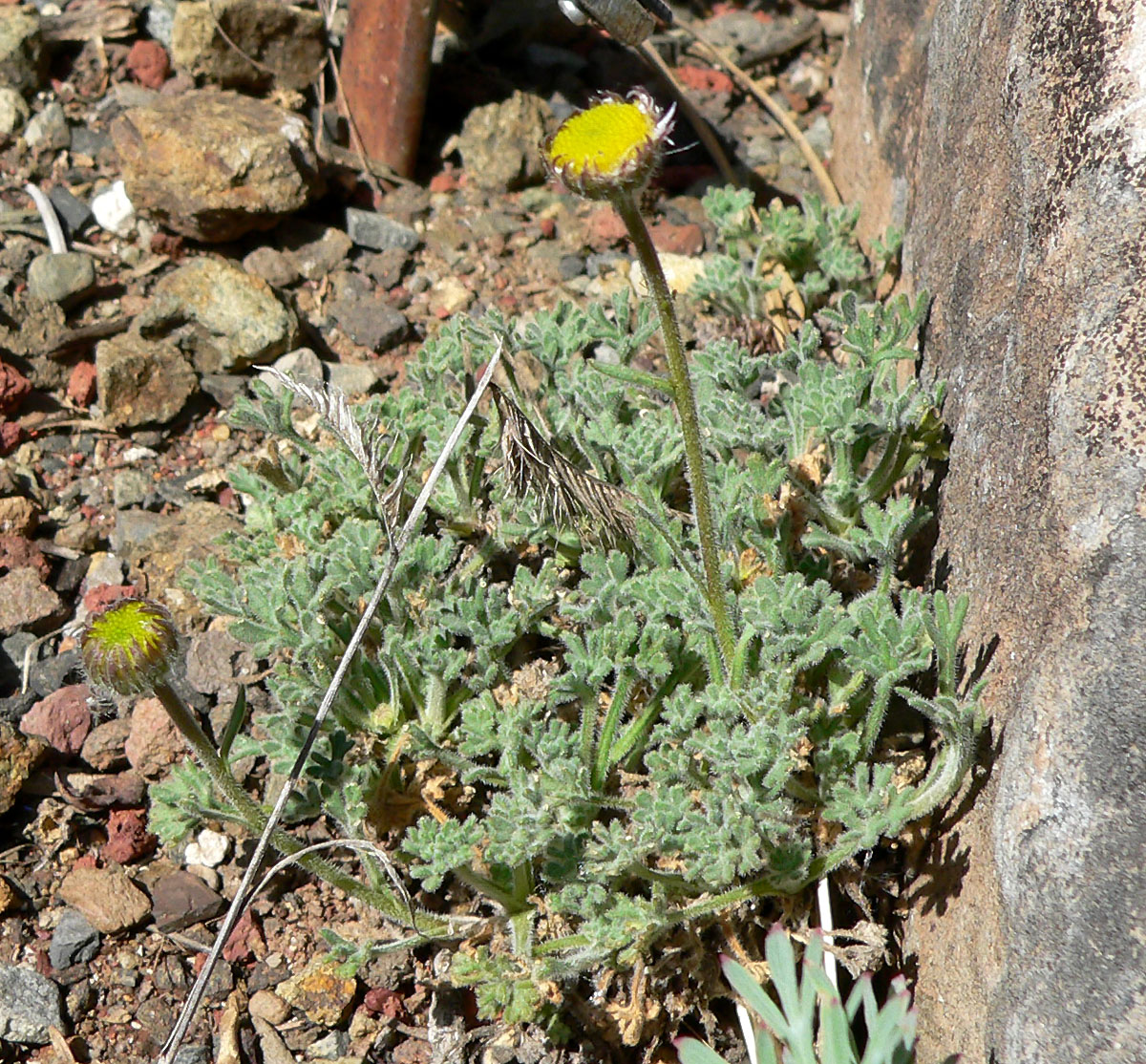

Conservation status
- Apparently Secure (NatureServe)

Scientific classification
- Kingdom: Plantae
- Clade: Tracheophytes
- Clade: Angiosperms
- Clade: Eudicots
- Clade: Asterids
- Order: Asterales
- Family: Asteraceae
- Genus: Erigeron
- Species: E. vagus

Binomial name
- Erigeron vagus Payson

= Erigeron vagus =

Species of flowering plant

Erigeron vagus is a high-elevation species of flowering plant in the family Asteraceae known by the common names rambling fleabane.

Erigeron vagus is native to the peaks of the western United States where it lives on talus slopes, sometimes above the tree line but other times in open coniferous forests. It has been found in several locations isolated from each other, in eastern California (Sierra Nevada and White Mountains), southern Utah, southern Colorado, northeastern Nevada (Elko County), and northeastern Oregon (Wallowa Mountains).

Erigeron vagus is a small perennial herb reaching a maximum height of about five centimeters (2 inches), forming a taproot and a branched underground caudex. Its stem and small patch of basal leaves are covered with glandular hairs. The inflorescence holds a single flower head per stem, each with hairy, purple-tipped phyllaries lining the underside of the head. Each head contains 25–40 white or pink ray florets surrounding many yellow disc florets.
