= Desert orange tip =

Desert orange tip or desert orangetip may refer to the following butterflies:

- Anthocharis cethura of the southwestern United States and northern Mexico
- Colotis evagore of Africa, southern Spain and southwest Arabia
- Colotis liagore of northern Africa and across to Pakistan
