= Rhammatophyllum pachyrhizum =

Scientific classification
- Kingdom: Plantae
- Clade: Tracheophytes
- Clade: Angiosperms
- Clade: Eudicots
- Clade: Rosids
- Order: Brassicales
- Family: Brassicaceae
- Genus: Rhammatophyllum
- Species: R. pachyrhizum

Binomial name
- Rhammatophyllum pachyrhizum O.E.Schulz

Synonyms
- Arabis pachyrhiza Karelin & Kirilov; Mitophyllum pachyrhizum (Karelin & Kirilov) O.E. Schulz; Rhammatophyllum krascheninnikovii A.N. Vassiljeva

Species of shrub

Rhammatophyllum pachyrhizum is a plant species native to Kazakhstan and Kyrgyzstan.

Rhammatophyllum pachyrhizum is a subshrub up to 30 cm (12 in) tall. Its leaves are narrow and thread-like, growing up to 7 cm (3 in) long, but only 0.5 (0.02 in) mm wide. Its flowers are creamy white.
