= Chilocardamum =

Scientific classification
- Kingdom: Plantae
- Clade: Tracheophytes
- Clade: Angiosperms
- Clade: Eudicots
- Clade: Rosids
- Order: Brassicales
- Family: Brassicaceae
- Tribe: Thelypodieae
- Genus: Chilocardamum; O.E.Schulz

Synonyms
- Dimitria Ravenna

Genus of plants

Chilocardamum is a small genus of four herbaceous cress-like species of plants in the family Brassicaceae, only found growing in Patagonia, southern Argentina.

== Taxonomy ==
It was first described in 1924 by the German botanist Otto Eugen Schulz. The first known species, Ch. patagonicum, was initially classified as a Sisymbrium by Carlo Luigi Spegazzini in 1897. The other three species were more recently moved to this genus from Sisymbrium by the Iraqi botanist Ihsan Ali Al-Shehbaz, when he resurrected the genus in 2006. Dimitria was a monotypic genus created by the Chilean botanist Pierfelice Ravenna to house Ch. onuridifolium in 1972; now considered a synonym of the genus Chilocardamum, it was already synonymised with Sisymbrium by the Argentine botanist M. C. Romanczuk in 1981.

== Description ==
Chilocardamum is quite similar in fruit and flower to Zuloagocardamum and Weberbauera. It is distinguished by having trichomes which are branched and dendritic, rarely with a few simple trichomes in the indumentum, the basal leaves are sessile and linear or awl-shaped, the stems are elongated and have cauline leaves, the inflorescence is an ebracteate raceme which is longer than the basal leaves, and seeds without mucilage. The fruit are non-curved, linear siliques which are not torulose.

== Distribution ==
The genus is endemic to southern Argentina.

== Species ==
As of 2017, the four species accepted in the Plants of the World Online database, and in the Flora del Conosur, are:

- Chilocardamum castellanosii (O.E.Schulz) Al-Shehbaz
- Chilocardamum longistylum (Romanczuk) Al-Shehbaz
- Chilocardamum onuridifolium (Ravenna) Al-Shehbaz
- Chilocardamum patagonicum (Speg.) O.E.Schulz
