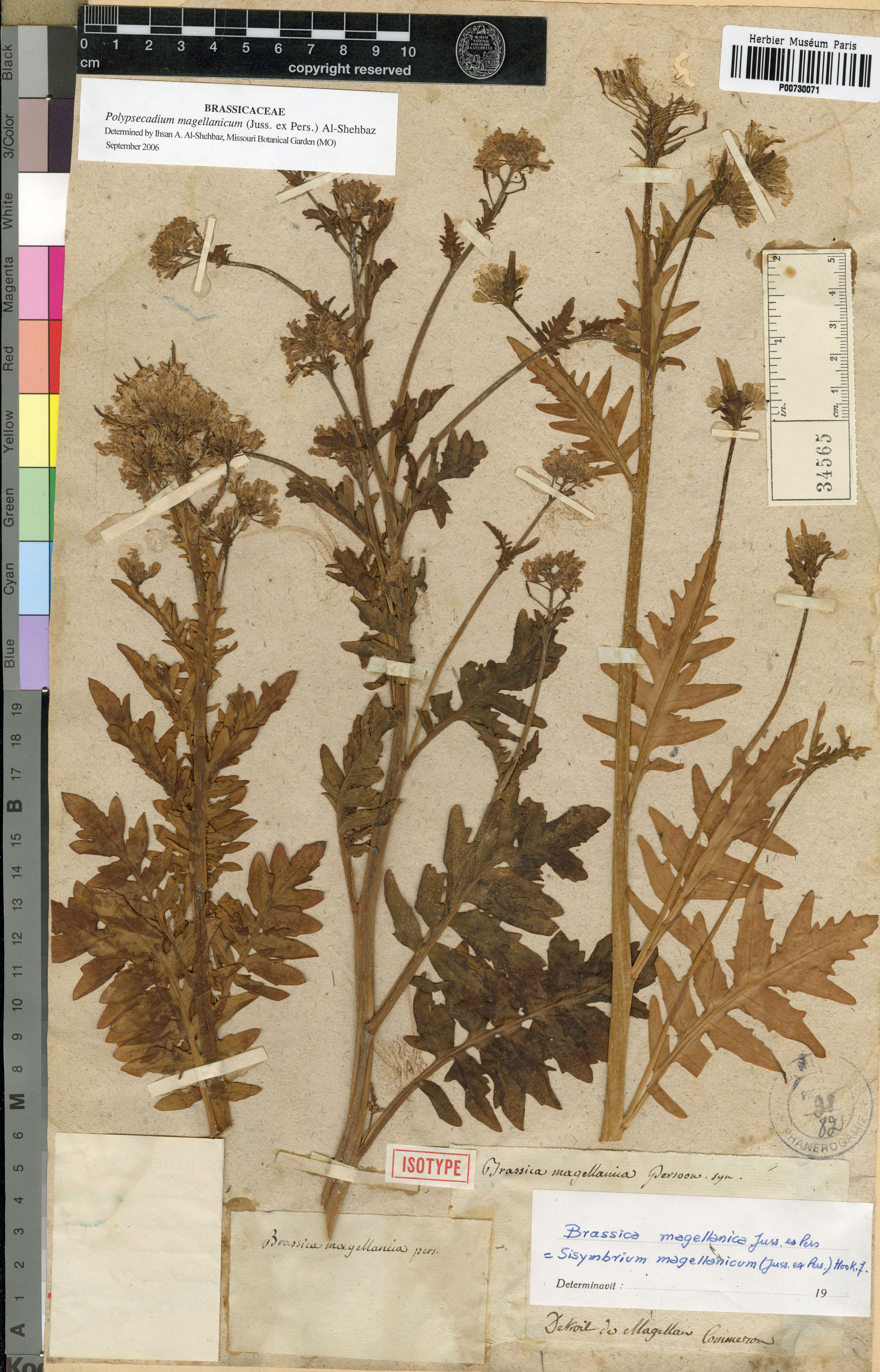
- Polypsecadium magellanicum - herbarium sheet with specimens collected near the Strait of Magellan, Chile

Scientific classification
- Kingdom: Plantae
- Clade: Tracheophytes
- Clade: Angiosperms
- Clade: Eudicots
- Clade: Rosids
- Order: Brassicales
- Family: Brassicaceae
- Tribe: Schizopetaleae
- Genus: Polypsecadium; O.E.Schulz

= Polypsecadium =

Genus of plants

Polypsecadium is a genus of large herbaceous species of plants in the family Brassicaceae, found growing in South America. Most of the species were formerly classified in the genus Sisymbrium.

== Taxonomy ==
Polypsecadium was first created in 1924 by the German botanist Otto Eugen Schulz to house P. harmsianum (the type species), which had earlier been described as a new species of Thelypodium in 1908. Schulz described a number of other related species in other genera. The genus remained monotypic until 1982, when the Argentine botanists M. C. Romanczuk and Osvaldo Boelcke added two new species. In their 2003 general work on Brassicaceae (Cruciferae) in the book series The families and genera of vascular plants, O. Appel and the Iraqi botanist Ihsan Ali Al-Shehbaz continued to recognise three species in the genus, but by this time, in the beginning of the 2000s, phylogenetic trees produced by molecular studies of the DNA were challenging the circumscription of the traditional genera -in other words, the traditional morphological characteristics were proving unreliable in delimiting monophyletic genera. One of these genera was Sisymbrium, which consisted of some 90 species from the end of the 1980s to the early 2000s, a large proportion of these from South America. The North American species of Sisymbrium had already been moved to new genera in 1976 by Rollins, except one (the wrong one, it later turned out). In 2006 Al-Shehbaz moved almost all of the South American representatives of the genus Sisymbrium to either new or existing genera, and in doing so increased the genus Polypsecadium to fourteen species. The last Sisymbrium species from the Americas (one still remains in North America) were moved by Al-Shehbaz in 2012.

In 2007 one of Romanczuk and Boelcke's two species, P. burkartii, was removed to the new genus Exhalimolobos by Bailey et al. (Al-Shehbaz foreshadowed this the year earlier, by not listing the species among the fourteen). P. apolobamba was described as a new species from Bolivia in 2008, increasing the number of species to fifteen, at which it remains as of 2017.

=== Etymology ===
Schulz derived the name Polypsecadium from Ancient Greek, combining πολύς, meaning 'many', and ψεχάδιον, with which he meant 'tiny grains'; Schulz referred to the numerous seeds of the plant with this generic epithet.

=== Systematics ===
Schulz classified the genus in the tribe Sisymbrieae in 1924. In 2002 and 2006 DNA molecular studies published by Warwick et al. found all of the South American species of Sisymbrium did not belong to Sisymbrium, but in fact belonged within the tribe Thelypodieae as it was understood at the time. Warwick and Al-Shehbaz classified the group as an informal 'Thelypodieae alliance' in 2003 and Al-Shehbaz et al. formalised this group at the tribal rank in 2006, but in 2006 Al-Shehbaz reclassified the group as the tribe Schizopetaleae, of which he considered Thelypodieae a synonym at the time. Subsequent molecular by Warwick et al. in 2009 and 2010 found Schizopetaleae to be polyphyletic.

== Description ==
In the dichotomous key provided by Al-Shehbaz in 2006, Polypsecadium is distinguished from the other South American Schizopetaleae by virtue of its seeds being biseriate (in two rows in the silique) or sub-biseriate (in the case of P. brasiliense), the stigma is retained in the mature fruit and is much wider than style (except in P. litorale and P. llatasii), and the cauline leaves have longish petioles of some 1-7cm long. The newest species P. apolobamba has uniseriate seeds.

Polypsecadium is difficult to clearly distinguish morphologically from its former congeners in the genus Sisymbrium.

Polypsecadium are almost all large herbaceous plants 1-8m tall, although some individuals of P. arnottianum and P. magellanicum can become much shorter. It has no trichomes or simple trichomes, rarely having stalked and 2-4-rayed trichomes as part of its indumentum. The stems are erect or ascending, and can be branched in their higher parts, in some species it is highly branched. The species in the genus have no basal leaves, but they have cauline leaves with longish petioles. The leaves are roughly dentate to pinnately lobed. The inflorescence is an ebracteate, corymbose, lax (not stiffly erect) raceme with many flowers which elongates considerably when in fruit. The flowers are coloured white to lavender or purple. The pedicels of the fruit are slender, bend upwards, divaricate, and are strongly recurved or reflexed. The sepals are free (not connected to one another), deciduous (falling off as the flower ages), subequal and with a margin which is not membranous. The petals are obovate to spatulate shaped, with a blunt apex. The petals have a distinct, glabrous claw. The flowers have six, erect, slightly tetradynamous stamens with free, glabrous filaments which are dilated at base. The anthers are linear or linear-oblong. The nectar pools together; the nectar glands subtend the bases of the stamens, or in rare cases are lateral and tooth-like. There are (22-)40-200(-240) ovules in each ovary. The fruit of Brassicaceae are known as 'siliques', in this genus they are dehiscent (splitting open when dry), non-curved, linear, terete and unsegmented. The glabrous or in rare cases sparsely pubescent siliques have two valves, these have one prominent vein down their middle, and either obscure to distinct lateral veins departing from that, and are smooth or in rare cases torulose. The replum of the silique is rounded; the septum is complete, and is without visible veins. The style, when it is more or less distinct as in some species, is up to 5mm long. The stigma is usually much wider than style. The stigma has a 'head', which is shaped as either a simple knob or has two lobes. The seeds have no wings, or are rarely winged at the distal end, and are plump, shaped oblong to ovoid, and when made wet do not become sticky with mucilage. The cotyledons are incumbent.

The genus is relatively diverse. Most species are perennials, but P. llatasii is an annual. Most species are herbaceous, but many species possess a woody main stem, and two have woody branches and become shrubs: P. effusum and P. solidagineum. P. adscendens, from high elevations in the Andes Mountains of Boyacá in Colombia and Pichincha in Ecuador, is perhaps the most odd: it is poorly known, having only been collected a handful of times since its discovery approximately a century ago, but it appears to be a cruciferous vine, scrambling up trees to some five to nine meters from the ground.

== Distribution ==
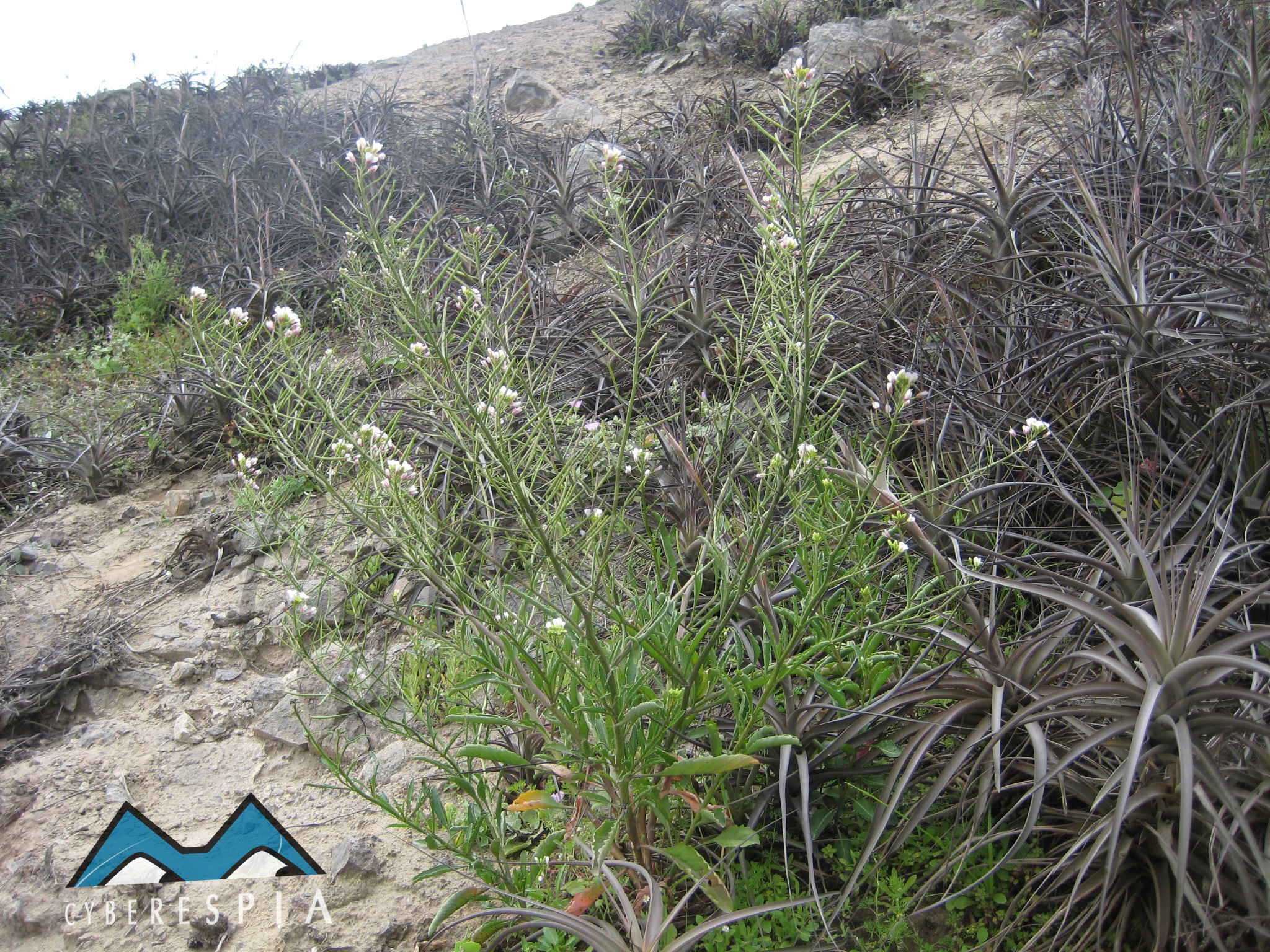
Polypsecadium llatasii growing in between Tillandsia

It has been found in the countries of Argentina, Bolivia, Brazil, Chile, Colombia, Ecuador and Peru. The Plants of the World Online website claims it is native to Venezuela, this is a mistake based on a formerly misidentified specimen of P. solidagineum by Pittier et al. from 1945, the specimen in question was later determined to be either Mostacillastrum pandurifolium or Exhalimolobos hispidulus. Argentina appears to have the most biodiversity in this genus at this time.

== Species ==
As of 2025, the fifteen species accepted in the Plants of the World Online database, as well as the BrassiBase project of the Heidelberg University as of 2010, are:

- Polypsecadium adscendens (O.E.Schulz) Al-Shehbaz
- Polypsecadium apolobamba Al-Shehbaz & A.Fuentes
- Polypsecadium arnottianum (Gillies ex Hook.) Al-Shehbaz
- Polypsecadium brasiliense (O.E.Schulz) Al-Shehbaz
- Polypsecadium effusum (O.E.Schulz) Al-Shehbaz
- Polypsecadium gilliesii (Romanczuk) Al-Shehbaz
- Polypsecadium grandiflorum Romanczuk & Boelcke
- Polypsecadium harmsianum (Muschl.) O.E.Schulz
- Polypsecadium litorale (Phil.) Al-Shehbaz
- Polypsecadium llatasii (Al-Shehbaz) Al-Shehbaz
- Polypsecadium magellanicum (Juss. ex Pers.) Al-Shehbaz
- Polypsecadium rusbyi (Britton) Al-Shehbaz
- Polypsecadium solidagineum (Triana & Planch.) Al-Shehbaz
- Polypsecadium tucumanense (O.E.Schulz) Al-Shehbaz
- Polypsecadium zoellneri Al-Shehbaz
