= Pycnoplinthus =

Scientific classification
- Kingdom: Plantae
- Clade: Tracheophytes
- Clade: Angiosperms
- Clade: Eudicots
- Clade: Rosids
- Order: Brassicales
- Family: Brassicaceae
- Genus: Pycnoplinthus; O.E.Schulz
- Species: P. uniflora

Binomial name
- Pycnoplinthus uniflora (Hook.f. & Thomson) O.E.Schulz

Synonyms
- Braya uniflora Hook.f. & Thomson; Hesperis uniflora (Hook.f. & Thomson) Kuntze; Sisymbrium uniflorum (Hook.f. & Thomson) E.Fourn.

Genus of plants

Pycnoplinthus is a genus of flowering plants belonging to the family Brassicaceae. It includes a single species, Pycnoplinthus uniflora, a perennial native to subalpine areas of the western Himalaya.
