= Arcyosperma =

Scientific classification
- Kingdom: Plantae
- Clade: Tracheophytes
- Clade: Angiosperms
- Clade: Eudicots
- Clade: Rosids
- Order: Brassicales
- Family: Brassicaceae
- Genus: Arcyosperma; O.E.Schulz
- Species: A. primulifolium

Binomial name
- Arcyosperma primulifolium (Thomson) O.E.Schulz

Synonyms
- Eutrema primulifolium (Thomson) Hook.f. & Thomson; Sisymbrium primulifolium Thomson

Genus of flowering plants

Arcyosperma is a genus of flowering plants belonging to the family Brassicaceae. It includes a single species, Arcyosperma primulifolium, a perennial native to northern Pakistan and the Himalayas.

The species was first described as Sisymbrium primulifolium by Thomas Thomson in 1853. In 1924 Otto Eugen Schulz placed the species in the new monotypic genus Arcyosperma as Arcyosperma primulifolium.
