= Weberbauera =

Scientific classification
- Kingdom: Plantae
- Clade: Tracheophytes
- Clade: Angiosperms
- Clade: Eudicots
- Clade: Rosids
- Order: Brassicales
- Family: Brassicaceae
- Tribe: Thelypodieae
- Genus: Weberbauera; Gilg & Muschl.

Species
- See text

Synonyms
- Alpaminia O.E.Schulz; Catadysia O.E.Schulz; Pelagatia O.E.Schulz; Stenodraba O.E.Schulz

Genus of plants in the crucifer family

Weberbauera is a genus of flowering plants in the crucifer family Brassicaceae, native to the central Andes; Peru, Chile, Bolivia, and Argentina.

The genus has simple or branched trichomes, basal leaves with petioles which are linear to oblanceolate or oblong, relatively elongated stems with or without cauline leaves, inflorescences which are ebracteate or basally bracteate racemes which are longer than basal leaves, and seeds without mucilage. The fruit are curved or straight siliques which are torulose or not.

It is quite similar in fruit and flower to Zuloagocardamum and Chilocardamum.

== Species ==
Currently accepted species include:

- Weberbauera arequipa Al-Shehbaz & Montesinos
- Weberbauera ayacuchoensis Al-Shehbaz, A.Cano & Trinidad
- Weberbauera bracteata (O.E.Schulz) J.F.Macbr.
- Weberbauera chillanensis (Phil.) Al-Shehbaz
- Weberbauera colchaguensis (Barnéoud) Al-Shehbaz
- Weberbauera cymosa Al-Shehbaz
- Weberbauera densifolia Al-Shehbaz
- Weberbauera dillonii Al-Shehbaz
- Weberbauera herzogii (O.E.Schulz) Al-Shehbaz
- Weberbauera imbricatifolia (Barnéoud) Al-Shehbaz
- Weberbauera incisa Al-Shehbaz, P. Gonzáles & A. Cano
- Weberbauera lagunae (O.E.Schulz) Al-Shehbaz
- Weberbauera minutipila Al-Shehbaz
- Weberbauera orophila (Wedd.) Salariato &. Al-Shehbaz
- Weberbauera perforata Al-Shehbaz
- Weberbauera peruviana (DC.) Al-Shehbaz
- Weberbauera retropila Al-Shehbaz
- Weberbauera rosulans (O.E.Schulz) Al-Shehbaz
- Weberbauera scabrifolia Al-Shehbaz
- Weberbauera smithii Al-Shehbaz
- Weberbauera spathulifolia (A.Gray) O.E.Schulz
- Weberbauera stenophylla (Leyb.) Al-Shehbaz
- Weberbauera suffruticosa (Barnéoud) Al-Shehbaz
- Weberbauera trichocarpa (Muschl.) J.F.Macbr.
- Weberbauera violacea Al-Shehbaz
