= Terraria haydenii =

Conservation status
- Critically Imperiled (NatureServe)

Scientific classification
- Kingdom: Plantae
- Clade: Tracheophytes
- Clade: Angiosperms
- Clade: Eudicots
- Clade: Rosids
- Order: Brassicales
- Family: Brassicaceae
- Tribe: Thelypodieae
- Genus: Terraria; T.J.Hildebr. & Al-Shehbaz
- Species: T. haydenii

Binomial name
- Terraria haydenii T.J.Hildebr. & Al-Shehbaz

Species of flowering plant

Terraria haydenii, commonly known as Frisco Mountains mustard, is a species of flowering plant in the family Brassicaceae, and the sole species in genus Terraria. It is a subshrub endemic to Utah.

The species was discovered in 2012, and formally published in 2017. It is known only from two small populations in Wah Wah Mountains in the Great Basin. It grows in dry, highly alkaline soils. The populations are on land owned by the Bureau of Land Management, and are separated from each other by a road. The species is threatened with habitat loss from mineral extractions, recreational rock collecting for spider marble, and soil disturbance from livestock grazing.
