= Thelypodium eucosmum =

Conservation status
- Imperiled (NatureServe)

Scientific classification
- Kingdom: Plantae
- Clade: Tracheophytes
- Clade: Angiosperms
- Clade: Eudicots
- Clade: Rosids
- Order: Brassicales
- Family: Brassicaceae
- Genus: Thelypodium
- Species: T. eucosmum

Binomial name
- Thelypodium eucosmum B.L.Rob.

Species of flowering plant

Thelypodium eucosmum is a species of flowering plant in the mustard family known by the common names arrow-leaf thelypody and world thelypody. It is endemic to Oregon in the United States, where it is known from Grant and Wheeler Counties. There are also historical records of the plant from Baker County.

This species is a biennial or short-lived perennial herb. It produces an erect, branching stem which can reach a meter in height. The basal leaves are lance-shaped or sometimes oval in shape and are borne on a short petiole. The leaves higher on the stem are smaller and have no petiole. They may clasp the stem or may be arrowhead-shaped, with projections extending around the stem. The inflorescence is a raceme of many flowers with purple petals. The fruit is a silique up to 6.5 centimeters long.

This species occurs in the Blue Mountains of Oregon, and along tributaries of the John Day River. Its habitat is dominated by sagebrush and juniper. It grows in moist areas such as river canyons and streambanks. The plant's population size is greatly affected by the availability of water. Other plants in the habitat may include Balsamorhiza spp., Bromus mollis, B. tectorum, Ericameria nauseosa, Gutierrezia sarothrae, Hordeum murinum, Lepidium spp., Purshia tridentata, Salix spp., Sarcobatus vermiculatus, and Urtica dioica.

Grazing is a main threat to the species; some populations have been extirpated by livestock grazing.
