= Thelypodium laxiflorum =

Conservation status
- Apparently Secure (NatureServe)

Scientific classification
- Kingdom: Plantae
- Clade: Tracheophytes
- Clade: Angiosperms
- Clade: Eudicots
- Clade: Rosids
- Order: Brassicales
- Family: Brassicaceae
- Genus: Thelypodium
- Species: T. laxiflorum

Binomial name
- Thelypodium laxiflorum Al-Shehbaz

Synonyms
- Stanleyella wrightii var. tenella (M.E. Jones) Payson; Thelypodium wrightii var. tenellum M.E. Jones

Species of flowering plant

Thelypodium laxiflorum, the droopflower thelypody, is a plant species native to the southwestern United States. It grows in open, rocky places on slopes and cliff faces, usually in pinyon-juniper woodlands at elevations of 4,900–10,200 feet (1,500–3,100 m). It has been reported from Utah, western Colorado, southern Nevada, northwestern Arizona, and northwestern New Mexico.

Thelypodium laxiflorum is a glabrous perennial. Stems are up to 55 inches (140 cm) tall, branching well above ground. It has both basal and cauline (stem) leaves. Flowers are white, rarely lavender, born in cymes. Fruits are long and narrow, visibly constricted between the seeds.
