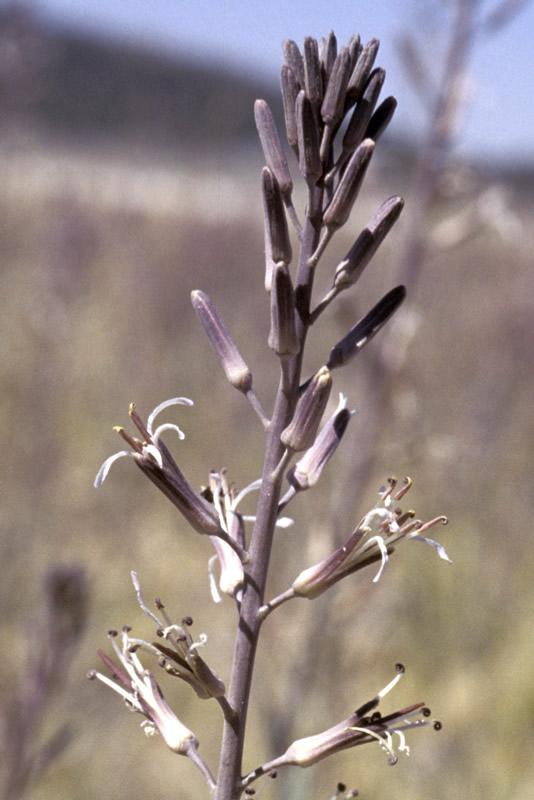

Conservation status
- Critically Imperiled (NatureServe)

Scientific classification
- Kingdom: Plantae
- Clade: Tracheophytes
- Clade: Angiosperms
- Clade: Eudicots
- Clade: Rosids
- Order: Brassicales
- Family: Brassicaceae
- Genus: Thelypodium
- Species: T. stenopetalum

Binomial name
- Thelypodium stenopetalum S.Watson

= Thelypodium stenopetalum =

Species of flowering plant

Thelypodium stenopetalum is a rare species of flowering plant in the mustard family known by the common names slenderpetal thelypody, slender-petaled thelypodium and slender-petaled mustard. It is endemic to the San Bernardino Mountains of southern California, where it is known from only three or four extant occurrences in moist mountain meadows near Big Bear Lake. Its remaining habitat is considered seriously threatened and the plant is a federally listed endangered species in the United States.

== Description ==
Thelypodium stenopetalum is a biennial herb producing decumbent stems up to about 80 centimeters long. The branching stems are hairless, waxy in texture, and greenish to purple in color. The basal leaves have thick, oblong to lance-shaped blades up to 15 centimeters long with smooth or rippled edges. Leaves higher on the plant have much smaller blades which may clasp the stem at their bases.

The inflorescence is an erect, open raceme of widely spaced flowers. The petals are usually lavender, or occasionally white, and are narrow and linear in shape, sometimes crinkled. The fruit is a narrow, cylindrical silique up to 5 centimeters long.

== Habitat ==
This plant is threatened by the destruction of its very limited mountain meadow habitat, which is being claimed for development and degraded by recreation, grazing, and introduced weedy plants. Changes in hydrology and soil quality impact the plant. Much of its historical habitat is thought to have disappeared when the Big Bear Dam was built over a century ago, expanding Big Bear Lake by flooding adjacent land.

Thelypodium stenopetalum can sometimes be found growing near pebble plain habitat, which contains several other rare plant species.

This mustard is a food plant for the larva of the rare endemic Andrew's marble butterfly (Euchloe hyantis andrewsi).
