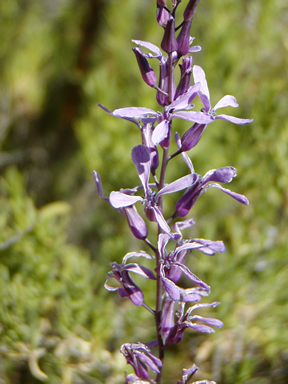
- Thelypodium howellii spectabilis

Conservation status
- Critically Imperiled (NatureServe)

Scientific classification
- Kingdom: Plantae
- Clade: Tracheophytes
- Clade: Angiosperms
- Clade: Eudicots
- Clade: Rosids
- Order: Brassicales
- Family: Brassicaceae
- Genus: Thelypodium
- Species: T. howellii

Binomial name
- Thelypodium howellii S. Wats.

= Thelypodium howellii =

Species of flowering plant

Thelypodium howellii, the Howell's thelypody or Howell's thelypodium, is a rare plant of the Western United States. It is endemic to a relatively small area on the borders of three western States: Oregon, Nevada, and California.

== Description ==
The Thelypodium howellii plant is biennial. It is often somewhat hairy, especially near the base, but may be hairless and waxy in texture. It produces a slender, branching, erect stem up to 70 centimeters tall. The leaves are mostly located in a rosette around the base. Leaves located higher on the stem may have clasping bases.

The inflorescence is a raceme of widely spaced flowers with greenish white or purplish sepals and pale blue or purple, spoon-shaped petals. The fruit is a silique up to 4.5 centimeters long containing plump brown seeds.

=== Subspecies ===
- Thelypodium howellii subsp. howellii
- Thelypodium howellii subsp. spectabalis - Howell's spectacular thelypody.

== Distribution, habitat, and ecology ==
This plant is endemic to a small area stretching from north-eastern Oregon to north-eastern California. It lives in alkaline or adobe meadows and seeps, river valleys and moist plains in Great Basin sagebrush scrub. The fire ecology of this plant is not known at present.

== Conservation status and threats ==
U.S. Forest Service Pacific Southwest Region Sensitive Species.

California Native Plant Society List 1B.2.

NatureServe California State Rank: S2.2; Global Rank: G2

Oregon Department of Fish and Wildlife Endangered.

The Oregon Department of Fish and Wildlife's Conservation Strategy website reports that a large portion of this species' habitat has been converted to agricultural land, and its numbers are being limited by competition with invasive weeds, changes in hydrology, pressure from cattle grazing, and mowing in preparation for growing season.

== Field identification ==
Howell's thelypody flowers from May to July. Var. spectabilis, known only from Malheur Co., Oregon, is larger than var. howellii, has larger, more strongly purple flowers, and is a federally listed species.
