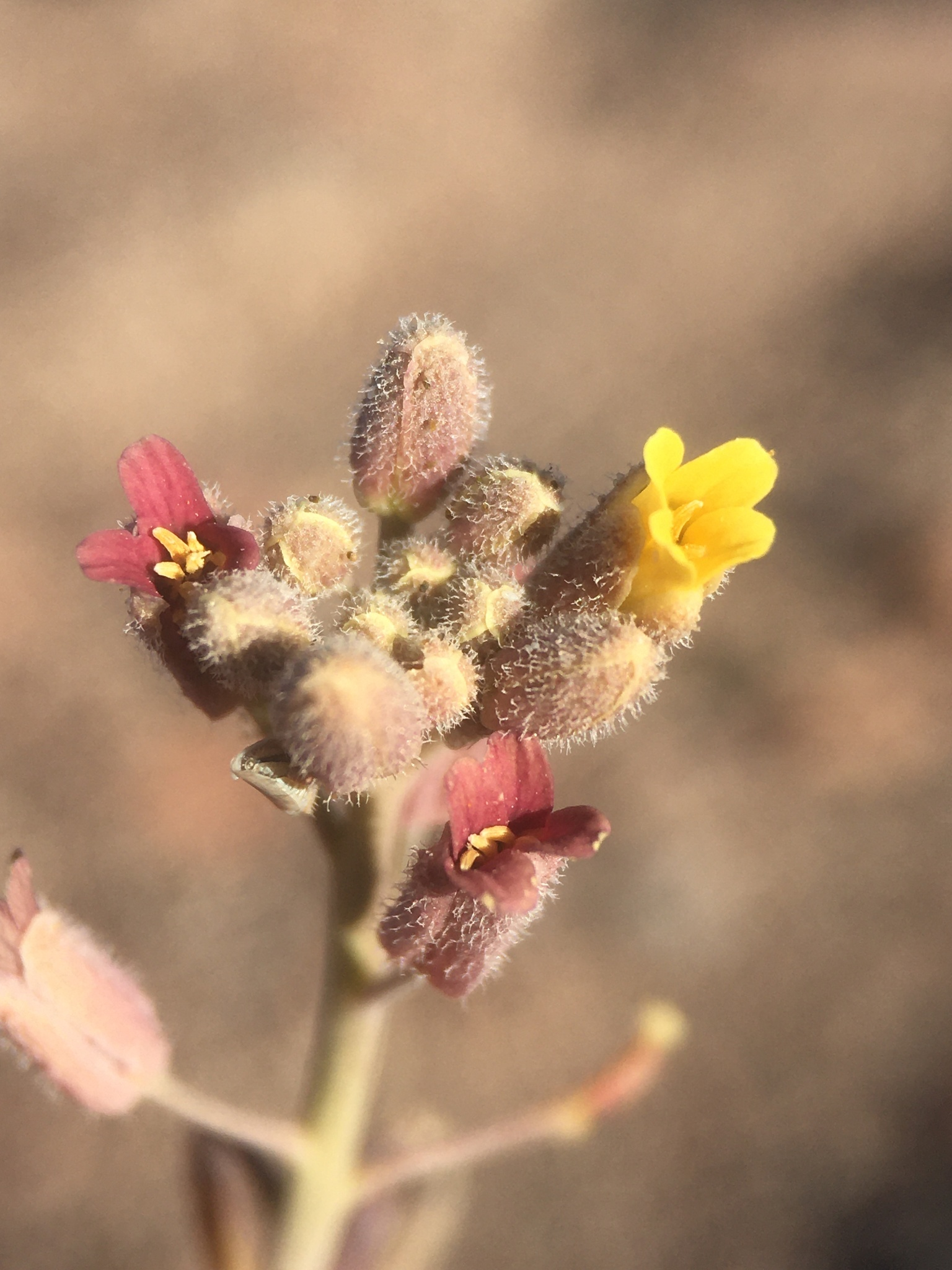
- Neuontobotrys tarapacanus

Scientific classification
- Kingdom: Plantae
- Clade: Tracheophytes
- Clade: Angiosperms
- Clade: Eudicots
- Clade: Rosids
- Order: Brassicales
- Family: Brassicaceae
- Genus: Neuontobotrys; O.E.Schulz

= Neuontobotrys =

Genus of plants

Neuontobotrys is a genus of flowering plants belonging to the family Brassicaceae.

Its native range is Peru to Southern South America.

Species:

- Neuontobotrys amplexicaulis (Kuntze) Al-Shehbaz
- Neuontobotrys berningeri O.E.Schulz
- Neuontobotrys camanaensis Al-Shehbaz & A.Cano
- Neuontobotrys choiquensis (Romanczuk) Al-Shehbaz
- Neuontobotrys elloanensis Al-Shehbaz
- Neuontobotrys frutescens (Gillies ex Hook.) Al-Shehbaz
- Neuontobotrys intricatissimus (Phil.) Al-Shehbaz
- Neuontobotrys lanatus (Walp.) Al-Shehbaz
- Neuontobotrys linearifolius (Kuntze) Al-Shehbaz
- Neuontobotrys mendocinus (Romanczuk) Al-Shehbaz
- Neuontobotrys polyphyllus (Phil.) Al-Shehbaz
- Neuontobotrys robustus (Chodat & Wilczek) Al-Shehbaz
- Neuontobotrys schulzii (Al-Shehbaz) Al-Shehbaz
- Neuontobotrys tarapacanus (Phil.) Al-Shehbaz
