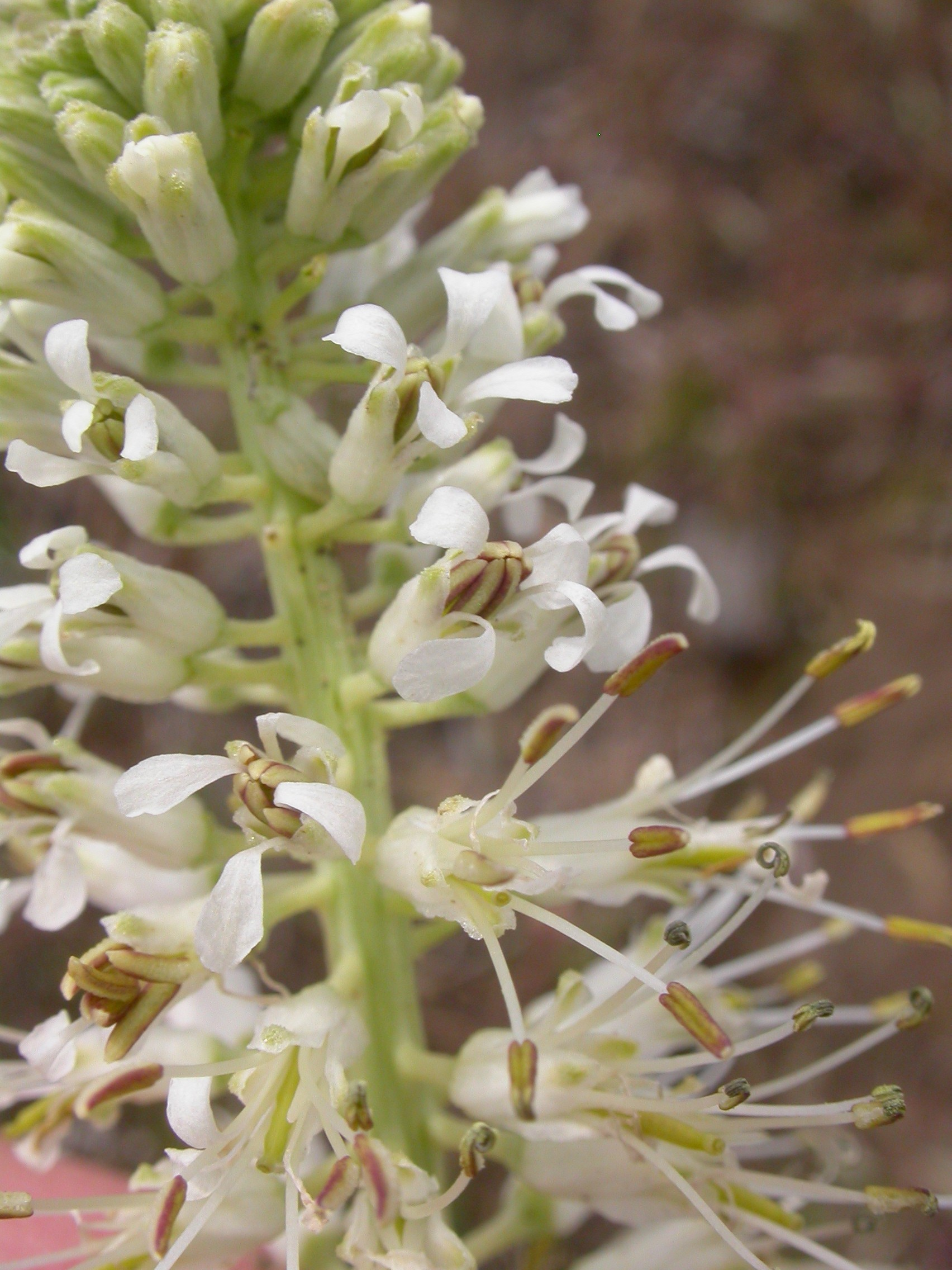

Scientific classification
- Kingdom: Plantae
- Clade: Tracheophytes
- Clade: Angiosperms
- Clade: Eudicots
- Clade: Rosids
- Order: Brassicales
- Family: Brassicaceae
- Genus: Thelypodium
- Species: T. milleflorum

Binomial name
- Thelypodium milleflorum A.Nelson

= Thelypodium milleflorum =

Species of flowering plant

Thelypodium milleflorum is a species of flowering plant in the mustard family known by the common names manyflower thelypody and many-flowered thelypodium. It is native to western North America, particularly the Great Basin and surrounding plateau, desert, and foothill habitat, where it grows in sagebrush and scrub.

== Description ==
Thelypodium milleflorum is a biennial herb producing many erect stems, often approaching two meters in height. The stems are hairless, sometimes hollow and inflated, and often waxy in texture. The basal leaves have oblong to lance-shaped blades with toothed edges, and sometimes divided into segments.

The large inflorescence is a dense, spikelike raceme of mustardlike flowers with white petals. The fruit is a narrow, flat silique up to 8 to 10 centimeters long.
