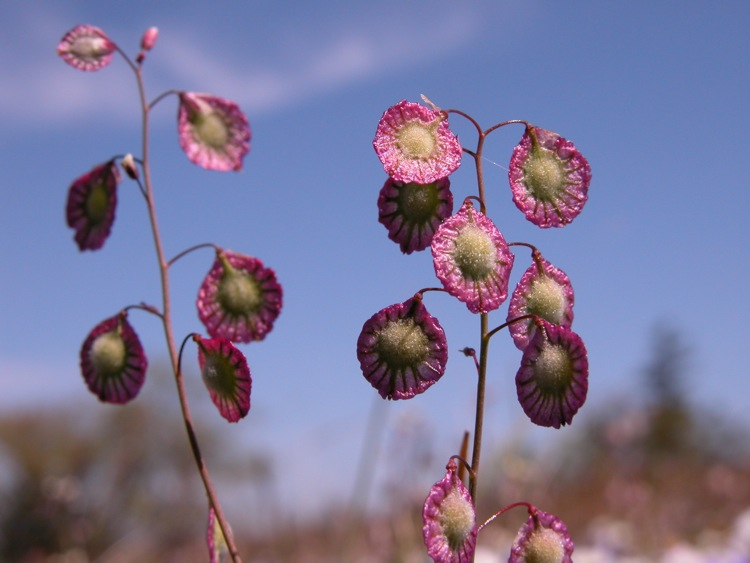

Scientific classification
- Kingdom: Plantae
- Clade: Tracheophytes
- Clade: Angiosperms
- Clade: Eudicots
- Clade: Rosids
- Order: Brassicales
- Family: Brassicaceae
- Genus: Thysanocarpus
- Species: T. radians

Binomial name
- Thysanocarpus radians Benth.

= Thysanocarpus radians =

Species of flowering plant

Thysanocarpus radians is a species of flowering plant in the family Brassicaceae known by the common name ribbed fringepod. The plant is also colloquially known as spokepod because of its seedpods’ characteristic resemblance to tire spokes. It is native to northern and central California and Oregon, where it grows in moist meadows, fields, hillsides, and other habitat. It is an annual herb growing up to 50 or 60 centimeters tall. The leaves are wavy-edged or lobed, the basal ones up to 5 centimeters long and ephemeral, and the upper ones with bases clasping the stem. The inflorescence is a long, open raceme of small whitish or purplish flowers. The fruit is a flattened, rounded, disclike capsule which hangs from its pedicel. It measures up to a centimeter long and is hairless to quite hairy in texture. The flat wing lining the edge of the disc is ribbed with rays like the spokes of a wheel, a characteristic making it easily distinguished from other Thysanocarpus when it is in fruit.
