= Phlebolobium =

Conservation status
- Endangered (IUCN 3.1)

Scientific classification
- Kingdom: Plantae
- Clade: Tracheophytes
- Clade: Angiosperms
- Clade: Eudicots
- Clade: Rosids
- Order: Brassicales
- Family: Brassicaceae
- Genus: Phlebolobium; O. E. Schulz
- Species: P. maclovianum

Binomial name
- Phlebolobium maclovianum (d'Urv.) O. E. Schulz

Genus of flowering plants

Phlebolobium maclovianum, known as Falkland rock-cress, is a species of flowering plant in the family Brassicaceae. It is endemic to the Falkland Islands, and is the only species in the genus Phlebolobium.
