= Planodes (plant) =

Scientific classification
- Kingdom: Plantae
- Clade: Tracheophytes
- Clade: Angiosperms
- Clade: Eudicots
- Clade: Rosids
- Order: Brassicales
- Family: Brassicaceae
- Genus: Planodes; Greene

Genus of plants

Planodes is a genus of flowering plants belonging to the family Brassicaceae.

The native range is the Southern United States of America and Mexico.

Species:

- Planodes mexicanum (S.Watson) Al-Shehbaz
- Planodes virginicum (L.) Greene
