= Dictyophragmus =

Scientific classification
- Kingdom: Plantae
- Clade: Tracheophytes
- Clade: Angiosperms
- Clade: Eudicots
- Clade: Rosids
- Order: Brassicales
- Family: Brassicaceae
- Genus: Dictyophragmus; O.E.Schulz

Genus of plants

Dictyophragmus is a genus of flowering plants belonging to the family Brassicaceae.

Its native range is Peru to Argentina.

Species:

- Dictyophragmus englerianus (Muschl.) O.E.Schulz
- Dictyophragmus lactucoides (Förther & Weigend) Al-Shehbaz
- Dictyophragmus punensis (Romanczuk) I.A.Al-Shehbaz
