= Zuloagocardamum =

Scientific classification
- Kingdom: Plantae
- Clade: Tracheophytes
- Clade: Angiosperms
- Clade: Eudicots
- Clade: Rosids
- Order: Brassicales
- Family: Brassicaceae
- Tribe: Thelypodieae
- Genus: Zuloagocardamum; Salariato & Al-Shehbaz
- Species: Z. jujuyensis

Binomial name
- Zuloagocardamum jujuyensis Salariato & Al-Shehbaz

Species of flowering plant

Zuloagocardamum jujuyensis is a very rare, dwarf species of caudiciform cress-like plant in the family Brassicaceae which was first described in 2014. It is endemic to mountains in Jujuy Province in northern Argentina, where it is only known to grow on the grounds of El Aguilar mine at 3,700 meters in elevation. It is only known from a single recent collection. It is the only species in the new genus Zuloagocardamum, a monotypic genus. It is quite similar in fruit and flower to Chilocardamum and Weberbauera, but the taxonomists describing the species decided it was sufficiently distinguished by dint of its well-developed, woody caudex, and extremely reduced, leafless branches bearing small rosulate tufts of linear leaves, and sticky, mucilaginous seeds.

It is a perennial. The caudex measures 8mm across.

The genus was named after Fernando O. Zuloaga, the director of the Instituto de Botánica Darwinion, an agrostologist (a grass specialist) who both first discovered the plants and collected the only specimens of this new genus.
