= Thelypodium crispum =

Scientific classification
- Kingdom: Plantae
- Clade: Tracheophytes
- Clade: Angiosperms
- Clade: Eudicots
- Clade: Rosids
- Order: Brassicales
- Family: Brassicaceae
- Genus: Thelypodium
- Species: T. crispum

Binomial name
- Thelypodium crispum Greene ex Payson

Species of flowering plant

Thelypodium crispum is a species of flowering plant in the mustard family known by the common name crisped thelypody.

It is native to the mountains and plateaus of Nevada and eastern California, where it grows in areas with mineral-rich and alkaline soils, such as the margins of hot springs.

Thelypodium crispum is an annual, biennial, or short-lived perennial herb producing an erect, branching stem to a maximum height anywhere between 10 centimeters and 1.2 meters. The thick, waxy basal leaves are usually divided into lobes, and leaves higher on the plant are usually simple and have bases that clasp the stem. The inflorescence is a dense, spikelike raceme of many white, greenish, or lavender flowers with very crinkly petals. The fruit is a cylindrical silique 1 to 2.5 centimeters long with several seeds inside.
