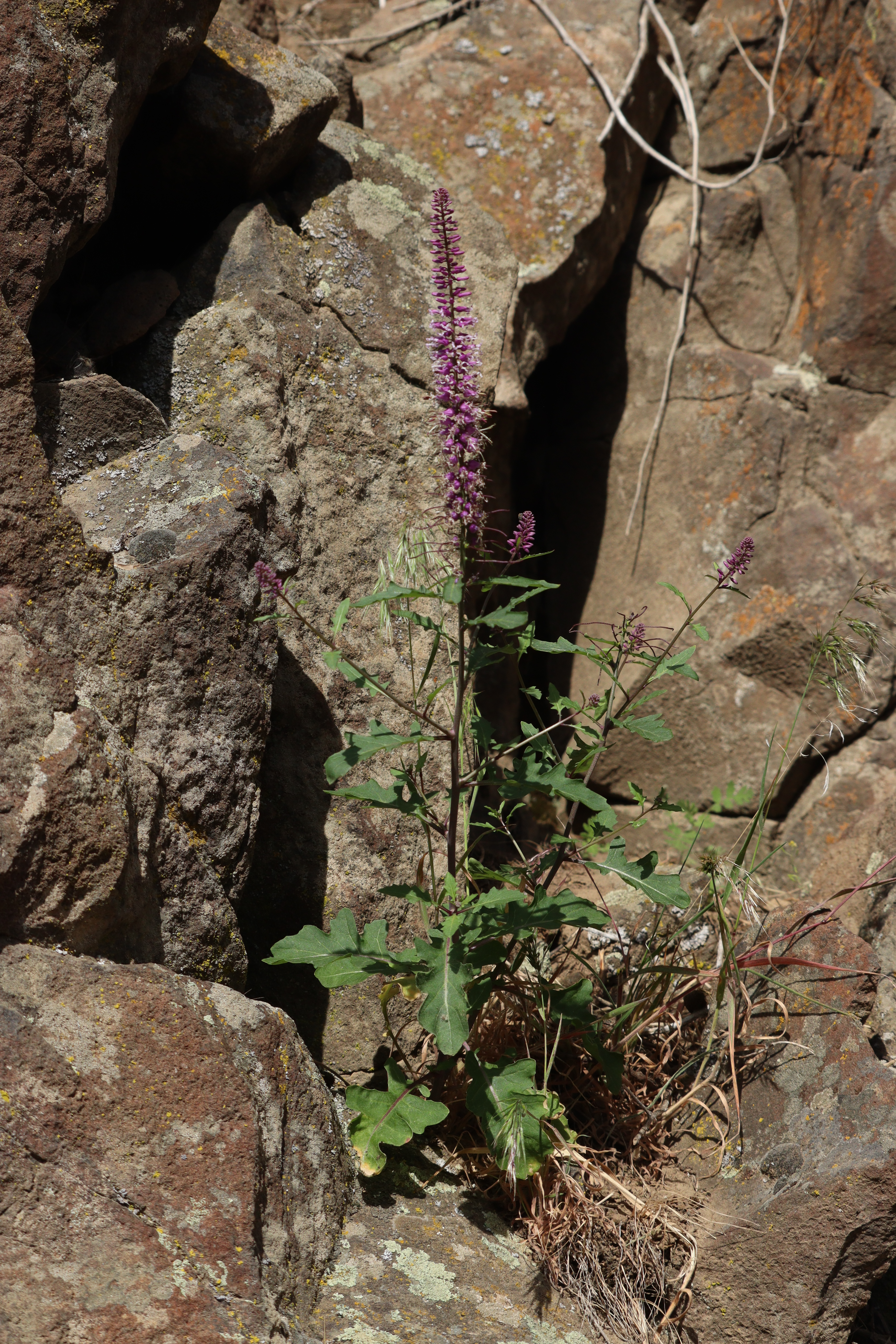

Scientific classification
- Kingdom: Plantae
- Clade: Tracheophytes
- Clade: Angiosperms
- Clade: Eudicots
- Clade: Rosids
- Order: Brassicales
- Family: Brassicaceae
- Genus: Thelypodium
- Species: T. laciniatum

Binomial name
- Thelypodium laciniatum (Hook.) Endl. ex Walp.

= Thelypodium laciniatum =

Species of flowering plant

Thelypodium laciniatum is a species of flowering plant in the mustard family known by the common name cutleaf thelypody. It is native to western North America, particularly the Great Basin and surrounding plateau and foothill habitat, where it grows on dry rocky cliffs and hillsides in sagebrush and scrub, usually below 2,400 metres (8,000 ft) elevation.

== Description ==
Thelypodium laciniatum is a biennial herb which grows from a taproot resembling a radish. It produces many erect stems, sometimes exceeding one meter in height. The stems are hairless, solid, and often waxy in texture. The thick green basal leaves have blades divided into several lance-shaped lobes or segments; leaves higher on the plant are smaller and less divided.

The large inflorescence is a dense, spikelike raceme of mustardlike flowers with four sepals and four petals, which are both whitish or pale lavender; they bloom in early summer. The fruit is a narrow, cylindrical silique up to 10 to 14 centimeters long. In fruit the raceme is covered in the siliques, which curve or stick straight out like whiskers.
