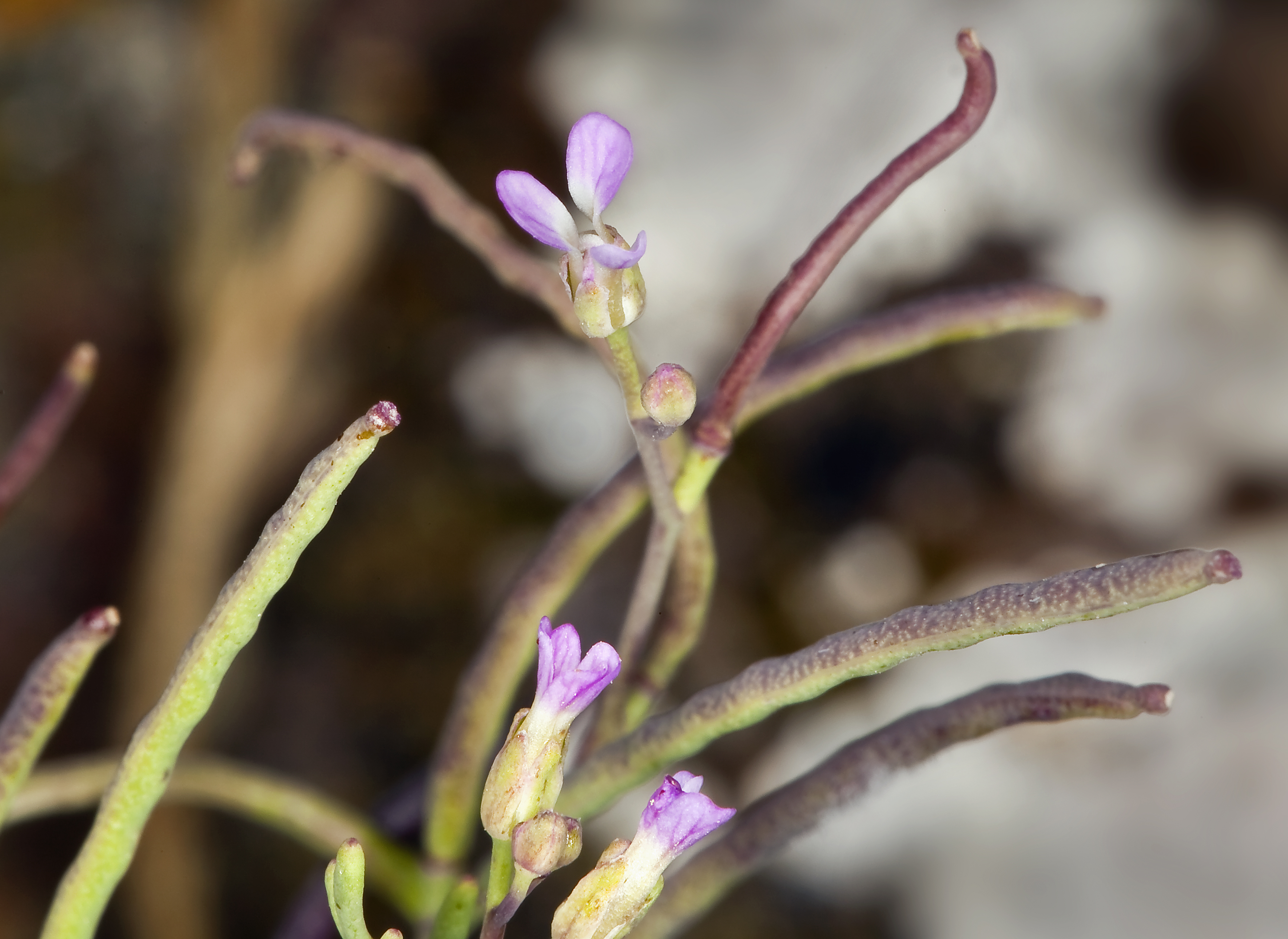

Conservation status
- Endangered (ESA)

Scientific classification
- Kingdom: Plantae
- Clade: Tracheophytes
- Clade: Angiosperms
- Clade: Eudicots
- Clade: Rosids
- Order: Brassicales
- Family: Brassicaceae
- Genus: Sibara
- Species: S. filifolia

Binomial name
- Sibara filifolia Greene

Synonyms
- Arabis filifolia

= Sibara filifolia =

Species of flowering plant

Sibara filifolia, the Santa Cruz Island winged rockcress or Santa Cruz Island rockcress, is a rare species of flowering plant in the family Brassicaceae. It is endemic to the Channel Islands of California, where it is now known from a few occurrences on San Clemente Island and one population on Catalina Island.

It was once present on Santa Cruz Island, and perhaps other Channel Islands, but these occurrences were extirpated by feral goats and pigs. The plant was feared extinct until small remaining occurrences were discovered in 1986. A 1995 estimate of the total remaining population was 500 individuals. The plant became a federally listed endangered species of the United States in 1997, along with Cercocarpus traskiae and Lithophragma maximum, two other rare Channel Islands plants.

== Description ==
Sibara filifolia is an annual herb producing a hairless, sometimes waxy stem up to around 30 centimeters in maximum height. The leaves are very narrow and almost strandlike, measuring less than a millimeter wide, and growing about 1.5 centimeters long. The flowers each have four spoon-shaped lavender petals a few millimeters long. The fruit is a flattened, elongated silique up to 4 centimeters long containing tiny seeds.

== Distribution and habitat ==
Sibara filifolia grows in the coastal sage scrub of two islands off the coast of southern California.
