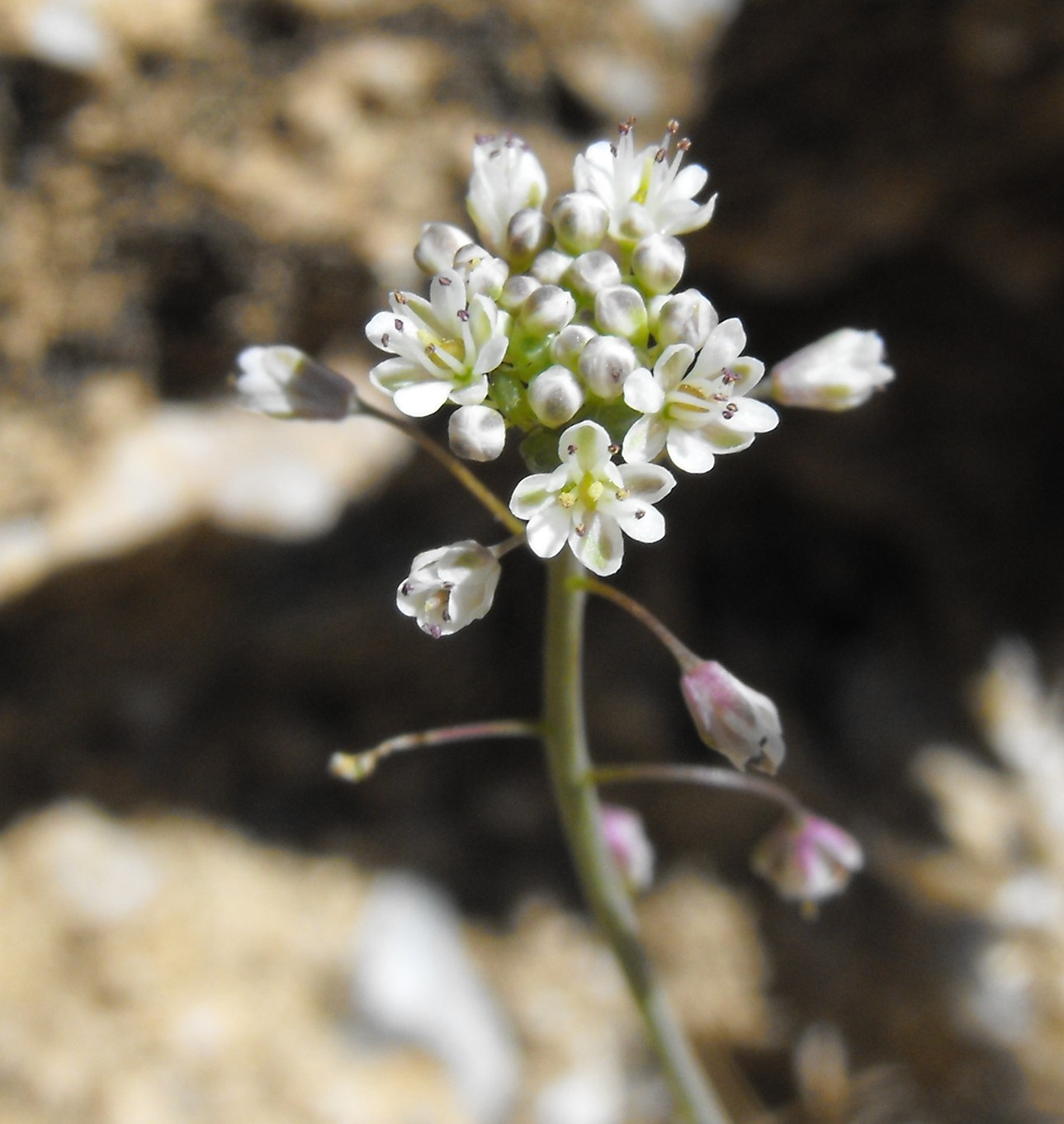

Scientific classification
- Kingdom: Plantae
- Clade: Tracheophytes
- Clade: Angiosperms
- Clade: Eudicots
- Clade: Rosids
- Order: Brassicales
- Family: Brassicaceae
- Genus: Thysanocarpus
- Species: T. laciniatus

Binomial name
- Thysanocarpus laciniatus Nutt.

= Thysanocarpus laciniatus =

Species of flowering plant

Thysanocarpus laciniatus is a species of flowering plant in the family Brassicaceae known by the common name mountain fringepod. It is native to California and Baja California, where it grows in many types of habitat. It is a common plant in much of its range. It is an annual herb producing a slender, branching or unbranched stem 10 to 60 centimeters tall. It is somewhat waxy in texture and generally lacks hairs. The leaves are linear to lance-shaped and smooth-edged or toothed. They measure up to 4 centimeters in length. The inflorescence is a raceme of small whitish or purplish flowers. The fruit is a flattened, rounded or oval disclike capsule with a thin wing around the edge.
