= Romanschulzia =

Scientific classification
- Kingdom: Plantae
- Clade: Tracheophytes
- Clade: Angiosperms
- Clade: Eudicots
- Clade: Rosids
- Order: Brassicales
- Family: Brassicaceae
- Genus: Romanschulzia; O.E.Schulz

Synonyms
- Lexarzanthe Diego & Calderón

Genus of flowering plant

Romanschulzia is a genus of flowering plants belonging to the family Brassicaceae.

Its native range is Mexico and Central America. It is found in Costa Rica, Guatemala, and Panamá.

The genus name of Romanschulzia is in honour of Roman Schulz (1873–1926), a German botanist and teacher in Berlin. It was first described and published in Bot. Jahrb. Syst. Vol.66 on page 99 in 1933.

== Known species ==
According to Kew:

- Romanschulzia alpina Standl. & Steyerm.
- Romanschulzia apetala Rollins
- Romanschulzia arabiformis (DC.) Rollins
- Romanschulzia correllii Rollins
- Romanschulzia costaricensis (Standl.) Rollins
- Romanschulzia elata Rollins
- Romanschulzia guatemalensis (Standl.) Rollins
- Romanschulzia guerrerensis Bustam. & R.M.Fonseca
- Romanschulzia mexicana Iltis & Al-Shehbaz
- Romanschulzia meyeri Rollins
- Romanschulzia orizabae (Schltdl. & Cham.) O.E.Schulz
- Romanschulzia rzedowskii Rollins
- Romanschulzia schistacea Rollins
- Romanschulzia subclavata Rollins
