= Thelypodium brachycarpum =

Scientific classification
- Kingdom: Plantae
- Clade: Tracheophytes
- Clade: Angiosperms
- Clade: Eudicots
- Clade: Rosids
- Order: Brassicales
- Family: Brassicaceae
- Genus: Thelypodium
- Species: T. brachycarpum

Binomial name
- Thelypodium brachycarpum Torr.

Species of flowering plant

Thelypodium brachycarpum is a species of flowering plant in the mustard family known by the common names shortpod thelypody and short-podded thelypodium. It is native to parts of northern California and southern Oregon, where it grows in several types of habitat, including alkaline wetlands and serpentine soils.

It is a rhizomatous perennial herb growing erect to a maximum height over one meter, the stem sometimes branching. The thick, waxy leaves may be divided into lobes, especially the largest basal leaves, which may reach 20 centimeters long. Leaves higher on the plant may clasp the stem at their bases.

The inflorescence is a dense, spikelike raceme of many mustardlike flowers with white, crinkly petals. The fruit is a cylindrical silique 1 to 3 centimeters long with several seeds inside.
