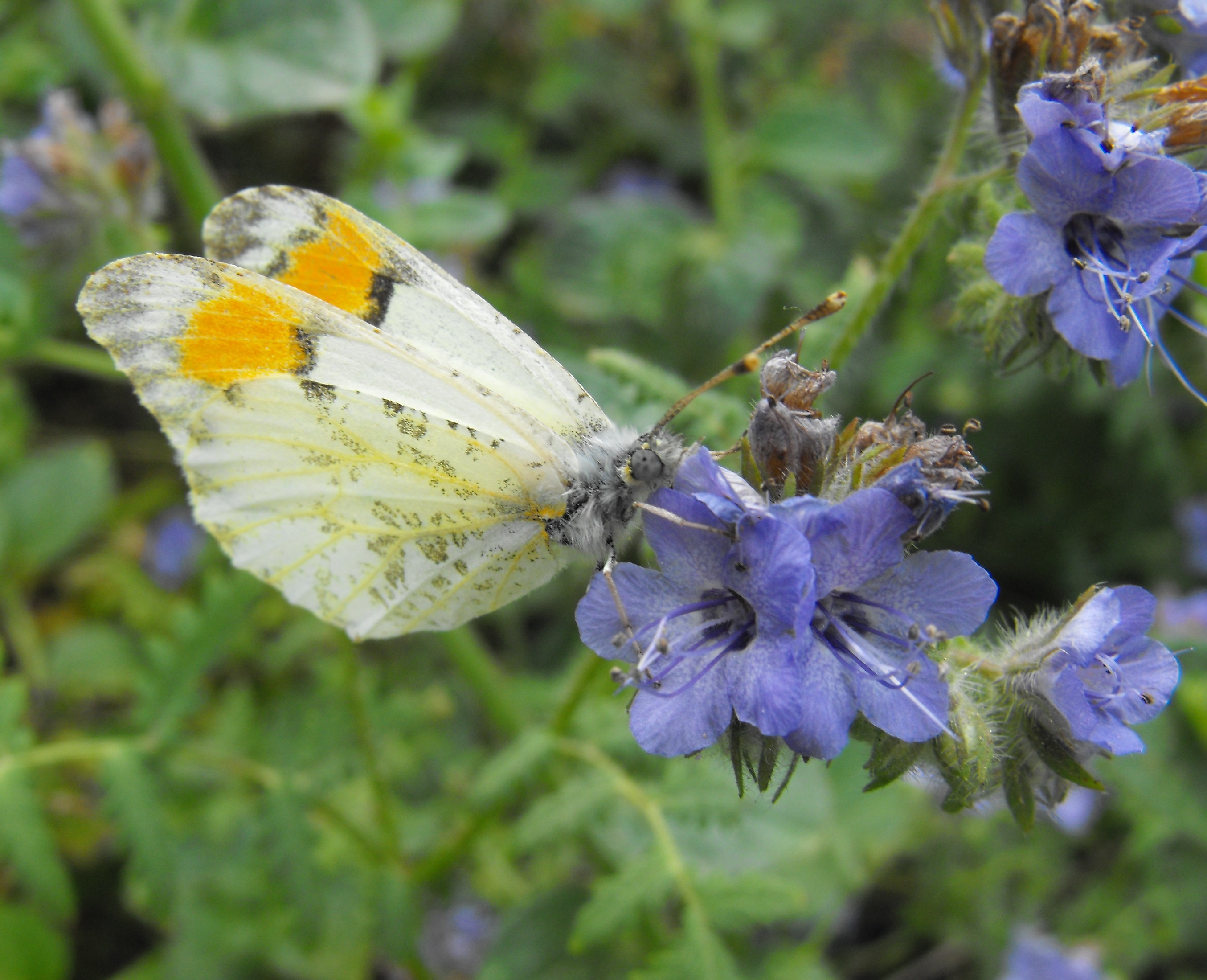

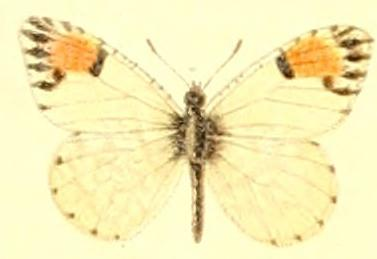

Conservation status
- Apparently Secure (NatureServe)

Scientific classification
- Kingdom: Animalia
- Phylum: Arthropoda
- Class: Insecta
- Order: Lepidoptera
- Family: Pieridae
- Genus: Anthocharis
- Species: A. cethura

Binomial name
- Anthocharis cethura C. Felder & R. Felder, 1865

= Anthocharis cethura =

Species of butterfly

Anthocharis cethura, the desert orangetip or Felder's orangetip, is a species of butterfly in the subfamily Pierinae. It is native to the southwestern United States and northern Mexico, where it lives on hills and ridges in rocky desert habitat.

The male and female look similar. The wingspan is between 2.6 and 4 centimetres (1 and 1 1/2 in). The wings are yellow with an orange patch toward the front of the forewing outlined in black and white. The edges of the wings are spotted with black. The underside of the hindwing has greenish bands.

The adults appear early in the spring. Males congregate in the midday sun to wait for females to emerge, and are more easily observed than females, which are active later in the day. The flight pattern is quick and erratic.

The female lays eggs singly on host plants. The conical eggs are blue green when fresh, then turn orange. During early stages the caterpillar is green with a purple stripe outlined in white. In its last instar it is white with mottled markings. The larvae feed mostly on plants of the mustard family. They have been noted on lyreleaf jewelflower (Streptanthus carinatus), London rocket (Sisymbrium irio), western tansymustard (Descurainia pinnata), sand fringepod (Thysanocarpus curvipes), and California mustard (Streptanthus lasiophyllus).

There are many subspecies. The subspecies A. c. catalina is endemic to Santa Catalina Island, California.
