= Edwin Blake Payson =

American botanist

Edwin Blake Payson (born Norwood, Colorado, February 18, 1893; died Denver, Colorado, May 15, 1927) was an American botanist.

== Early life ==
Payson was the son of Amon R. Payson (1859–1938), a cattle rancher and one of the founders of Naturita, Colorado. Payson's mother Sarah Payson (1869–1893) died about a month after his birth.

Payson went to Montrose High School in Montrose and then attended the University of Wyoming where he received a B.A. in 1917.

Following graduation he entered the military, where he served in the 89th Infantry Division. He trained at Camp Funston, then returned to Laramie for his marriage to Louise Butler, a fellow botany student. After the end of World War I, Payson was an instructor at the American Expeditionary Forces University at Beaune, France. Payson returned to the United States in May of 1919.

He was a teaching fellow at the Washington University in St. Louis school of botany and earned a M.A. (1920) and a PhD (1921) there.

== Career ==
Payson then became an associate professor of botany at the University of Wyoming, where he was a protégé of former college president and botany department founder Dr. Aven Nelson. In 1926 he was raised to full professor. Unfortunately he suffered a partial paralysis of his left arm in 1926, underwent gall bladder surgery in 1927, and died shortly afterwards of heart failure.

== Some of his works ==
- "The North American species of Aquilegia" (1918)
- "A Monograph of the Genus Lesquerella" (1921)
- "A monographic study of Thelypodium and its immediate allies" (1923)
- "A Monograph of the Section Oreocarya of Cryptantha" (1927)

== Recognitions ==
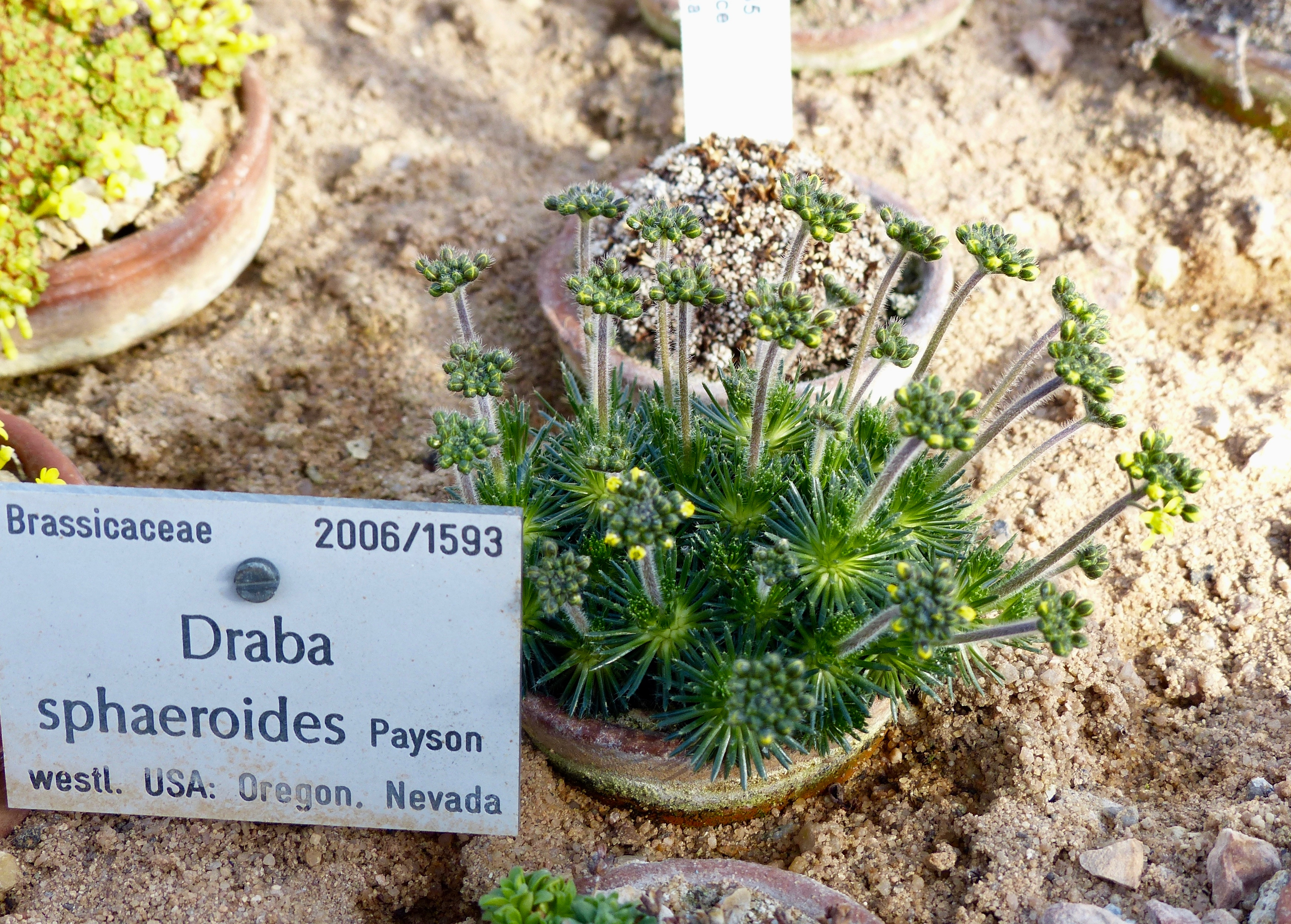
Draba sphaeroides, a species of whitlow-grass described by Payson

Shortly before his death Payson was awarded a Guggenheim Fellowship to "continue evolutionary and taxonomic studies of flowering plants of the families Cruciferae and Ranunculaceae with special emphasis on the question of generic phylogenies; the genera Draba and Aquilegia are to be studied in detail, mainly at Kew Gardens, London".

Payson described and named many species, and a number were named in his honor following his "untimely end", as The American Botanist called it. The genus Paysonia (a part of the former genus Lesquerella which Payson studied) and the species Cryptantha paysonii, Dryopetalon paysonii, and Astragalus paysonii are named in his honor.

The standard author abbreviation Payson is used to indicate this person as the author when citing a botanical name.

== Personal life ==
Payson married Louise "Lois" Elizabeth Butler (1895–1970), a botanist, librarian, and plant collector. She was a niece of Laramie sheriff N. K. Boswell. Payson and his wife are buried in neighboring plots in Greenhill Cemetery in Laramie, Wyoming.
