= Thelypodium flexuosum =

Scientific classification
- Kingdom: Plantae
- Clade: Tracheophytes
- Clade: Angiosperms
- Clade: Eudicots
- Clade: Rosids
- Order: Brassicales
- Family: Brassicaceae
- Genus: Thelypodium
- Species: T. flexuosum

Binomial name
- Thelypodium flexuosum B.L.Rob.

Species of flowering plant

Thelypodium flexuosum is a species of flowering plant in the mustard family known by the common name nodding thelypody. It is native to the Great Basin and surrounding plateau habitat in the northwestern United States, from California and Nevada to Idaho.

It grows in scrubby habitat among the shrubs of the sagebrush.

Thelypodium flexuosum is a perennial herb growing from a woody caudex covered with layers of the dried bases of previous seasons' leaves. It has a deep taproot. It produces slender, branching, bending or erect stems up to 60 or 80 centimeters in maximum height. The basal leaves have waxy, lance-shaped blades on long petioles. Leaves higher on the plant are shorter and have bases that clasp the stem. The inflorescence is a dense, spikelike raceme of mustardlike flowers with lavender or whitish petals. The fruit is a cylindrical silique up to 4 centimeters long with several seeds inside.
