= Rhammatophyllum =

Scientific classification
- Kingdom: Plantae
- Clade: Tracheophytes
- Clade: Angiosperms
- Clade: Eudicots
- Clade: Rosids
- Order: Brassicales
- Family: Brassicaceae
- Genus: Rhammatophyllum; O.E.Schulz

Species
- See text

Synonyms
- Dendroarabis (C.A.Mey. & Bunge) D.A.German & Al-Shehbaz; Koeiea Rech.f.; Mitophyllum O.E.Schulz; Prionotrichon Botsch. & Vved.

Genus of flowering plants

Rhammatophyllum is a genus of plants in the family Brassicaceae, found primarily in Central Asia.

== Species ==
Ten species are accepted.

- Rhammatophyllum afghanicum (Rech.f.) Al-Shehbaz & O.Appel
- Rhammatophyllum erysimoides (Kar. & Kir.) Al-Shehbaz & O.Appel
- Rhammatophyllum flexuosum (Rech.f.) Al-Shehbaz & O.Appel
- Rhammatophyllum frutex Botsch. & Vved.
- Rhammatophyllum fruticulosum (C.A.Mey.) Al-Shehbaz
- Rhammatophyllum gaudanense (Litv.) Al-Shehbaz & O.Appel
- Rhammatophyllum ghoranum (Rech.f.) Al-Shehbaz & O.Appel
- Rhammatophyllum kamelinii (Botsch.) Al-Shehbaz & O.Appel
- Rhammatophyllum pachyrhizum O.E.Schulz
- Rhammatophyllum pseudoparrya (Botsch. & Vved.) Al-Shehbaz & O.Appel
