= Hollermayera =

Scientific classification
- Kingdom: Plantae
- Clade: Tracheophytes
- Clade: Angiosperms
- Clade: Eudicots
- Clade: Rosids
- Order: Brassicales
- Family: Brassicaceae
- Genus: Hollermayera; O.E.Schulz
- Species: H. valdiviana

Binomial name
- Hollermayera valdiviana (Phil.) Ravenna

Synonyms
- Armoracia valdiviana Phil.; Hollermayera silvatica O.E.Schulz

Genus of plants

Hollermayera is a monotypic genus of flowering plants belonging to the family Brassicaceae. It only contains one species, Hollermayera valdiviana (Phil.) Ravenna

It is native to Chile.

The genus name of Hollermayera is in honour of Athanasius Hollermayer (1860–1945), a German clergyman and plant collector in Chile. The Latin specific epithet of valdiviana refers to the city of Valdivia in Chile. It was first described and published by George Bentham in London J. Bot. Vol.4 on page 633 in 1845.

The genus of Hollermayera was first described and published in Notizbl. Bot. Gart. Berlin-Dahlem Vol.10 on page 463 in 1928. The species, Hollermayera valdiviana was first described and published in Nordic J. Bot. Vol.1 on page 142 in 1981.
