= Mostacillastrum =

Scientific classification
- Kingdom: Plantae
- Clade: Tracheophytes
- Clade: Angiosperms
- Clade: Eudicots
- Clade: Rosids
- Order: Brassicales
- Family: Brassicaceae
- Genus: Mostacillastrum; O.E.Schulz (1924)

Species
- 31; see text

Synonyms
- Phlebiophragmus O.E.Schulz (1924)

Genus of flowering plants

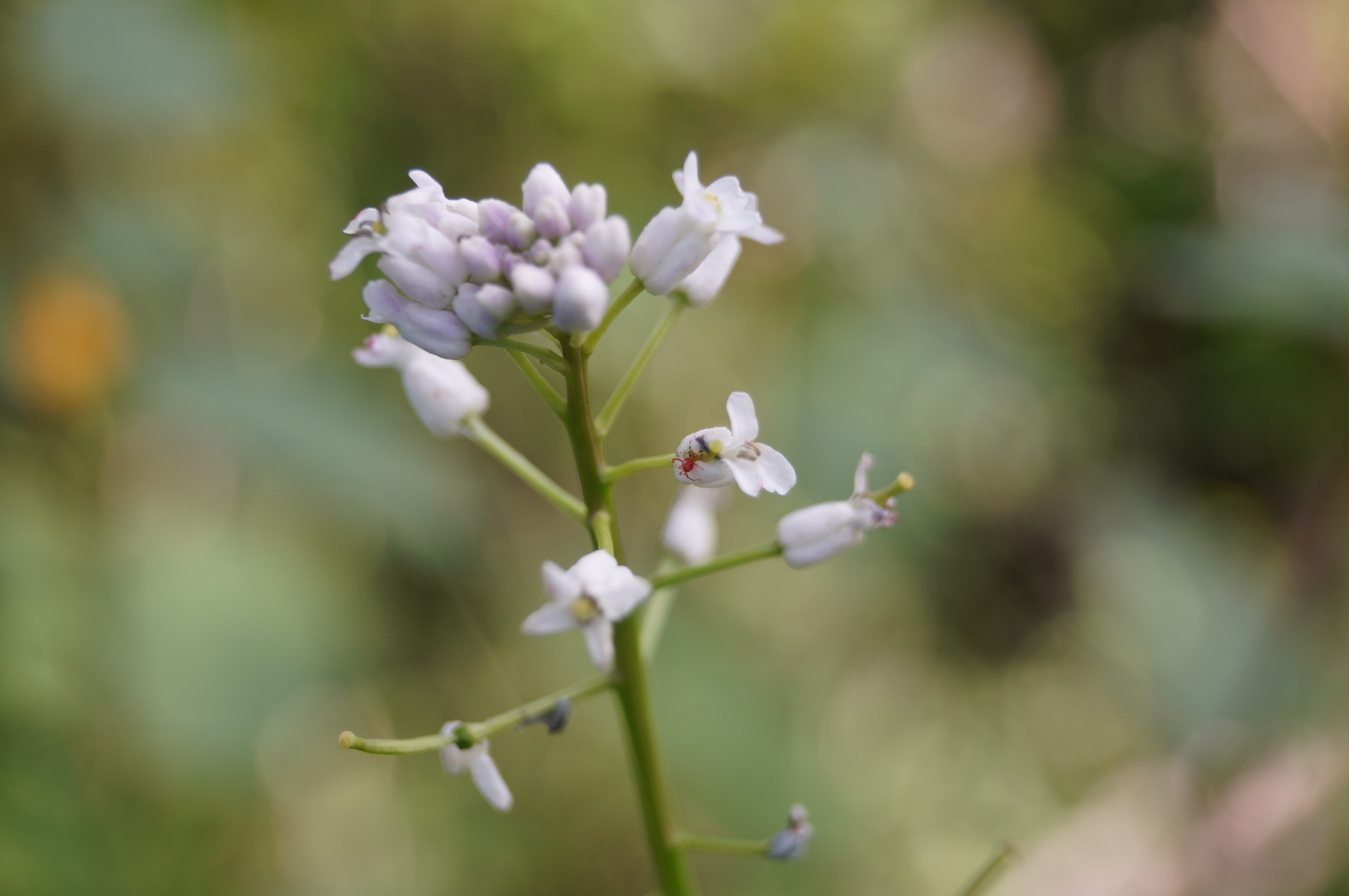
Mostacillastrum gracielae, endemic of Mexico.

Mostacillastrum is a genus of flowering plants in the mustard family, Brassicaceae. It includes 31 species native to the Americas, including from Arizona and Texas to central Mexico, Venezuela, Haiti, and from Peru to southern Argentina.

== Species ==
31 species are accepted.

- Mostacillastrum ameghinoi (Speg.) O.E.Schulz
- Mostacillastrum andinum (Phil.) Al-Shehbaz
- Mostacillastrum arcuatum (Rollins) Al-Shehbaz
- Mostacillastrum carolinense (Scappini, C.A.Bianco & Prina) Al-Shehbaz
- Mostacillastrum commune (Speg.) Al-Shehbaz
- Mostacillastrum dianthoides (Phil.) Al-Shehbaz
- Mostacillastrum ekmanii (O.E.Schulz) Al-Shehbaz
- Mostacillastrum ferreyrae (Förther & Weigend) Al-Shehbaz
- Mostacillastrum gracielae (M.Martínez & L.Hern.) Al-Shehbaz & M.Martínez
- Mostacillastrum gracile (Wedd.) Al-Shehbaz
- Mostacillastrum haitiense (O.E.Schulz) Al-Shehbaz
- Mostacillastrum hunzikeri Al-Shehbaz
- Mostacillastrum incisum (Rollins) Al-Shehbaz
- Mostacillastrum leptocarpum (Hook. & Arn.) Al-Shehbaz
- Mostacillastrum longipes (Rollins) Al-Shehbaz
- Mostacillastrum morrisonii (Al-Shehbaz) Al-Shehbaz
- Mostacillastrum oleraceum (O.E.Schulz) Al-Shehbaz
- Mostacillastrum orbignyanum (E.Fourn.) Al-Shehbaz
- Mostacillastrum pandurifolium (Kuntze) Al-Shehbaz
- Mostacillastrum pectinifolium (Al-Shehbaz) Al-Shehbaz
- Mostacillastrum purpusii (Brandegee) Al-Shehbaz
- Mostacillastrum retrofractum (Rollins) Al-Shehbaz
- Mostacillastrum saltaense Al-Shehbaz
- Mostacillastrum stenophyllum (Gillies ex Hook. & Arn.) O.E.Schulz
- Mostacillastrum subauriculatum Al-Shehbaz
- Mostacillastrum subscandens (Speg.) Al-Shehbaz
- Mostacillastrum vaseyi (J.M.Coult.) Al-Shehbaz
- Mostacillastrum ventanense (Boelcke) Al-Shehbaz
- Mostacillastrum versicolor (Brandegee) Al-Shehbaz
- Mostacillastrum volckmannii (Phil.) D.A.German & Al-Shehbaz
- Mostacillastrum weberbaueri (O.E.Schulz) Al-Shehbaz
