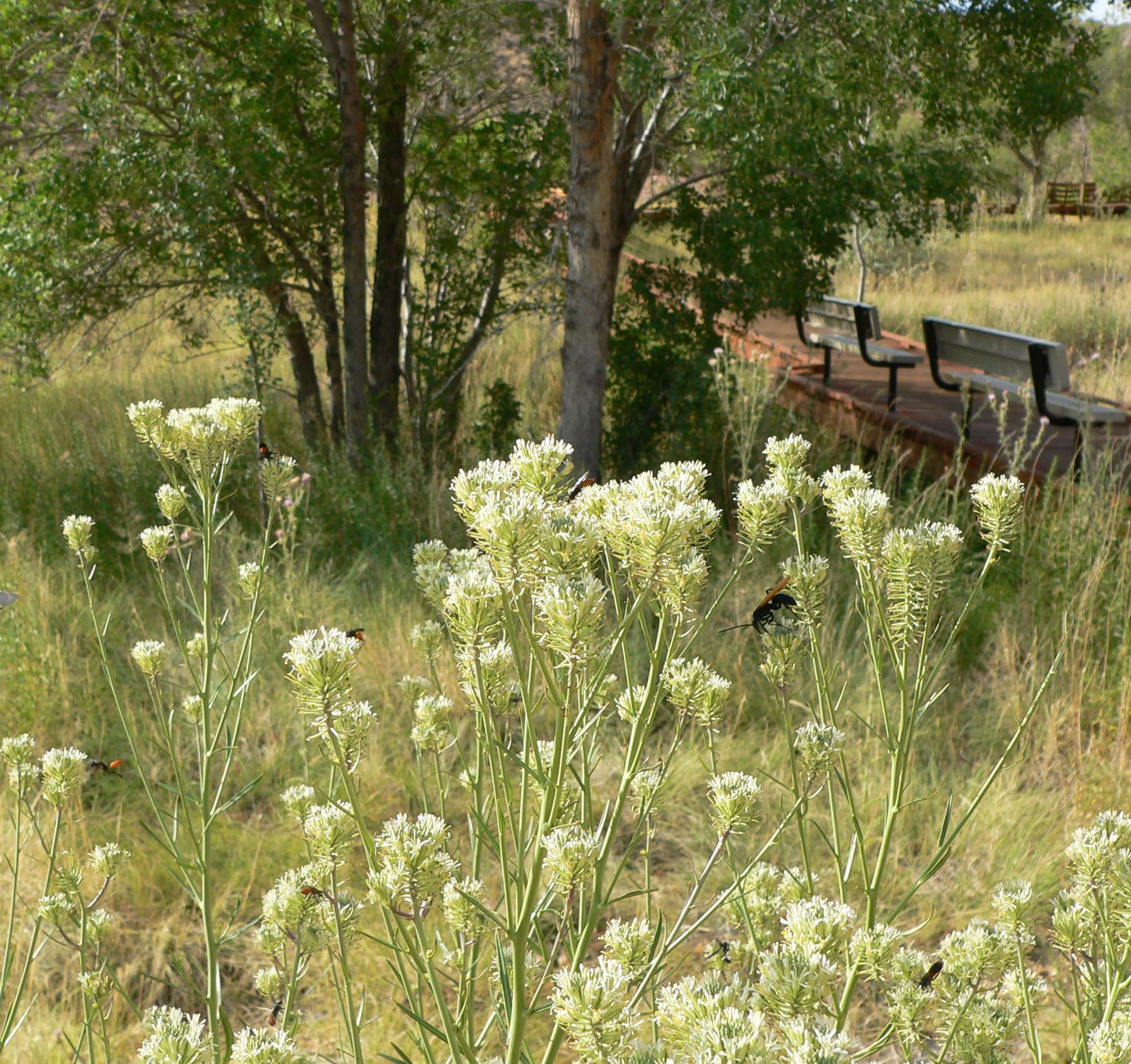
- Thelypodium integrifolium subsp. affine

Conservation status
- Secure (NatureServe)

Scientific classification
- Kingdom: Plantae
- Clade: Tracheophytes
- Clade: Angiosperms
- Clade: Eudicots
- Clade: Rosids
- Order: Brassicales
- Family: Brassicaceae
- Genus: Thelypodium
- Species: T. integrifolium

Binomial name
- Thelypodium integrifolium (Nutt.) Endl. ex Walp.

= Thelypodium integrifolium =

Species of flowering plant

Thelypodium integrifolium is a species of flowering plant in the mustard family known by the common names entireleaved thelypody and foxtail thelypodium. It is native to much of the western United States, including the Great Basin and surrounding plateaus and deserts.

It occurs in several types of habitat, often growing in sandy, mineral-rich, and alkaline soils, such as those on playas.

== Description ==
Thelypodium integrifolium is a biennial herb producing a hairless, waxy stem with a thick, sturdy base, unbranched or branching toward the top and sometimes becoming quite tall, approaching three meters in maximum height. The thick, waxy leaves are not compound or lobed, having smooth edges. The largest basal leaves may exceed 30 centimetres (12 in) in length. Leaves higher on the plant are shorter and are smooth-edged or toothed.

The inflorescence is a dense, cylindrical, spikelike raceme of white or purplish flowers. The fruit is a silique which may be eight centimetres (3.1 in) long.

=== Subspecies ===
There are five subspecies:

- T. i. ssp. affine - white petals - Mojave Desert (California), Great Basin.
- T. i. ssp. complanatum - mainly limited to the Great Basin; generally with lavender petals.
- T. i. ssp. gracilipes - native to the Four Corners region
- T. i. ssp. integrifolium - widespread in the northern distribution of the species
- T. i. ssp. longicarpum - endemic to Arizona, where it is known only from the Grand Canyon and vicinity
