= Chaunanthus =

Scientific classification
- Kingdom: Plantae
- Clade: Tracheophytes
- Clade: Angiosperms
- Clade: Eudicots
- Clade: Rosids
- Order: Brassicales
- Family: Brassicaceae
- Genus: Chaunanthus; O.E.Schulz

Genus of flowering plants

Chaunanthus is a genus of flowering plants belonging to the family Brassicaceae.

Its native range is Mexico.

Species:

- Chaunanthus acuminatus (Rollins) R.A.Price & Al-Shehbaz
- Chaunanthus mexicanus (Rollins) R.A.Price & Al-Shehbaz
- Chaunanthus petiolatus (Hemsl.) O.E.Schulz
- Chaunanthus torulosus Al-Shehbaz
