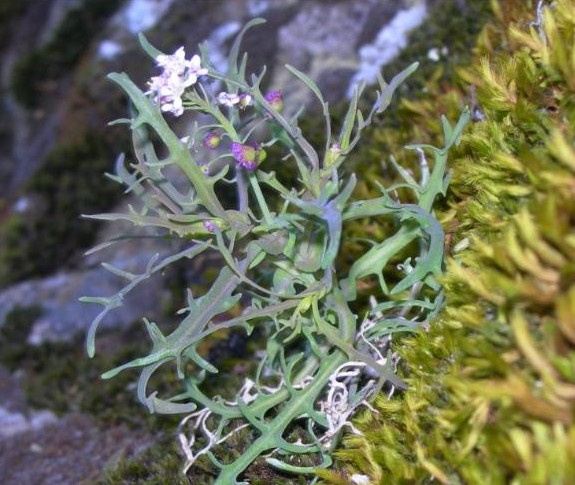

Conservation status
- Imperiled (NatureServe)

Scientific classification
- Kingdom: Plantae
- Clade: Tracheophytes
- Clade: Angiosperms
- Clade: Eudicots
- Clade: Rosids
- Order: Brassicales
- Family: Brassicaceae
- Genus: Thysanocarpus
- Species: T. conchuliferus

Binomial name
- Thysanocarpus conchuliferus Greene

= Thysanocarpus conchuliferus =

Species of flowering plant

Thysanocarpus conchuliferus is a rare species of flowering plant in the mustard family known by the common name Santa Cruz Island fringepod. It is endemic to Santa Cruz Island, one of the Channel Islands of California, where has been recently observed at only one location; some years it is totally absent.

It is a federally listed endangered species of the United States, and a review by the US Fish & Wildlife Service in 2009 suggests it should remain on the list. The plant's habitat is the coastal scrub on the rocky, windblown slopes and canyons of its single island.

This is a delicate annual herb with slender, waxy stems growing no more than about 20 centimeters long. The leaves are linear or lance-shaped with toothed edges or sometimes lobes, and a base that clasps the stem. The inflorescence is a dense raceme of flowers with four spoon-shaped white to purple petals each about 2 millimeters long. The fruit is a flat, round, disc-like capsule with a fringed, often perforated wing encircling it.

Threats to the species have included herbivory by non-native animal species such as feral pigs, picking and trampling of plants by collectors of rare species, competition from introduced and weedy plant species such as ice plant (Carpobrotus spp.), fire suppression, and climate change. The feral pigs, which damaged many populations of rare plants, have been removed from the Channel Islands.
