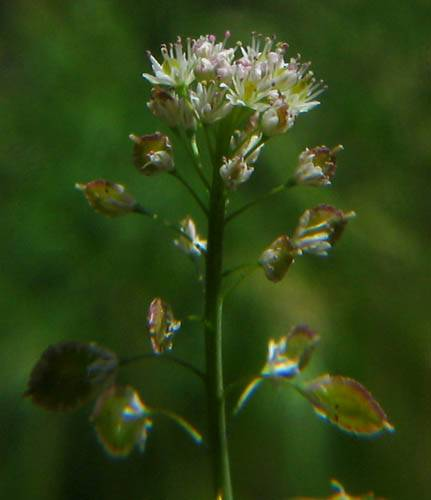
- Thysanocarpus laciniatus

Scientific classification
- Kingdom: Plantae
- Clade: Tracheophytes
- Clade: Angiosperms
- Clade: Eudicots
- Clade: Rosids
- Order: Brassicales
- Family: Brassicaceae
- Genus: Thysanocarpus; Hook.

Species
- 5, See text

= Thysanocarpus =

Genus of herbs

Thysanocarpus is a small genus of plants in the family Brassicaceae known generally as fringepods or lacepods. These are small, erect annual herbs. The flat fruit capsule is generally round or oval-shaped with a wing that goes all the way around the pod, giving it a fringed look. The fruits hang from most of the length of the stem. The plants are native to the western United States, British Columbia, and northwestern Mexico.

== Species ==
Five species are accepted.

- Thysanocarpus conchuliferus Greene – Santa Cruz Island fringepod
- Thysanocarpus curvipes Hook. – sand fringepod
- Thysanocarpus erectus S.Watson
- Thysanocarpus laciniatus Nutt. – mountain fringepod
- Thysanocarpus radians Benth. – ribbed fringepod
