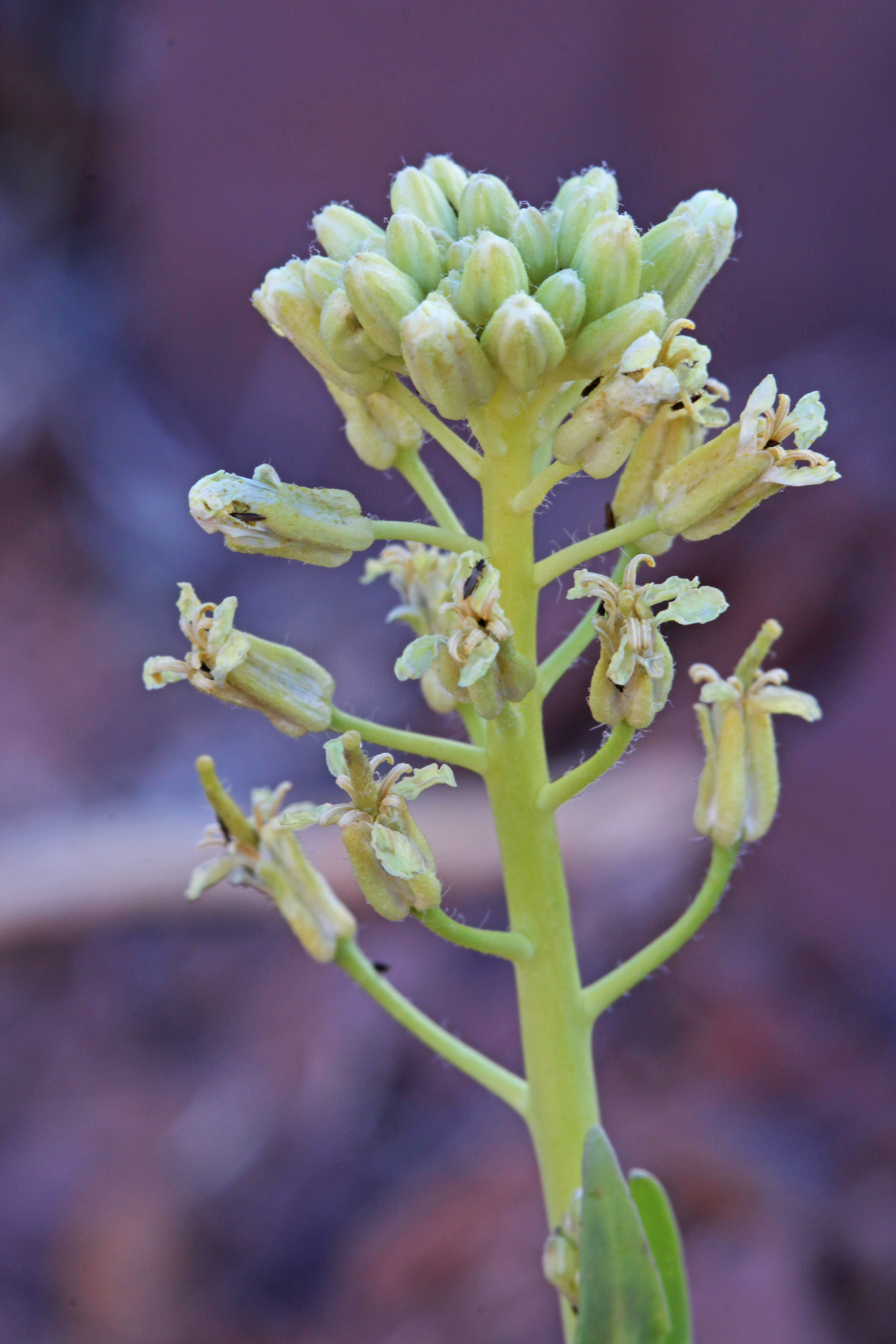
- Thelypodiopsis divaricata

Scientific classification
- Kingdom: Plantae
- Clade: Tracheophytes
- Clade: Angiosperms
- Clade: Eudicots
- Clade: Rosids
- Order: Brassicales
- Family: Brassicaceae
- Genus: Thelypodiopsis; Rydb.

= Thelypodiopsis =

Genus of flowering plants

Thelypodiopsis is a genus of flowering plants belonging to the cabbage family.

Its native range is the west-central and south-central United States to northeastern Mexico.

== Taxonomy ==
Thelypodiopsis was erected by Per Axel Rydberg in 1907. He initially placed four species in the genus, but T. bakeri and T. wyomingensis are now considered synonyms of T. elegans. The remaining species, T. aurea, is accepted. The genus is classified in the Brassicaceae family.

== Species ==
Seven species are accepted according to Plants of the World Online.

- Thelypodiopsis ambigua (S.Watson) Al-Shehbaz
- Thelypodiopsis aurea (Eastw.) Rydb.
- Thelypodiopsis divaricata (Rollins) S.L.Welsh & Reveal
- Thelypodiopsis elegans (M.E.Jones) Rydb.
- Thelypodiopsis juniperorum (Payson) Rydb.
- Thelypodiopsis vermicularis (S.L.Welsh & Reveal) Rollins
- Thelypodiopsis wootonii (B.L.Rob.) Rollins
