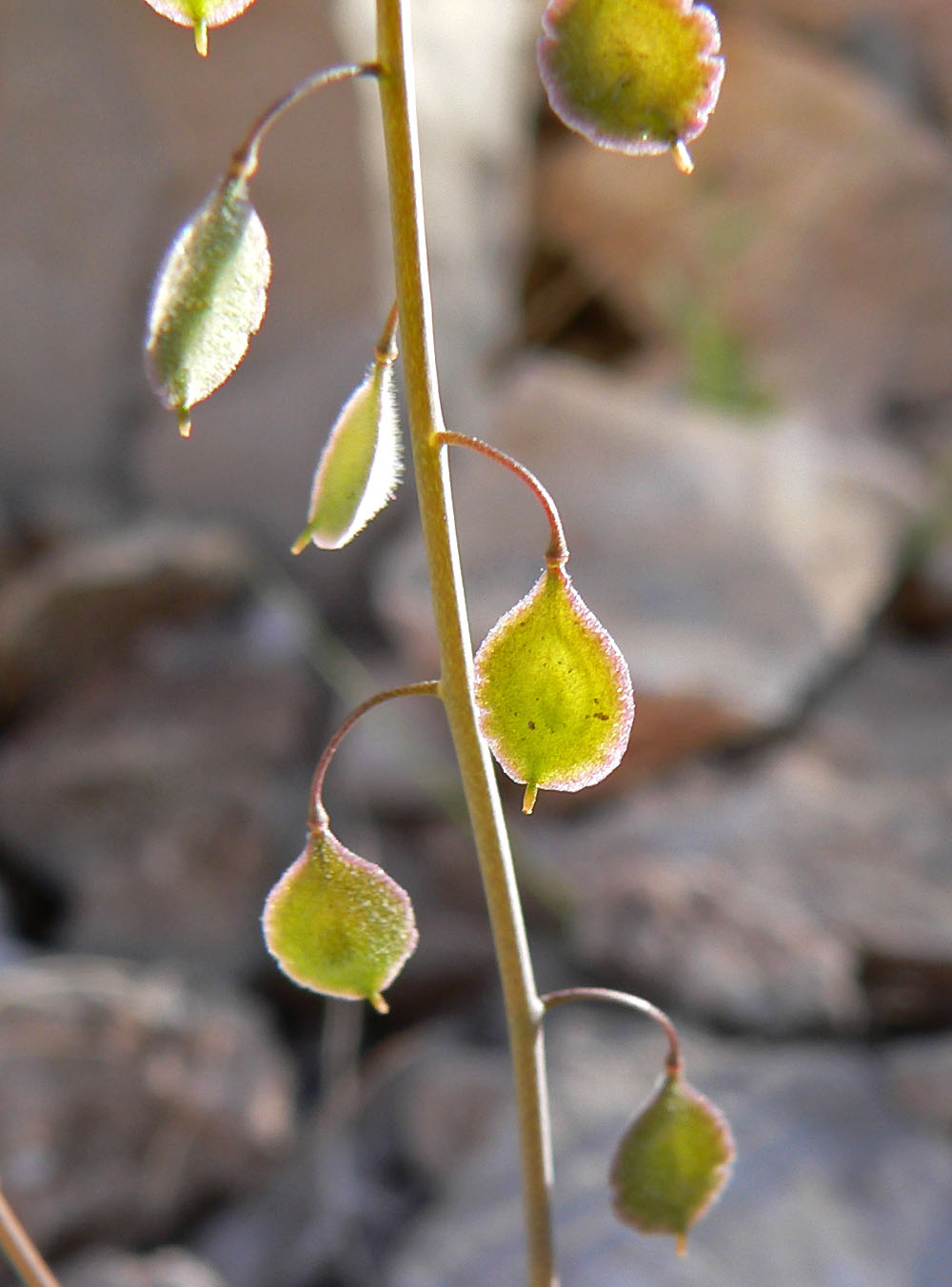
- Plant in fruit

Conservation status
- Apparently Secure (NatureServe)

Scientific classification
- Kingdom: Plantae
- Clade: Tracheophytes
- Clade: Angiosperms
- Clade: Eudicots
- Clade: Rosids
- Order: Brassicales
- Family: Brassicaceae
- Genus: Thysanocarpus
- Species: T. curvipes

Binomial name
- Thysanocarpus curvipes Hook.

= Thysanocarpus curvipes =

Species of flowering plant

Thysanocarpus curvipes is a species of flowering plant in the family Brassicaceae known by the common names sand fringepod and lacepod. It is native to western North America from British Columbia through the western United States to Baja California, where it grows in many types of habitat. It is a common plant in much of its range. It is variable in appearance. It is an annual herb producing a branching or unbranched stem 10 to 80 centimeters tall. The leaves are mostly lance-shaped but variable. The lower ones are sometimes borne on petioles and the upper ones may clasp the stem at their bases. They may be smooth-edged, toothed, or lobed. The inflorescence is a raceme of flowers with four white or purple-tinged petals and purple sepals. The fruit is a flattened, rounded or oval disclike capsule with a thin wing around the edge. The fruit is under a centimeter long and the wing is variable in appearance, flat or wavy, sometimes perforated.
