= Sarcodraba =

Scientific classification
- Kingdom: Plantae
- Clade: Tracheophytes
- Clade: Angiosperms
- Clade: Eudicots
- Clade: Rosids
- Order: Brassicales
- Family: Brassicaceae
- Genus: Sarcodraba; Gilg & Muschl.

Synonyms
- Ateixa Ravenna; Grammosperma O.E.Schulz

Genus of flowering plant

Sarcodraba is a genus of flowering plants belonging to the family Brassicaceae.

It is native to Argentina and Chile in southern South America.

== Known species ==
As accepted by Plants of the World Online;

- Sarcodraba andina O.E.Schulz
- Sarcodraba dusenii (O.E.Schulz) Al-Shehbaz
- Sarcodraba karr-aikensis (Speg.) Gilg & Muschl.
- Sarcodraba subterranea O.E.Schulz

The genus name of Sarcodraba is derived from the Greek sarx, sarkos meaning fleshy and the plant genus of Draba L. It was first described and published in Bot. Jahrb. Syst. Vol.42 on page 468 in 1909.

The genus is recognized by the United States Department of Agriculture and the Agricultural Research Service, but they do not list any known species.
