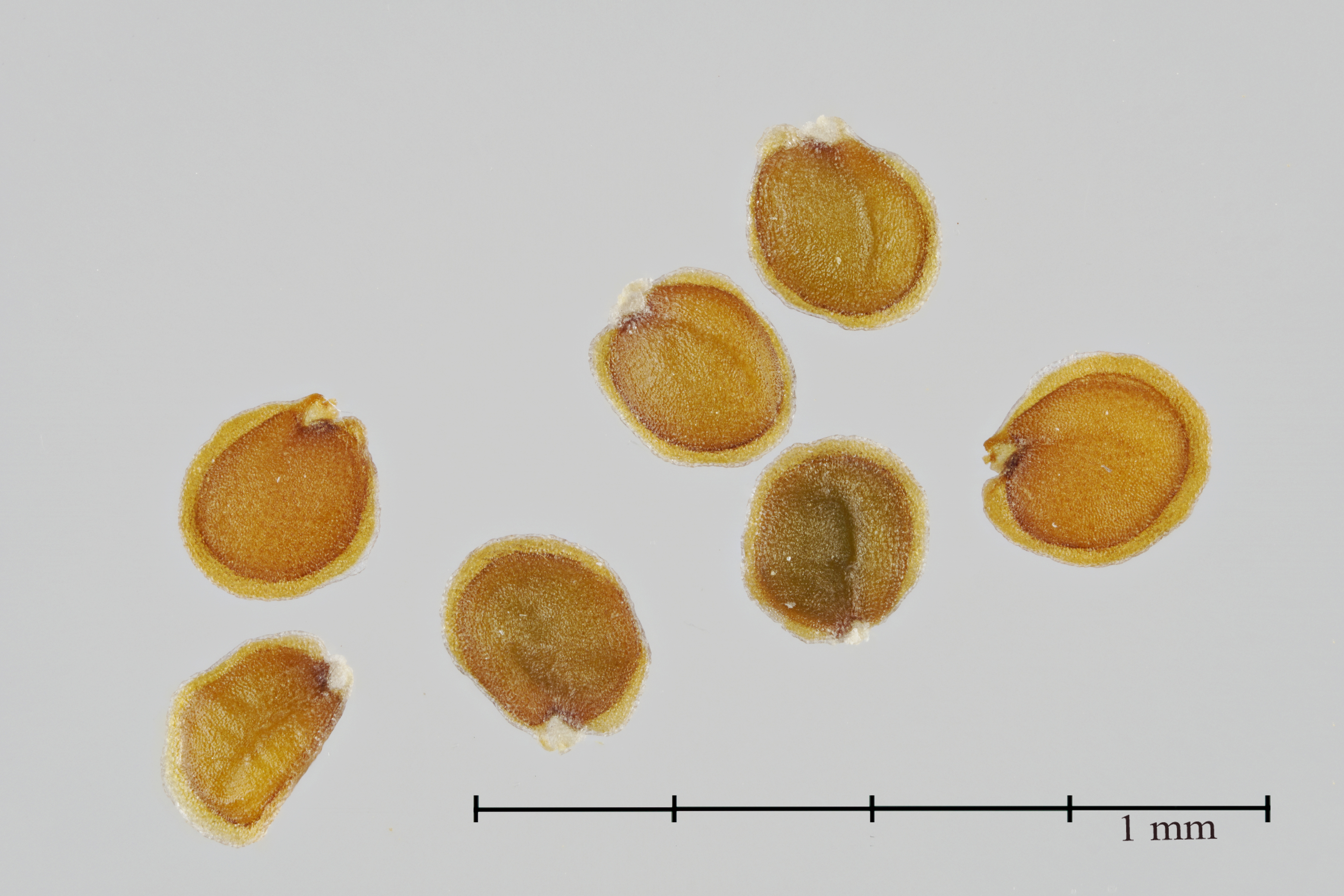
- seeds of Planodes virginicum, magnified

Scientific classification
- Kingdom: Plantae
- Clade: Tracheophytes
- Clade: Angiosperms
- Clade: Eudicots
- Clade: Rosids
- Order: Brassicales
- Family: Brassicaceae
- Genus: Planodes
- Species: P. virginicum

Binomial name
- Planodes virginicum (L.) Greene

Synonyms
- Arabis ludoviciana (Hook.) C.A.Mey.; Arabis virginica (L.) Poir.; Cardamine angustifolia Raf.; Cardamine engelmanniana Link; Cardamine hirsuta var. virginica (L.) Torr. & A.Gray; Cardamine ludoviciana Hook.; Cardamine parviflora subsp. virginica (L.) O.E.Schulz; Cardamine virginiana Panz.; Cardamine virginica L. (1753) (basionym); Erysimum ludovicianum (Hook.) Kuntze; Nasturtium ludovicianum (Hook.) O.E.Schulz; Sibara virginica (L.) Rollins; Sisymbrium ludovicianum Nutt. ex Hook.

= Planodes virginicum =

Species of flowering plant

Planodes virginicum is a species of flowering plant in the family Brassicaceae known by the common name Virginia winged rockcress. It is native to North America, where it can be found throughout the central-eastern and southeastern United States, from Texas to Iowa, Ohio, and Maryland, and in California and Baja California in the west. It grows in many types of habitat, including disturbed areas. It is an annual or biennial herb producing a basal rosette of leaves with comblike blades so deeply divided into many lobes that they may appear to have leaflets. It bolts one or more erect stems up to 30 centimeters tall. The flowers each have four spoon-shaped white petals a few millimeters long and purplish sepals. The fruit is a flattened, elongated silique up to 2.5 centimeters long containing tiny seeds.

The species was first described as Cardamine virginica by Carl Linnaeus in 1753. In 1912 Edward Lee Greene placed the species in genus Planodes as P. virginicum.
