= Thelypodiopsis aurea =

Conservation status
- Apparently Secure (NatureServe)

Scientific classification
- Kingdom: Plantae
- Clade: Tracheophytes
- Clade: Angiosperms
- Clade: Eudicots
- Clade: Rosids
- Order: Brassicales
- Family: Brassicaceae
- Genus: Thelypodiopsis
- Species: T. aurea

Binomial name
- Thelypodiopsis aurea (Eastw.) Rydb.

Synonyms
- Thelypodium aureum (Eastw.) Sisymbrium aureum (Eastw.) Payson

Species of mustard plant

Thelypodiopsis aurea, the Durango tumblemustard or Durango tumble-mustard, is a species of mustard native to Arizona, Colorado, New Mexico, and Utah. This species is restricted to the Four Corners area and is only present in Apache County in Arizona, Montezuma County in Colorado, Sandoval & San Juan Counties in New Mexico, and San Juan County in Utah.

== Description ==
A biennial or short-lived perennial from a taproot, glabrous or rarely sparsely pubescent with simple hairs at the stem base. Leaves are somewhat fleshy. Inflorescence is an elongating fruit. Flower petals are yellow, and fruit is a silique on stipes 2–8 mm long. Seeds are oblong. Flowering occurs from April to May. The plant can reach up to 3 ft. tall.

From a distance, this can be mistaken for Stanleya pinnata but up-close the two are distinct.

== Distribution ==
Thelypodiopsis aurea is endemic to the Four Corners Region. They can be found near ledges, alkali flats, clay flats & hills, desert shrub, Pinon-Juniper, badlands, and saltbush communities. It can be found at elevations of 1200 to 2200 meters.
