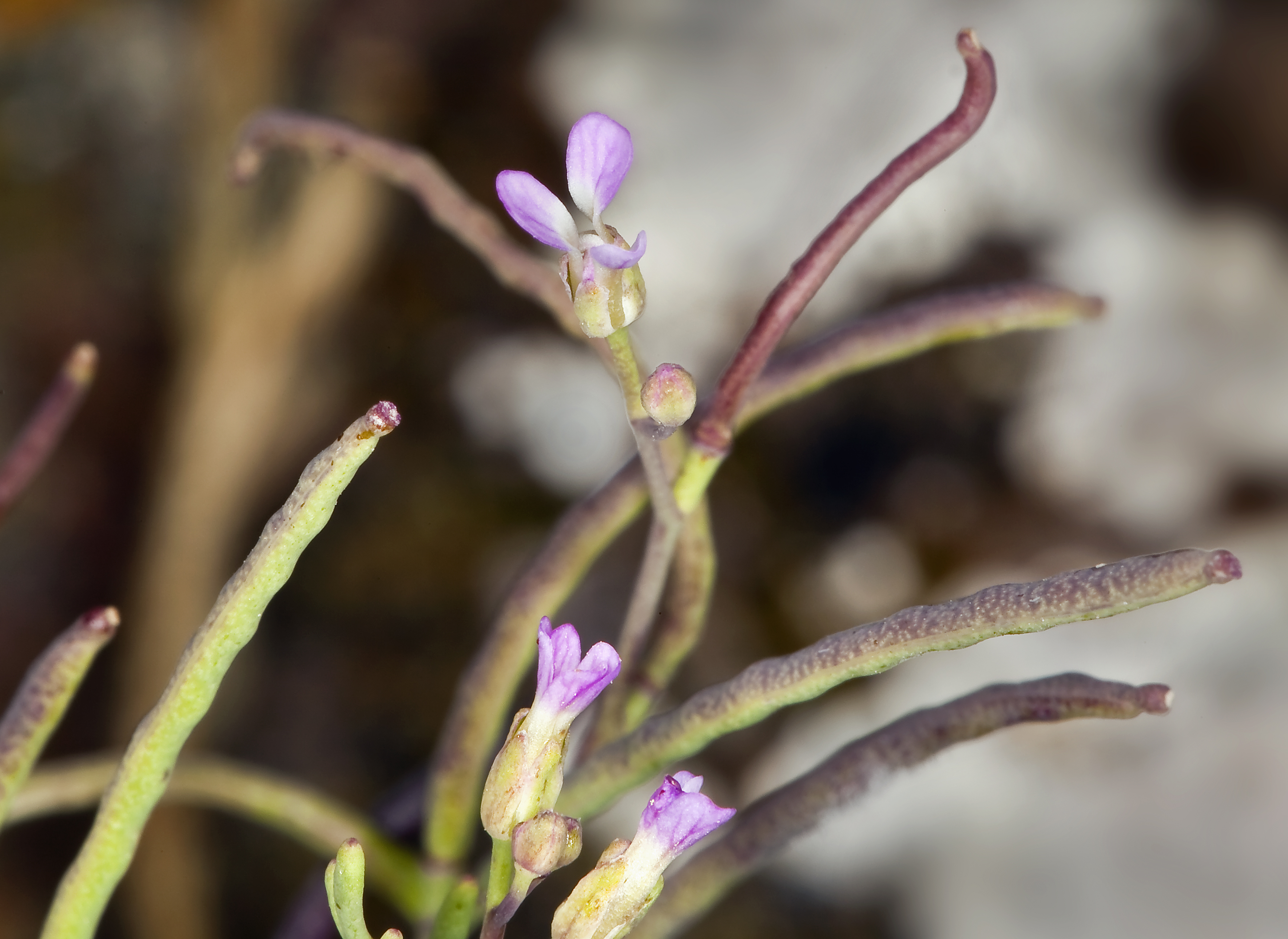
- Sibara filifolia

Scientific classification
- Kingdom: Plantae
- Clade: Tracheophytes
- Clade: Angiosperms
- Clade: Eudicots
- Clade: Rosids
- Order: Brassicales
- Family: Brassicaceae
- Genus: Sibara; Greene

Species
- 12, see text

Synonyms
- Pterygiosperma O.E.Schulz; Werdermannia O.E.Schulz

= Sibara =

Genus of flowering plants

Sibara is a genus of twelve plant species in the family Brassicaceae known commonly as the winged rockcresses. They are native to southwestern United States and northwestern Mexico and to southern South America. Sibara are similar to cardamines, sending up thin herbaceous stems that bear tiny white to purple flowers. Seeds are borne in flat, laterally compressed, fleshy fruits up to an inch long.

== Species ==
12 species are accepted.

- Sibara anethifolia (Phil.) Al-Shehbaz
- Sibara angelorum (S.Watson) Greene
- Sibara brandegeeana (Rose) Greene
- Sibara davidsonii Al-Shehbaz
- Sibara deserti (M.E.Jones) Rollins - desert winged rockcress
- Sibara dilloniorum Al-Shehbaz
- Sibara filifolia (Greene) Greene - Santa Cruz Island winged rockcress
- Sibara laxa (S.Watson) Greene
- Sibara macrostachya (Phil.) Al-Shehbaz
- Sibara mendocina (Boelcke & S.C.Arroyo) Al-Shehbaz
- Sibara pinnata (Barnéoud) Al-Shehbaz
- Sibara tehuelches (Speg.) Al-Shehbaz

=== Formerly placed here ===
- Planodes virginicum (L.) Greene (as Sibara virginica (L.) Rollins) - Virginia winged rockcress
