= Dryopetalon =

Scientific classification
- Kingdom: Plantae
- Clade: Tracheophytes
- Clade: Angiosperms
- Clade: Eudicots
- Clade: Rosids
- Order: Brassicales
- Family: Brassicaceae
- Genus: Dryopetalon; A.Gray

Genus of plants

Dryopetalon is a genus of flowering plants belonging to the family Brassicaceae.

Its native range is the Southern United States to Northern Mexico.

Species:

- Dryopetalon auriculatum (A.Gray) Al-Shehbaz
- Dryopetalon breedlovei (Rollins) Al-Shehbaz
- Dryopetalon byei (Rollins) Al-Shehbaz
- Dryopetalon crenatum (Brandegee) Rollins
- Dryopetalon membranifolium Rollins
- Dryopetalon palmeri (S.Watson) O.E.Schulz
- Dryopetalon paysonii (Rollins) Al-Shehbaz
- Dryopetalon runcinatum A.Gray
- Dryopetalon stenocarpum Al-Shehbaz
