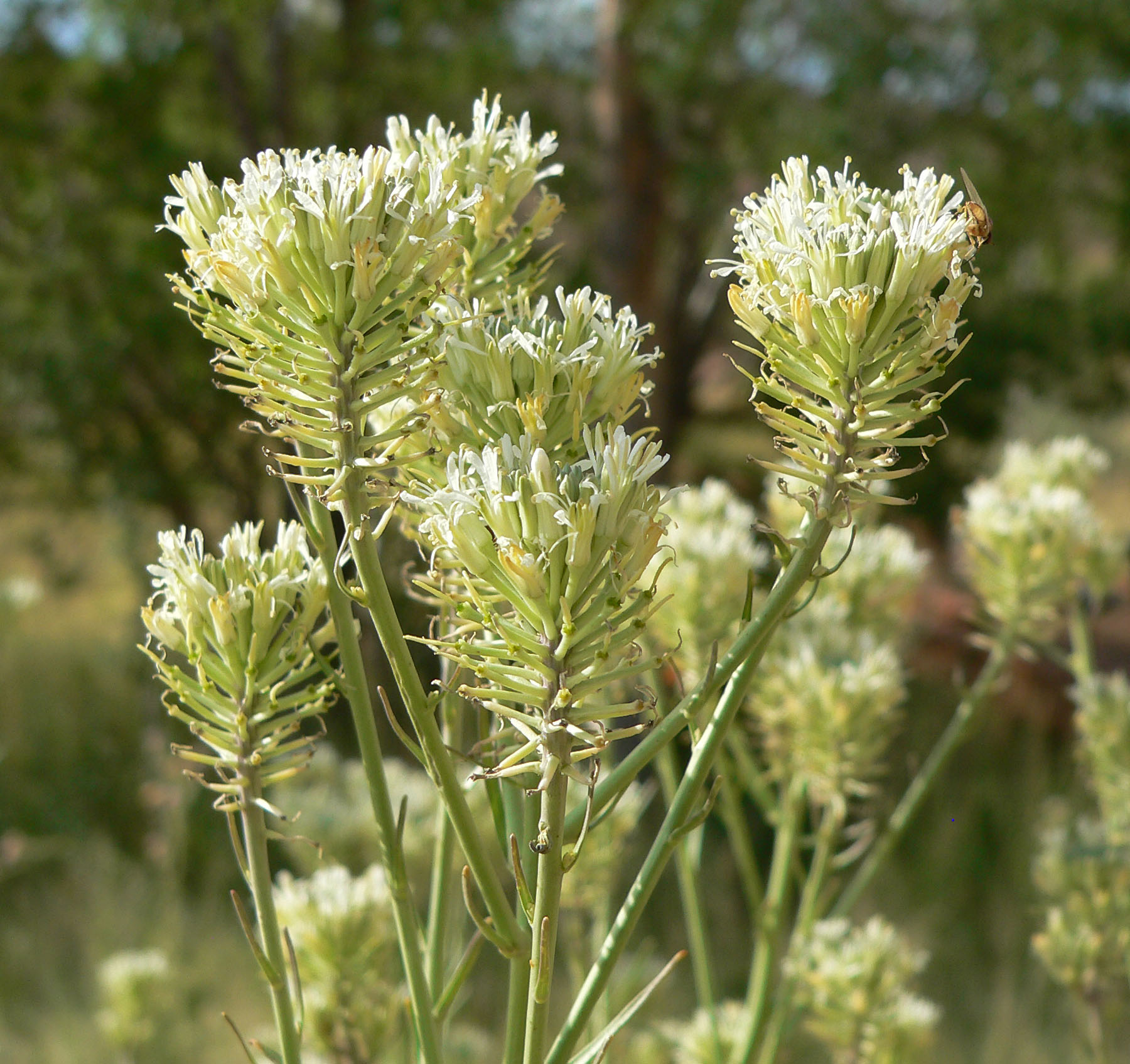
- Thelypodium integrifolium

Scientific classification
- Kingdom: Plantae
- Clade: Tracheophytes
- Clade: Angiosperms
- Clade: Eudicots
- Clade: Rosids
- Order: Brassicales
- Family: Brassicaceae
- Genus: Thelypodium; Endl.

Species
- 16 to 20, see text

Synonyms
- Pachypodium Nutt.; Pleurophragma Rydb.; Stanleyella Rydb.

= Thelypodium =

Genus of flowering plants

Thelypodium is a genus of flowering plants in the mustard family. There are 16 to 20 species, all native to western North America. Thelypody is a common name for plants in this genus.

== Species ==
Plants of the World Online accepts 17 species.

- Thelypodium brachycarpum (Torr.) Torr. - shortpod thelypody
- Thelypodium crispum Greene- crisped thelypody
- Thelypodium eucosmum B.L.Rob. - world thelypody
- Thelypodium flexuosum B.L.Rob. - nodding thelypody
- Thelypodium howellii S.Watson - Howell's thelypody
- Thelypodium integrifolium (Nutt.) Endl. - entireleaved thelypody
- Thelypodium laciniatum (Hook.) Endl. - cutleaf thelypody
- Thelypodium laxiflorum Al-Shehbaz - droopflower thelypody
- Thelypodium milleflorum A.Nelson - manyflower thelypody
- Thelypodium paniculatum A.Nelson - northwestern thelypody
- Thelypodium repandum Rollins - wavyleaf thelypody
- Thelypodium rollinsii Al-Shehbaz - Rollins' thelypody
- Thelypodium sagittatum (Nutt.) Endl. - arrow thelypody
- Thelypodium stenopetalum S.Watson - slenderpetal thelypody (endangered)
- Thelypodium tenue Rollins - Big Bend thelypody
- Thelypodium texanum (Cory) Rollins - Texas thelypody
- Thelypodium wrightii A.Gray - Wright's thelypody
