= Otto Eugen Schulz =

German botanist

Otto Eugen Schulz (31 October 1874 – 17 February 1936) was a German botanist, born in Berlin. He was the brother of botanist Roman Schulz (1873–1926).

He published important systematic treatments of the families Brassicaceae (then known as Cruciferae) and Erythroxylaceae, and he is the authority for numerous species within these families. He was the author of a 1903 treatise on the genus Cardamine (family Brassicaceae), titled "Monographie der Gattung Cardamine".

The genus Ottoschulzia (family Metteniusaceae) was named in his honor by Ignatz Urban (1848–1931) in 1912.
