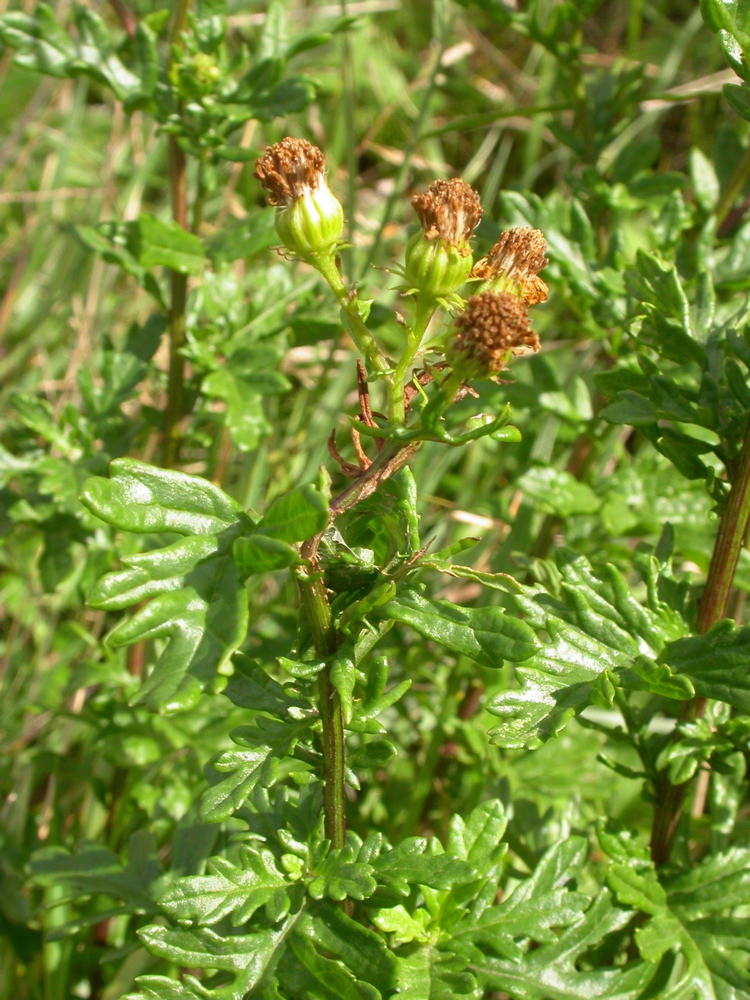

Scientific classification
- Kingdom: Plantae
- Clade: Tracheophytes
- Clade: Angiosperms
- Clade: Eudicots
- Clade: Asterids
- Order: Asterales
- Family: Asteraceae
- Genus: Jacobaea
- Species: J. erucifolia

Binomial name
- Jacobaea erucifolia (L.) G.Gaertn., B.Mey. & Scherb. (1801)

Subspecies
- Jacobaea erucifolia subsp. argunensis (Turcz.) Veldkamp; Jacobaea erucifolia subsp. erucifolia; Jacobaea erucifolia subsp. tenuifolia (J.Presl & C.Presl) B.Nord. & Greuter

Synonyms
- Senecio erucifolius L. (1755); Senecio jacobaea subsp. erucifolius (L.) Bonnier & Layens (1894)

= Jacobaea erucifolia =

Species of flowering plant

Jacobaea erucifolia, the hoary ragwort is a species of flowering plant in the genus Jacobaea and the family Asteraceae. It is a perennial or rhizomatous geophyte native to temperate Eurasia, ranging from Europe to Siberia, Turkey, Iran, Central Asia, Mongolia, China, and Japan.

Three subspecies are accepted.

- Jacobaea erucifolia subsp. argunensis (Turcz.) Veldkamp – southeastern Siberia, China, Mongolia, Korea, and Japan
- Jacobaea erucifolia subsp. erucifolia – Europe, Siberia, Turkey, Iran, Central Asia, and Mongolia
- Jacobaea erucifolia subsp. tenuifolia (J.Presl & C.Presl) B.Nord. & Greuter – France to Germany, Italy, the northern Balkans, and Ukraine
