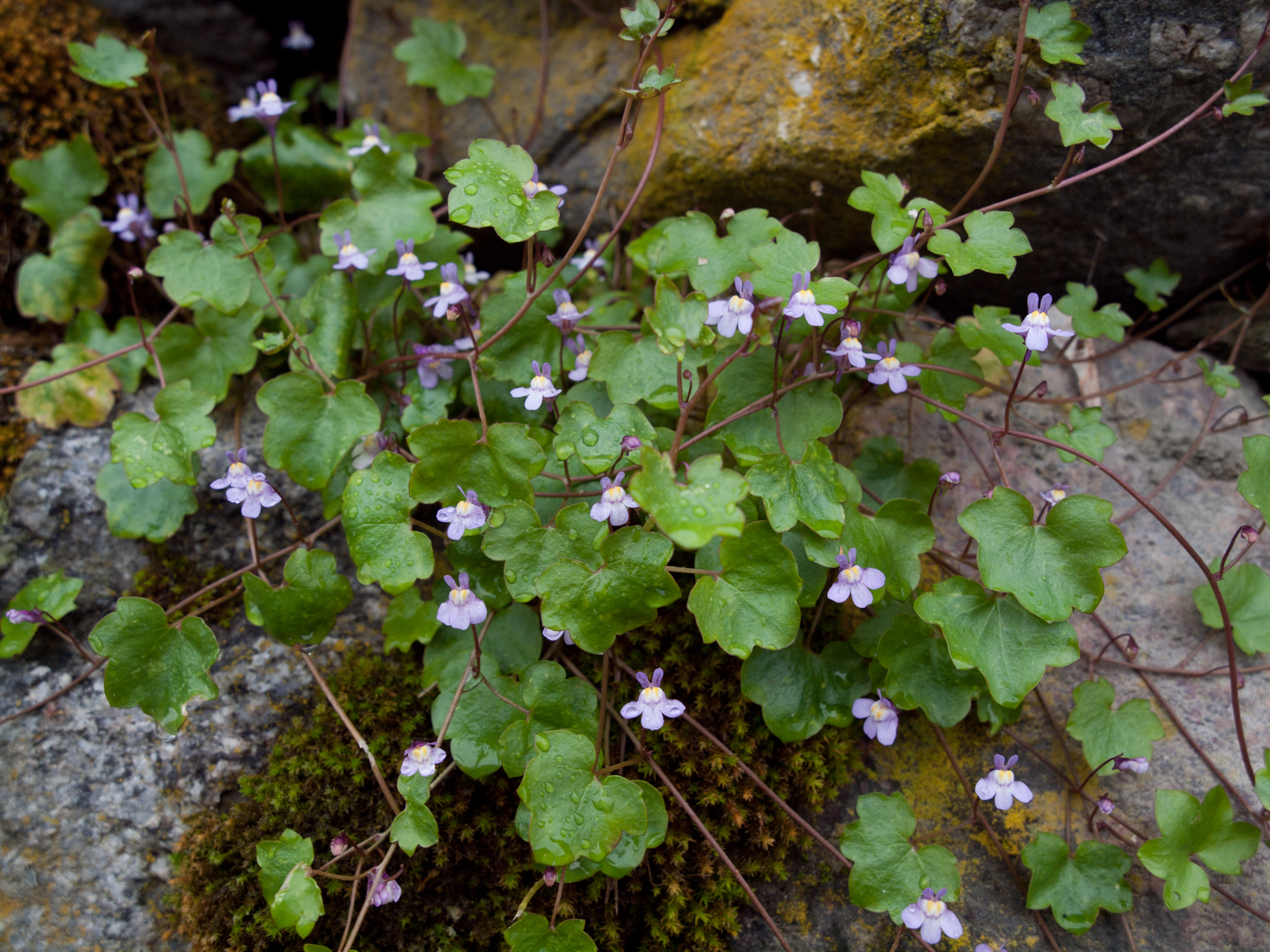
- Plant in natural habitat in northern Italy

Scientific classification
- Kingdom: Plantae
- Clade: Tracheophytes
- Clade: Angiosperms
- Clade: Eudicots
- Clade: Asterids
- Order: Lamiales
- Family: Plantaginaceae
- Genus: Cymbalaria
- Species: C. muralis

Binomial name
- Cymbalaria muralis G.Gaertn., B.Mey. & Scherb.

Subspecies
- Cymbalaria muralis subsp. muralis; Cymbalaria muralis subsp. visianii (Kümmerle ex Jáv.) D.A.Webb
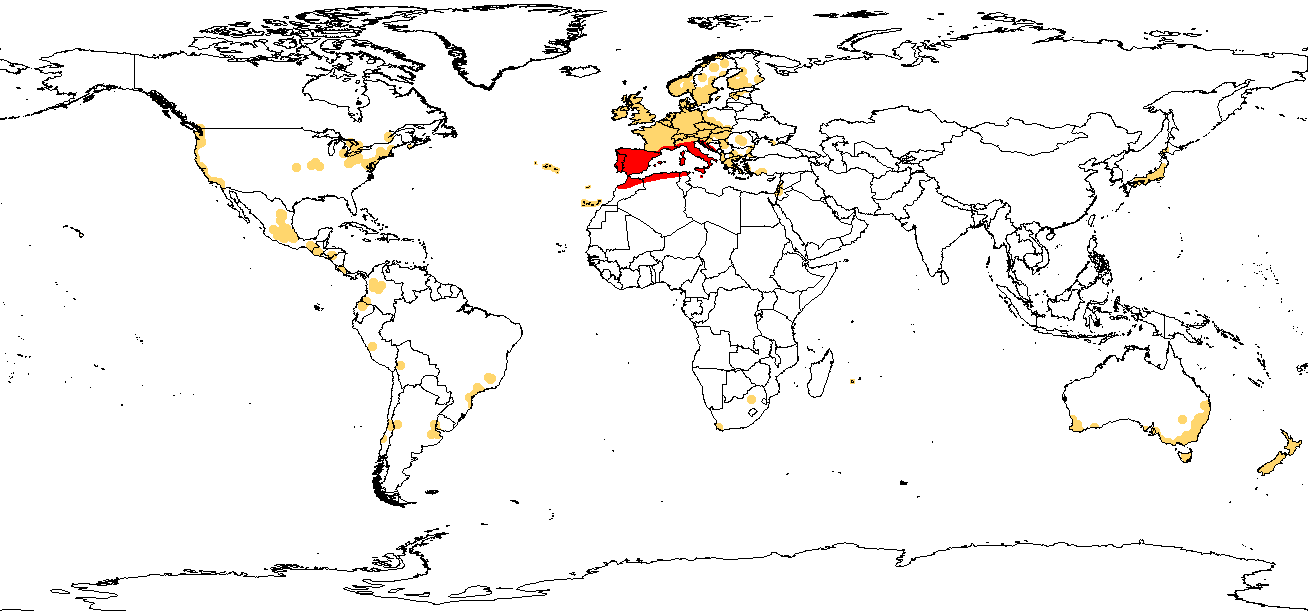
- Occurrence records from GBIF

Synonyms
- List: Antirrhinum acutangulum Ten.; Antirrhinum cimbalaria Neck.; Antirrhinum cymbalaria L.; Antirrhinum cymbalaria Sieber ex Benth.; Antirrhinum hederaceum Lam.; Antirrhinum hederifolium Salisb.; Antirrhinum muralis (G.Gaertn., B.Mey. & Scherb.) Pers.; Antirrhinum quinquelobum Stokes; Cymbalaria cymbalaria (L.) Wettst.; Cymbalaria flabellifer A.Chev.; Cymbalaria gerbaultii A.Chev.; Cymbalaria glechomifolia A.Chev.; Cymbalaria globosa (Gerbault) A.Chev.; Cymbalaria hederacea Gray; Cymbalaria muralis f. toutonii (A.Chev.) Cufod.; Cymbalaria muralis f. visianii Kümmerle ex Jáv.; Cymbalaria toutonii A.Chev.; Cymbalaria vulgaris Raf.; Elatine cymbalaria Moench; Linaria acutangula Ten.; Linaria cymbalaria (L.) Mill.; Linaria cymbalaria var. globosa Gerbault; Linaria cymbalaria var. heterophylla Gerbault; Linaria cymbalaria var. minor Goiran ex Fiori & Bég.; Linaria hederifolia Steud.; Linaria hederifolia St.-Lag.; Tursitis cymbalaria (L.) Raf.

= Cymbalaria muralis =

Southern European species of toadflax

Cymbalaria muralis, commonly called ivy-leaved toadflax, is a low, spreading, trailing plant with small purple flowers, native to rocky habitats in southern Europe. It belongs to the plantain family (Plantaginaceae), and is introduced and naturalised in many other temperate locations. The flower stalk is unusual for seeking light until it is fertilized, after which it grows away from the light. Other names include coliseum ivy, Kenilworth ivy, mother of thousands, Oxford ivy, and wandering sailor.

== Description ==
Cymbalaria muralis spreads quickly, growing 10–80 cm (3.9–31.5 in) tall. It is a biennial or short lived perennial plant. Its roots are thin and fibrous for reaching into cracks. Its rounded, heart-shaped, or kidney shaped leaves are 5–40 mm long, 6–60 mm wide, and are alternating, supported on thin petioles, usually purple, 10–22 mm long. The leaves are either smooth (glabrous) or with widely scattered hairs in the subspecies muralis, or pubescent (villous) in the subspecies visianii. They may have from three to seven lobes, but most often has five lobes. The leaves are relatively thick and often blushed with purple on their undersides.

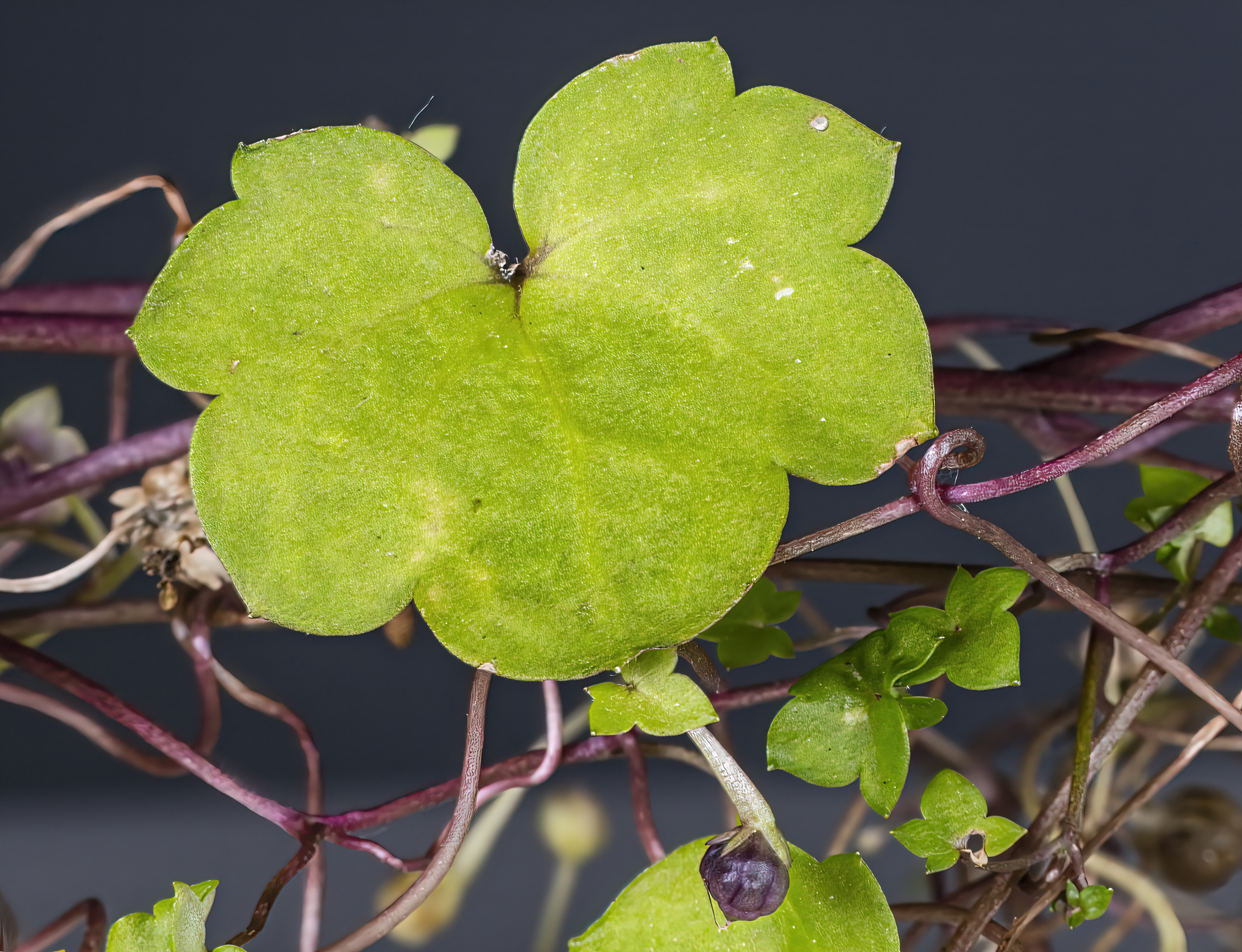
Leaves

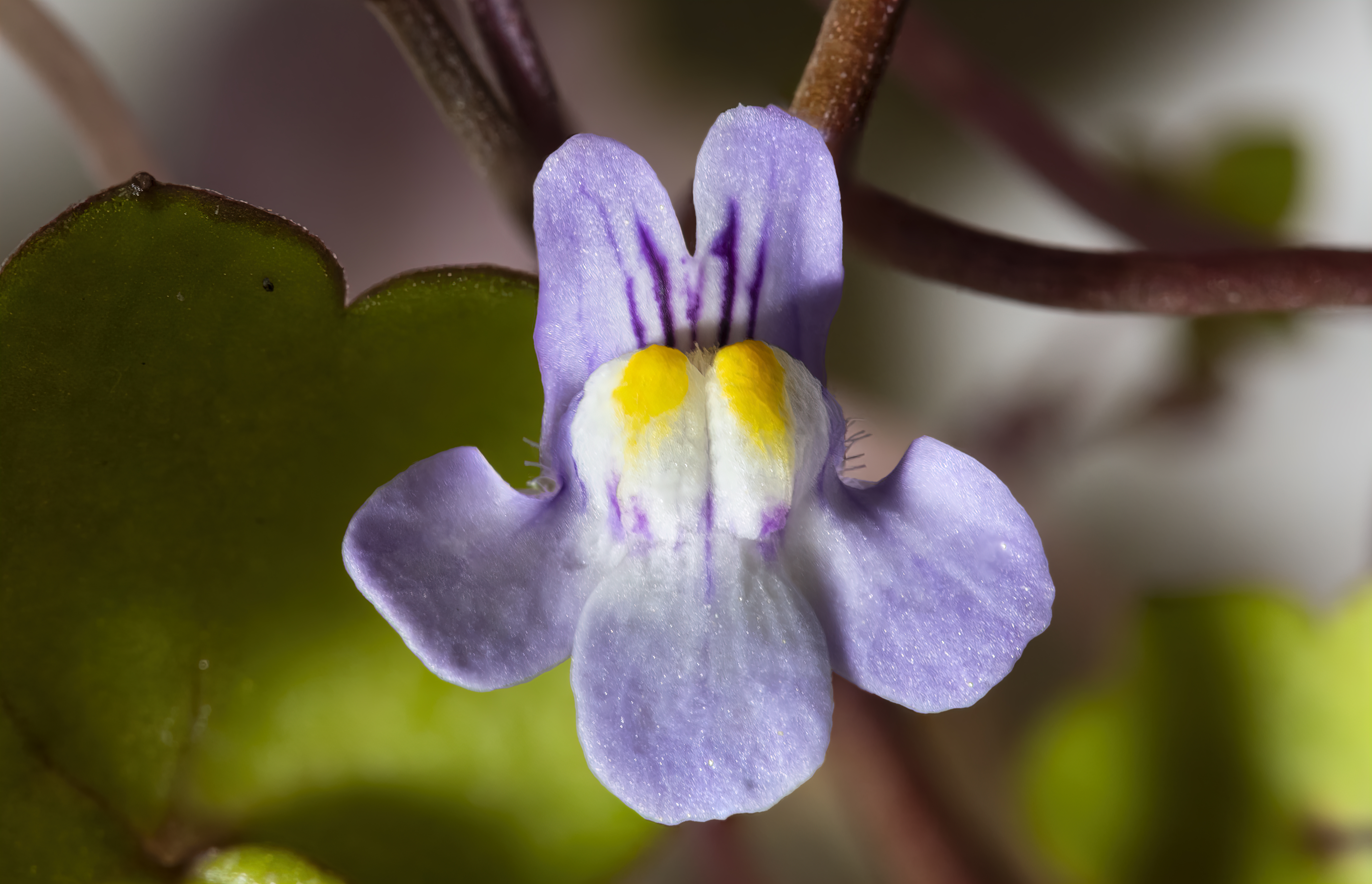
Flower

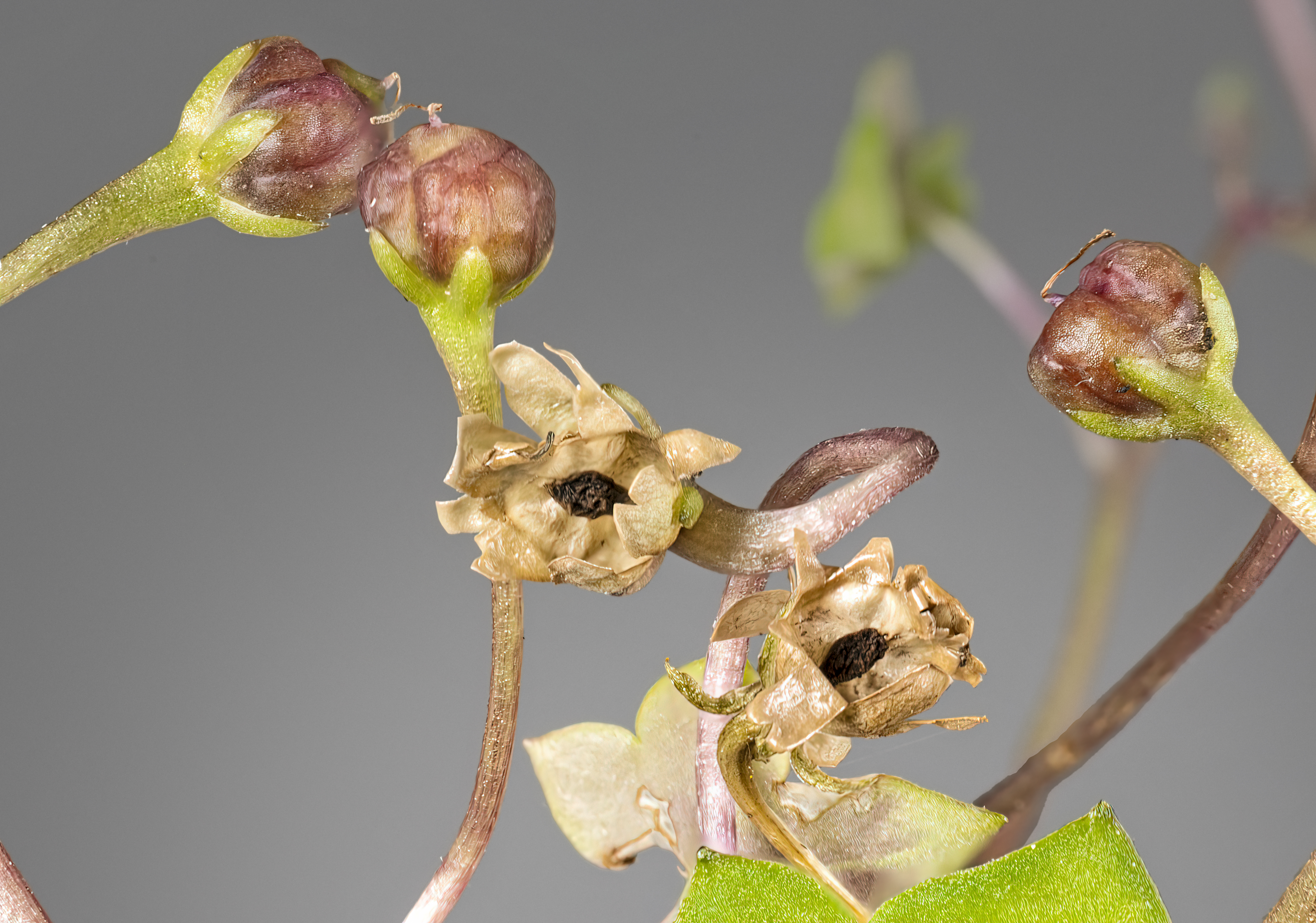
Fruit and seeds

Cymbalaria muralis has small flowers that strongly resemble those of a snapdragon. They have sepals at the base of the flower that have lobes 1.5–3 mm long and are sharply pointed. The petals form a closed tube 3–5 mm long. The lower lip of the flower expanded upwards to block the tube of the flower similarly to the well known snapdragon flowers (palate inflated). The two cushion shaped parts of the lip under the mouth have yellow spots. The lower lobes of the flower are spreading while the upper ones stand up, with rounded ends and 2–3 mm long. The majority of the flower is lilac with a yellow throat with darker lines on the upper lobes. Rarely the flowers may be all or nearly all white. At the rear of the flower there is a short spur about a third of the total length of the flower.

Flowering is dependent on local conditions. In Britain it may flower from May until the end of November, while in Eastern Europe it does so from June to July with seeds in September. In North America it may flower from May to October. In New Zealand it flowers all year long, from January to December.

The flowers are pollinated by bees, but are also self-compatible. Once a flower is fertilized it forms a globular capsule 3–5 mm in diameter. Each of the capsules has two openings, each with three valves. The seeds are quite small, just 0.5–1 mm with a crescent shape covered in minute warty bumps. This plant has an unusual method for planting its own seeds. The flower stalk is initially positively phototropic and moves towards the light. After fertilisation, it becomes negatively phototropic ("scototropic") and moves away from the light. This results in seed capsules being pushed into dark crevices of rock walls, where it is more likely to germinate.

== Taxonomy ==
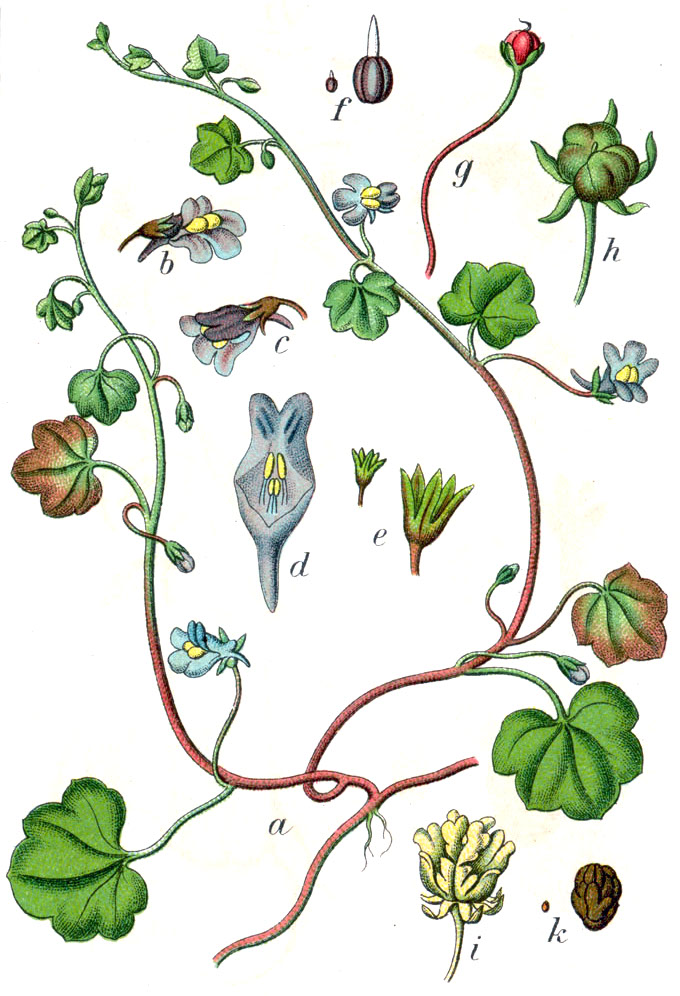
Cymbalaria muralis botanical illustration from Deutschlands Flora in Abbildungen, 1796

As with many plants, Cymbalaria muralis was given its first scientific name and description by the early taxonomist Carl Linnaeus. He placed it in the genus Antirrhinum with plants commonly called snapdragons in 1753 as Antirrhinum cymbalaria. Its taxonomic history since that date is quite complex with twenty-two species and five subspecies that are considered to be taxonomic synonyms as of 2024.

The very first is a reclassification in genus Linaria, the toadflaxes, as Linaria cymbalaria by the botanist Philip Miller in 1768. Four other names were published after this in Linaria that had acceptance for a time and Linaria cymbalaria continued to be used alongside other names as late as 1902.

A spelling variation (see Orthographical variant) created by the botanist Noël Martin Joseph de Necker 1773 when he spelled it Antirrhinum cimbalaria. The species was described and given a taxonomic superfluous name six years later in 1779 by the naturalist Jean-Baptiste Lamarck as Antirrhinum hederaceum. Likewise the botanist Richard Anthony Salisbury gave it a similar superfluous name, Antirrhinum hederifolium, in 1796. It was described four more times under different names in Antirrhinum in the 1800s.

It was described by Philipp Gottfried Gaertner, Bernhard Meyer, and Johannes Scherbius with a new classification as Cymbalaria muralis in 1800. As previously it was given six more variously incorrect names in genus Cymbalaria over the next 147 years.

Table of Synonyms
Name	Year	Rank	Synonym of:	Notes
Antirrhinum acutangulum Ten.	1820	species	subsp. muralis	= het.
Antirrhinum cimbalaria Neck.	1773	species	subsp. muralis	= het., orth. var.
Antirrhinum cymbalaria L.	1753	species	C. muralis	≡ hom.
Antirrhinum cymbalaria Sieber ex Benth.	1846	species	subsp. muralis	= het.
Antirrhinum hederaceum Lam.	1779	species	C. muralis	≡ hom., nom. superfl.
Antirrhinum hederifolium Salisb.	1796	species	C. muralis	≡ hom., nom. superfl.
Antirrhinum muralis (G.Gaertn., B.Mey. & Scherb.) Pers.	1806	species	C. muralis	≡ hom.
Antirrhinum quinquelobum Stokes	1812	species	subsp. muralis	= het.
Cymbalaria cymbalaria (L.) Wettst.	1891	species	C. muralis	≡ hom., not validly publ.
Cymbalaria flabellifer A.Chev.	1936	species	subsp. muralis	= het.
Cymbalaria gerbaultii A.Chev.	1936	species	subsp. muralis	= het.
Cymbalaria glechomifolia A.Chev.	1936	species	subsp. muralis	= het.
Cymbalaria globosa (Gerbault) A.Chev.	1936	species	subsp. muralis	= het.
Cymbalaria hederacea Gray	1821	species	C. muralis	≡ hom., nom. superfl.
Cymbalaria muralis f. toutonii (A.Chev.) Cufod.	1947	form	subsp. muralis	= het.
Cymbalaria muralis f. visianii Kümmerle ex Jáv.	1925	form	subsp. visianii	≡ hom.
Cymbalaria toutonii A.Chev.	1936	species	subsp. muralis	= het.
Cymbalaria vulgaris Raf.	1840	species	subsp. muralis	= het.
Elatine cymbalaria Moench	1794	species	subsp. muralis	= het.
Linaria acutangula Ten.	1831	species	subsp. muralis	= het.
Linaria cymbalaria (L.) Mill.	1768	species	C. muralis	≡ hom.
Linaria cymbalaria var. globosa Gerbault	1922	variety	subsp. muralis	= het.
Linaria cymbalaria var. heterophylla Gerbault	1917	variety	subsp. muralis	= het.
Linaria cymbalaria var. minor Goiran ex Fiori & Bég.	1902	variety	subsp. muralis	= het.
Linaria hederifolia Steud.	1821	species	subsp. muralis	= het.
Linaria hederifolia St.-Lag.	1889	species	subsp. muralis	= het.
Tursitis cymbalaria (L.) Raf.	1840	species	C. muralis	≡ hom.
Notes: ≡ homotypic synonym; = heterotypic synonym

As of 2024 Plants of the World Online (POWO), World Flora Online (WFO), and the Flora of North America, all list Cymbalaria muralis as the correct name for this species.

=== Subspecies ===
As of 2024 there are two widely accepted subspecies. The autonym Cymbalaria muralis subsp. muralis and Cymbalaria muralis subsp. visianii. In some sources Cymbalaria muralis subsp. pubescens continues to be listed as a valid subspecies, but it is not listed as valid by most sources.

==== Cymbalaria muralis subsp. muralis ====
This subspecies is hairless or nearly so in most parts. It is widespread and commonly encountered across much of the temperate world, see distribution for details.

==== Cymbalaria muralis subsp. visianii ====
This subspecies was first described in 1925 as Cymbalaria muralis f. visianii by Sándor Jávorka using an incomplete description by Jenő Béla Kümmerle. In 1972 the Irish botanist D. A. Webb described it with its current name making the distinction from Cymbalaria pilosa, which as of 2024 is regarded as a synonym of Sibthorpia europaea by POWO. All parts of the plants are covered in fine hairs (villous) except for the seed pods, which are hairless.

=== Names ===
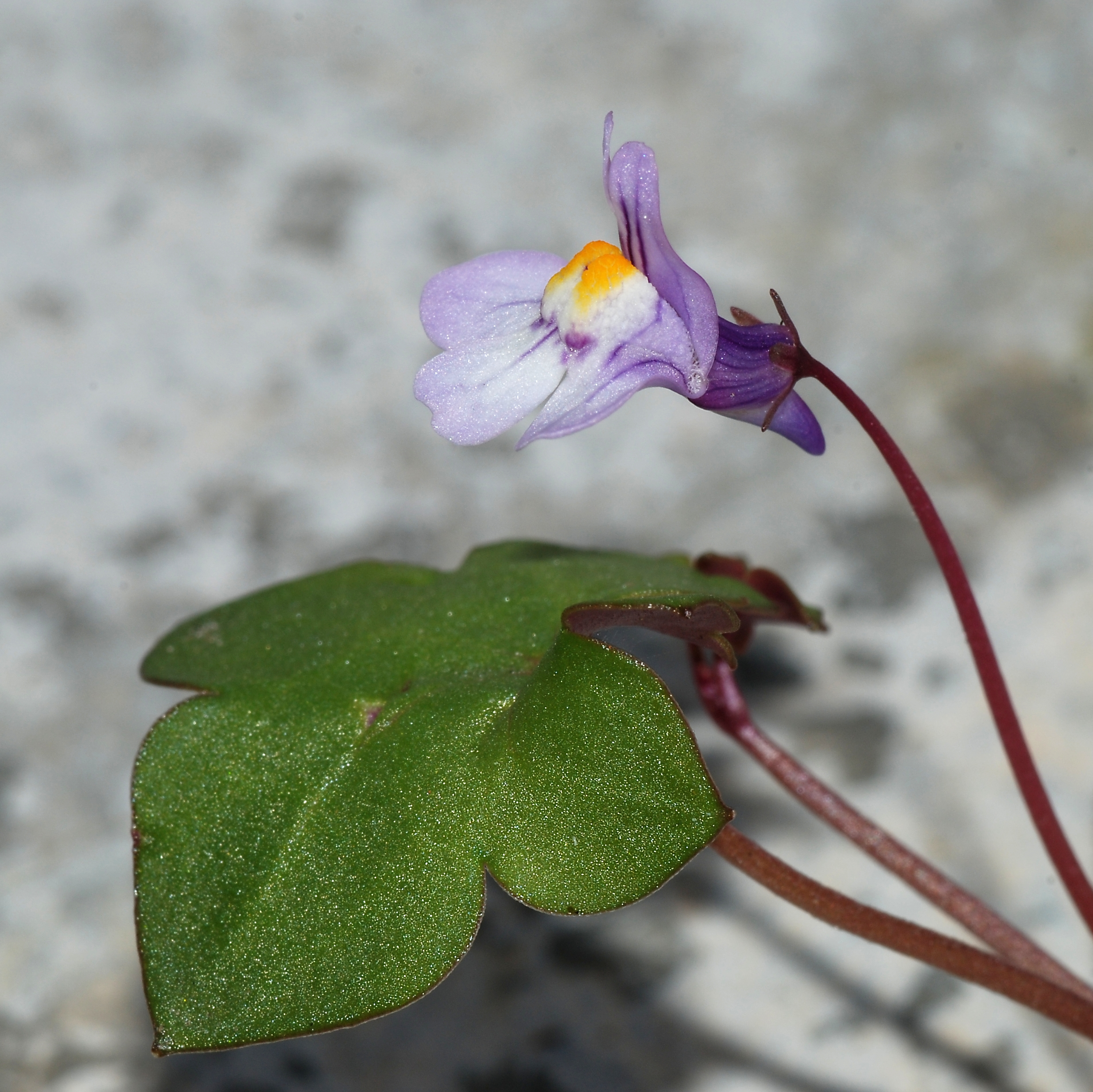
Cymbalaria muralis flower side view

The species name muralis comes from the Latin "mūrālis" for walls and relating to them, from its habit of growing on them.

One of its most frequent common names in English, "ivy-leaved toadflax", is a compound name that describes the appearance of the plant. The leaves of the species are similar shape to those of ivy. Its flowers are similar to those of the closely related genus Linaria, which is called toadflax because it is a frequent weed of flax grown as a crop, and the flowers reminded people of a toad's mouth.

Related to its habit of growing on ruins, it was also called "coliseum ivy", a name that was first recorded in 1864. From its first location of introduction in England it was also called "Oxford ivy" and was previously called "Oxford weed". The common name "Kenilworth ivy" is speculated to come from the English town of Kenilworth or the castle of the same name which is near where the plant first appeared in England in the 1600s. Other less common names related to its ivy-like appearance include "ivy-weed", "ivy-wort", and "Kentucky-ivy". The common name "mother of thousands" has been applied to this species and also to Saxifraga stolonifera, Tolmiea menziesii, and Soleirolia soleirolii. It has also been called "pennywort", but this name is shared with many other vaguely round leafed herbaceous plants. Less common names shared with other plants include "cancer root" (with Conopholis americana and Epifagus virginiana), and "wandering sailor" (with genus Lysimachia), and "Wandering Jew" (with Saxifraga stolonifera and Tradescantia fluminensis). Two other nautical names include "climbing sailor" and "roving sailor". It has also been called "pedlar's basket", "rabbits", "roving Jenny", and "Devil's ribbon".

== Distribution ==
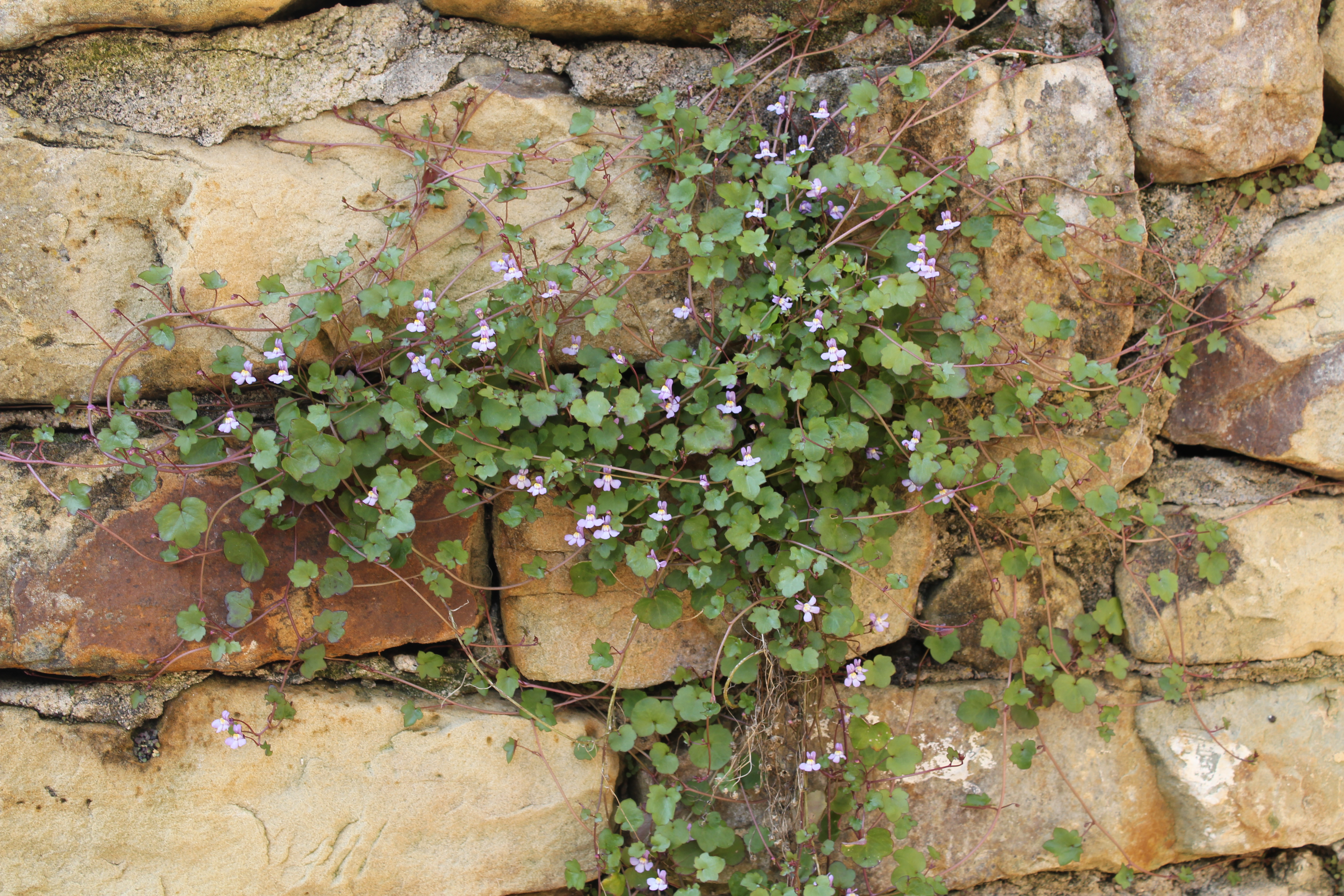
Cymbalaria muralis growing on a wall

POWO regards the native range for this species to be limited to southern Europe, in Austria, France, Italy, Switzerland, and the former Yugoslavia, with the nominate subspecies Cymbalaria muralis subsp. muralis also occurring throughout this range. Similarly the World Plants database records it as native to the same areas, but more specifically to Slovenia, Croatia, Bosnia & Hercegovina, Serbia, and Kosovo in the former Yugoslavia and to the small state of San Marino on the Italian peninsula. It also shows it as native to additional areas north east of the Alps such as the Czech Republic, Slovakia and Liechtenstein, and many Atlantic Ocean islands such as the Azores, Madeira, the Canary Islands, and the Cape Verde Islands.

Cymbalaria muralis subsp. visianii recorded by POWO as growing in the southeastern part of the species' range, only in Italy and the former Yugoslavia. The World Plants database largely agrees listing it as native to the central and southern parts of Italy and to Croatia, but also listing it as introduced in Germany; it has also been recorded as naturalised in Britain since 1970.

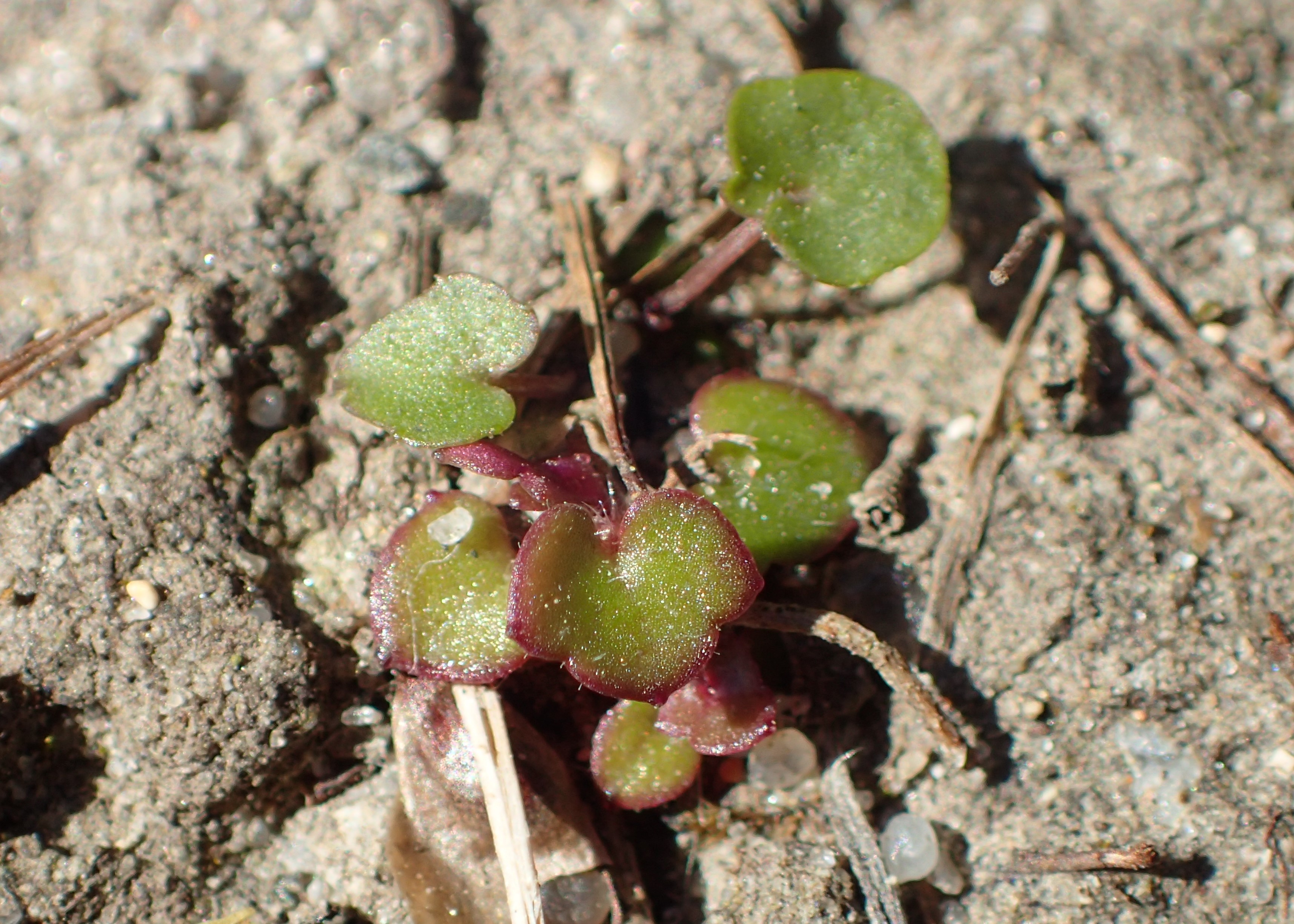
Cymbalaria muralis seedling in the Berlin Botanical Gardens

From this original range it spread to much of Europe and to the rest of the world as either an accidental introduction or because of its use as an ornamental plant. Its first record outside of cultivation in Great Britain is from 1640. A frequently repeated story is that the plants were introduced accidentally as part of a shipment of statuary to Oxford. However, this is unlikely since it was recorded growing in an English garden in 1617 in Droxford. Thereafter it became a popular ornamental plant that was widely planted in the United Kingdom through the 19th century. Regardless of its status it is recorded from Ireland and Portugal in the west in every country as far east as Ukraine, Poland, and Sweden, and according to POWO it may also be found in the Baltic States, northwestern Russia, and the North Caucasus with World Plants recording it in Belarus and Georgia.

In Africa it grows in Morocco, Algeria, and Tunisia in the north and in South Africa it grows in the Cape Provinces and the Northern Provinces floristic areas. In Asia it is now found in Turkey, Jordan, North Korea, South Korea, and the eastern Himalayas.

In North America Cymbalaria muralis has been recorded growing outside cultivation in Bermuda, Canada, Costa Rica, Guatemala, Honduras, Jamaica, Mexico, and the United States. In the USA it is generally agreed that it grows in much of the Midwest, north-east, and New England as far south as South Carolina, Tennessee, and Arkansas and as far west as Wisconsin, Illinois, and Missouri with the exception of Maine and New Hampshire. It is also found on the west coast in California, Oregon, and Washington State. It is more scattered in the interior states, listed as growing in Colorado, Nebraska, South Dakota, and Utah, with the last of these recorded by USDA Natural Resources Conservation Service PLANTS database (PLANTS) and World Plants, but not POWO. In Canada it agreed that it grows in five provinces, British Columbia, Manitoba, New Brunswick, Ontario, and Québec. However PLANTS and World Plants also record it in Nova Scotia while POWO alone records it on the island of Newfoundland.

In South America it has been observed in Colombia, Ecuador, and Peru in the north. It has also been recorded in the south and southeast of Brazil, Uruguay, Bolivia, and the north of Argentina. In mainland Chile it has been reported from Valparaíso, in Santiago, the Maule Region, and the Biobío Region.

On oceanic islands it has been introduced to Maui in Hawaii, both the North and South Island of New Zealand, Bermuda, Mauritius, St. Helena, and the Juan Fernández Islands. It is also found in six Australian states, Western Australia, South Australia, Victoria, New South Wales, the south of Queensland, and the island state of Tasmania.

== Habitat ==
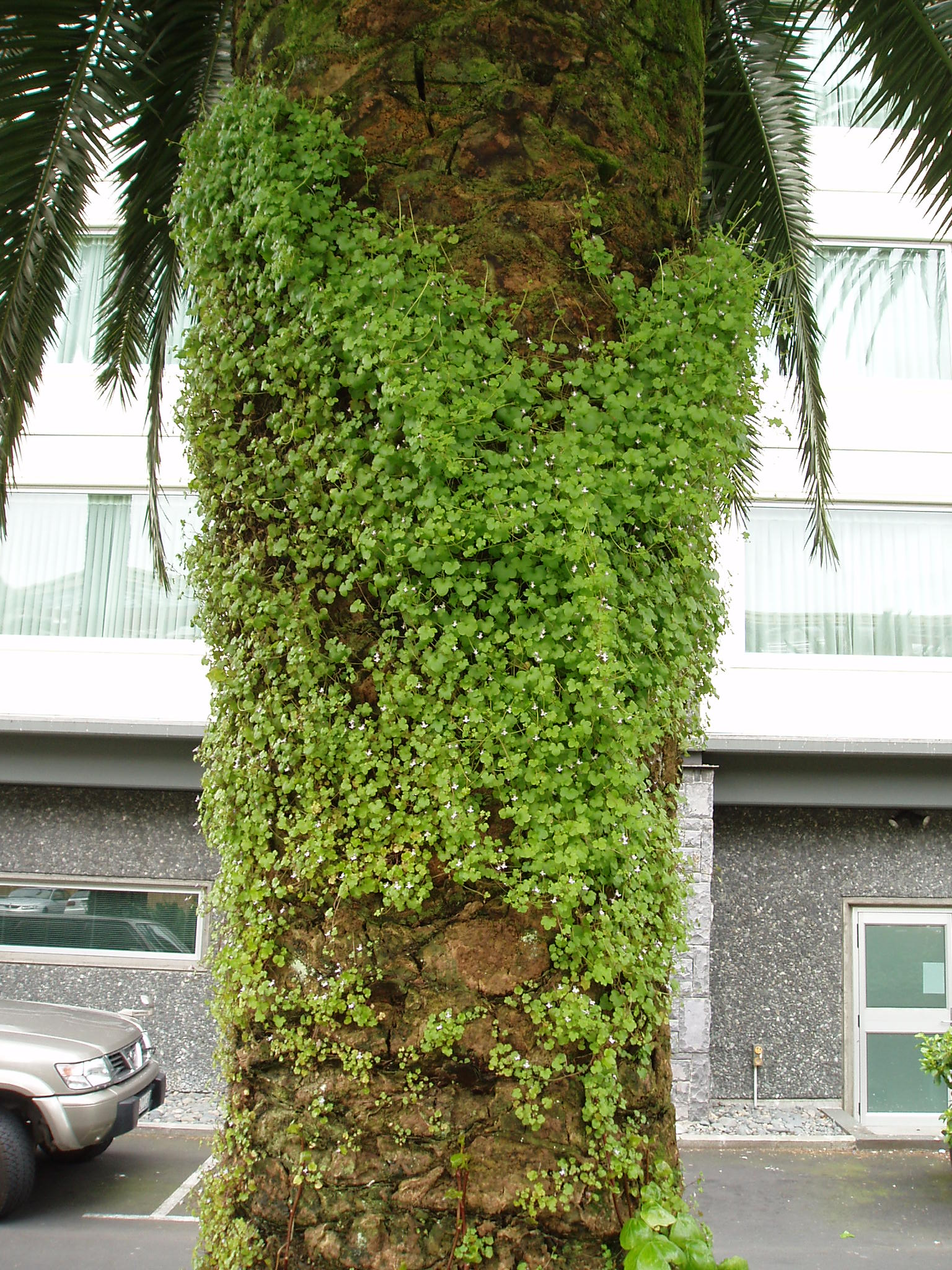
Epiphytic upon the trunk of a palm tree, Auckland, NZ

The original habitat for Cymbalaria muralis was narrow niches in rock faces and cliffs. In cooler climates like Lower Silesia in Poland it grows in warm microclimates such as on south or west facing walls of structures or the embankments of rivers. It is considered very characteristic of the vegetation that grows on walls.

In hot climates it becomes a high altitude specialist, for example growing from 1100–1300 m in elevation in Costa Rica.

== Ecology ==
Cymbalaria muralis is a generalist, attracting a wide range of pollinators, including bees, flies, and butterflies. Their roots are associated with arbuscular mycorrhiza, a group of fungi that partner with plants.

At least three aphid species Myzus ornatus (violet aphid), Myzus persicae (green peach aphid), and Myzus cymbalariae are commonly found on Cymbalaria muralis. The last of these was first observed feeding on ivy-leaved toadflax and is named for the species. The plant is also a host for tomato ringspot virus.

== Uses ==
=== Edibility ===
Ivy-leaved toadflax is sometimes used as a salad green in Southern Europe. Its taste is described as like raw garden peas or bitter with a sharp numbing sensation, however it has also been noted as slightly toxic by researchers Marion Cooper and Anthony Johnson.

=== Cultivation ===
In gardens ivy-leaved toadflax is planted as a groundcover, particularly on rocky slopes, and planted in wall cracks. Once established it will reproduce on its own, both from seeding and stems rooting themselves. It is winter hardy in USDA zones 5 to 9. According to the garden author Carolyn Singer it is deer resistant.
