= Dactylocardamum =

Scientific classification
- Kingdom: Plantae
- Clade: Tracheophytes
- Clade: Angiosperms
- Clade: Eudicots
- Clade: Rosids
- Order: Brassicales
- Family: Brassicaceae
- Genus: Dactylocardamum; Al-Shehbaz
- Species: D. imbricatifolium

Binomial name
- Dactylocardamum imbricatifolium Al-Shehbaz

Genus of flowering plants

Dactylocardamum is a genus of flowering plants belonging to the family Brassicaceae. It includes a single species, Dactylocardamum imbricatifolium, a subshrub endemic to Ancash region of Peru.

Dactylocardamum polyspermum was formerly placed in this genus, but is now placed in genus Ancashia as Ancashia polysperma.
