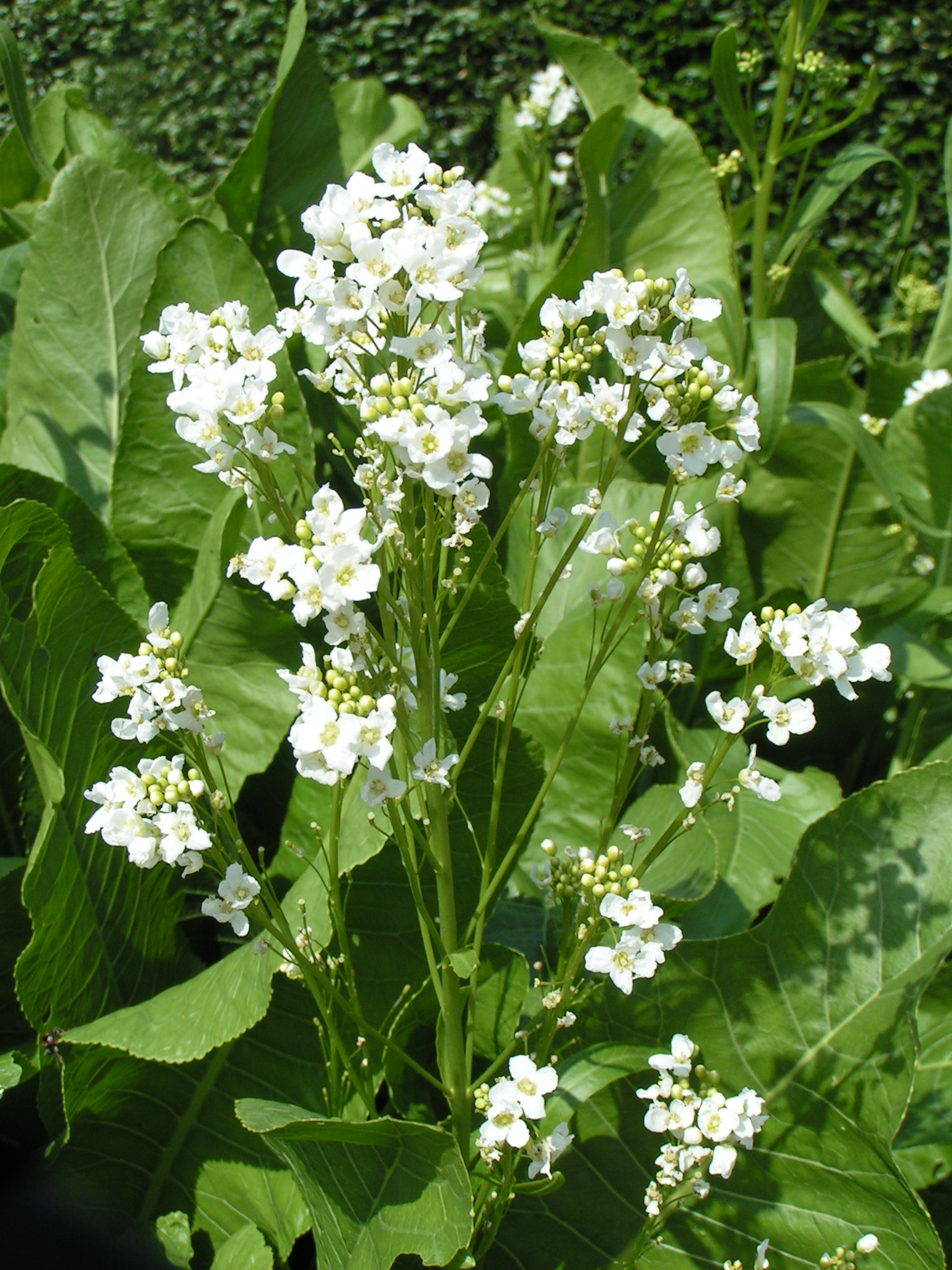
- Armoracia rusticana in bloom

Scientific classification
- Kingdom: Plantae
- Clade: Tracheophytes
- Clade: Angiosperms
- Clade: Eudicots
- Clade: Rosids
- Order: Brassicales
- Family: Brassicaceae
- Genus: Armoracia; G.Gaertn., B.Mey. & Scherb.

Species
- See text

Synonyms
- Raphanis Dodoens ex Moench

= Armoracia =

Genus of flowering plants

Armoracia is a genus of flowering plants of the family Brassicaceae, native to the Palaearctic. Its best known member is horseradish, Armoracia rusticana, which is the type species.

== Species ==
Many species have been described, but most have ended up synonymized. Plants of the World Online accepts three species.

- Armoracia macrocarpa (Waldst. & Kit.) Kit. ex Baumg.
- Armoracia rusticana P.Gaertn., B.Mey. & Scherb.
- Armoracia sisymbrioides (DC.) N.Busch ex Ganesh
