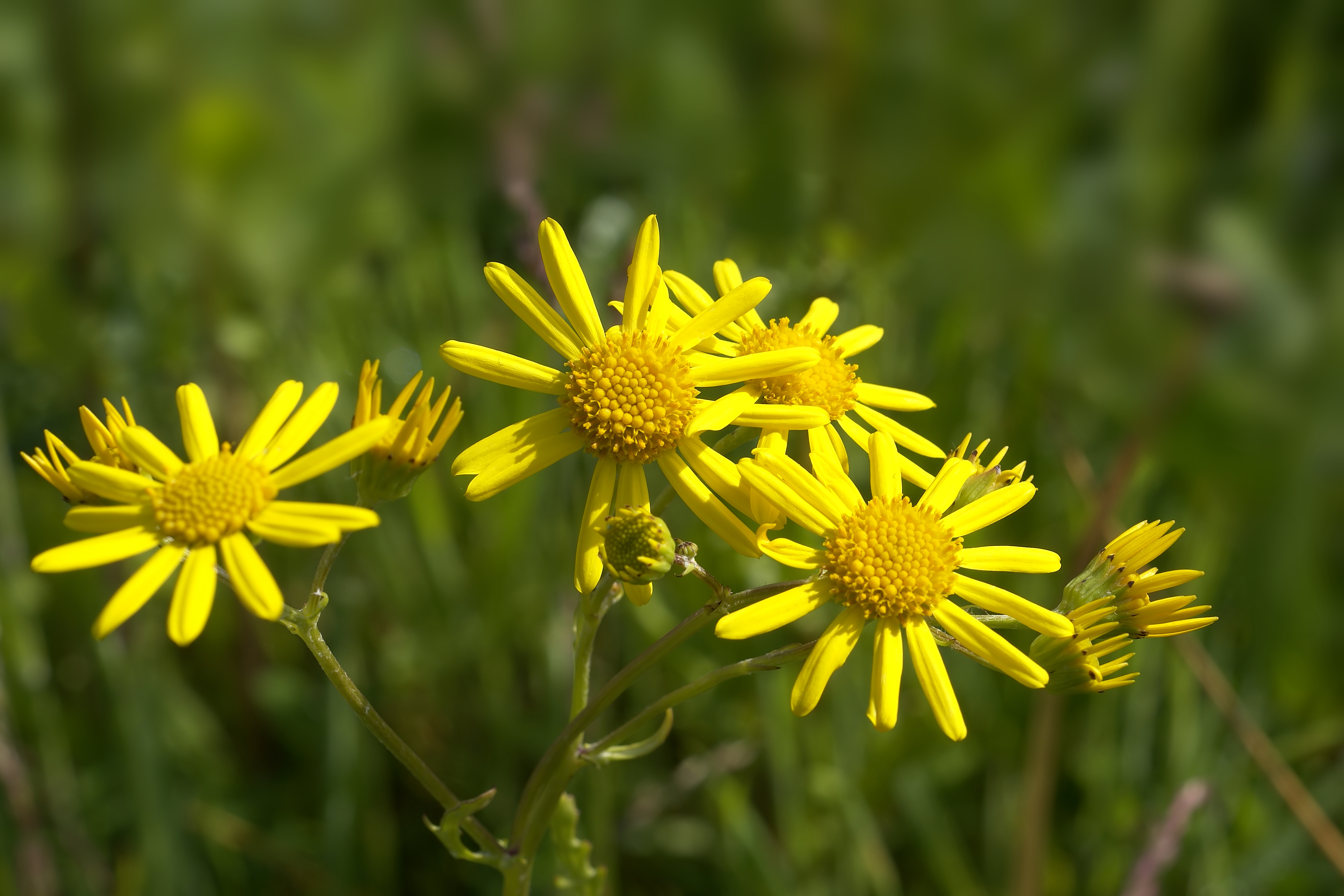

Scientific classification
- Kingdom: Plantae
- Clade: Tracheophytes
- Clade: Angiosperms
- Clade: Eudicots
- Clade: Asterids
- Order: Asterales
- Family: Asteraceae
- Genus: Jacobaea
- Species: J. aquatica

Binomial name
- Jacobaea aquatica (Hill) G.Gaertn., B.Mey. & Scherb.

Synonyms
- Senecio aquaticus Hill; Senecio jacobaea subsp. barbareifolius Krock.; Senecio pratensis Richt.

= Jacobaea aquatica =

Species of flowering plant in the daisy family

Jacobaea aquatica or Senecio aquaticus, the water ragwort or marsh ragwort, is a plant of the family Asteraceae. It is a perennial or biennial plant: young plants form a rosette near the ground, eventually producing a taller flowering shoot with many bright yellow flower heads, each with prominent ray florets. It grows in damp, grazed grassland, especially where there has been some disturbance.

== Biogeography ==
Jacobaea aquatica is endemic to Europe. It may be found throughout the continent, except Finland and Eastern Europe. There are small populations in the European part of Turkey and on Svalbard.
