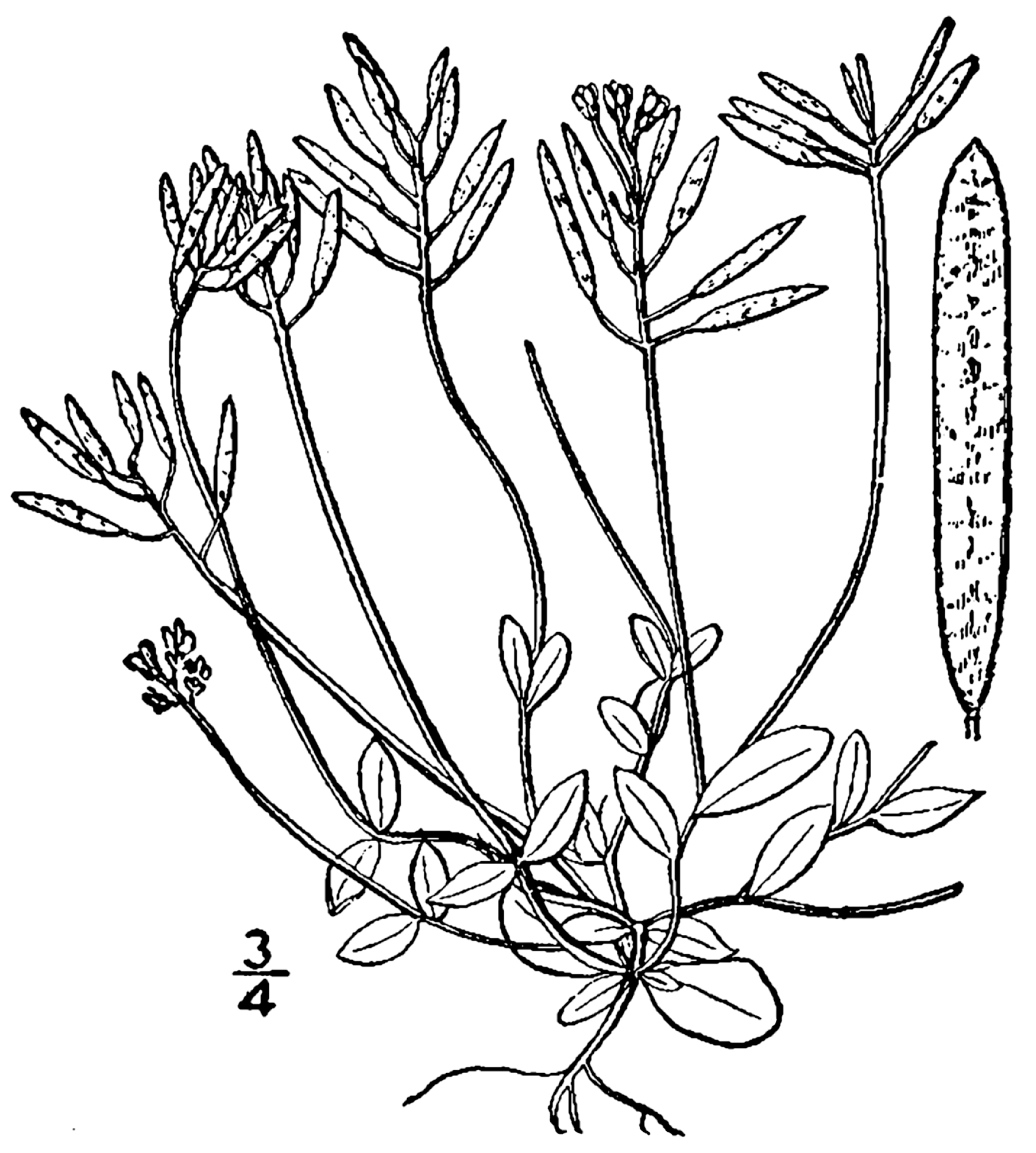

Scientific classification
- Kingdom: Plantae
- Clade: Tracheophytes
- Clade: Angiosperms
- Clade: Eudicots
- Clade: Rosids
- Order: Brassicales
- Family: Brassicaceae
- Genus: Tomostima
- Species: T. reptans

Binomial name
- Tomostima reptans (Lam.) Al-Shehbaz, M.Koch & Jordon-Thaden

Synonyms
- Arabis reptans Lam. (1783) (basionym); Arabis rotundifolia Raf.; Draba bifolia Muhl.; Draba caroliniana Walter; Draba caroliniana f. andrenae O.E.Schulz; Draba caroliniana var. dolichocarpa O.E.Schulz; Draba caroliniana var. hunteri Payson & H.St.John; Draba caroliniana var. micrantha (Nutt.) A.Gray; Draba caroliniana f. stellifera O.E.Schulz; Draba caroliniana subsp. stellifera (O.E.Schulz) Payson & H.St.John; Draba caroliniana subsp. typica Payson & H.St.John; Draba caroliniana var. umbellata Torr. & A.Gray; Draba coloradensis Rydb.; Draba filicaulis Scheele; Draba hispidula Michx.; Draba micrantha Nutt.; Draba reptans (Lam.) Fernald; Draba reptans f. hunteri (Payson & H.St.John) C.L.Hitchc.; Draba reptans var. micrantha (Nutt.) Fernald; Draba reptans f. micrantha (Nutt.) C.L.Hitchc.; Draba reptans var. stellifera (O.E.Schulz) C.L.Hitchc.; Draba reptans subsp. stellifera (O.E.Schulz) Abrams; Draba umbellata Muhl.; Tomostima caroliniana (Walter) Nieuwl.; Tomostima hispidula (Michx.) Raf.; Tomostima micranthum (Nutt.) Lunell

= Tomostima reptans =

Species of flowering plant

Tomostima reptans (synonym Draba reptans), common names Carolina draba, Carolina whitlow-grass, Creeping whitlow-grass, and Whitlow-grass, is an annual plant in the family Brassicaceae that is native to temperate North America.

It is native to most of the contiguous United States, except for Florida, Mississippi, Kentucky, Virginia, Maryland, Delaware, and northern New England; to Ontario, Manitoba, Saskatchewan, Alberta, and British Columbia in Canada; and to northwestern Mexico.

== Conservation status in the United States ==
It is listed as a special concern in Connecticut, as threatened in Michigan, New York, and Ohio, as endangered in New Jersey, as extirpated in Pennsylvania, and as historical in Rhode Island.

== Native American ethnobotany ==
The Ramah Navajo apply a poultice of the crushed leaves of the plant to sores.

== Taxonomy ==
The species was first described as Arabis reptans by Jean-Baptiste Lamarck in 1783. In 1934 Merritt Lyndon Fernald placed the species in genus Draba as D. reptans. In 2012 Ihsan Ali Al-Shehbaz, Marcus Koch, and I. Jordon-Thaden placed it in genus Tomostima as T. reptans.
