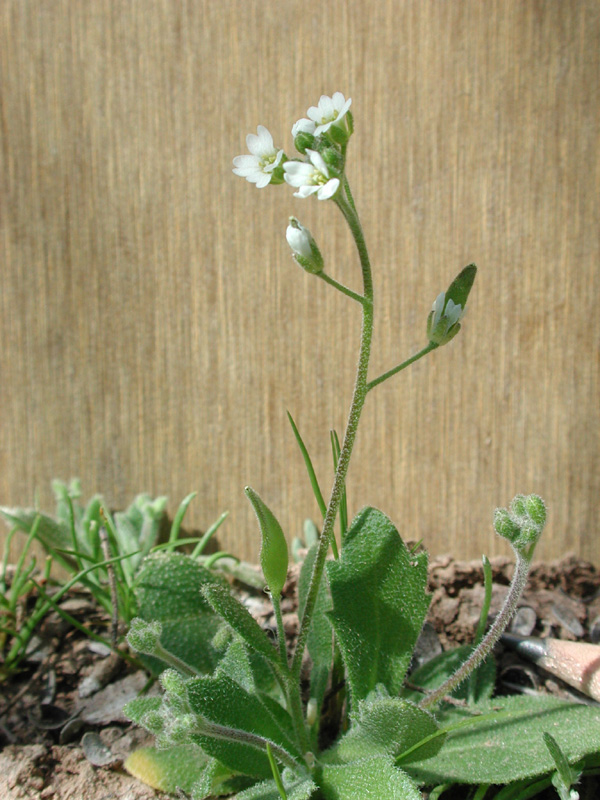

Scientific classification
- Kingdom: Plantae
- Clade: Tracheophytes
- Clade: Angiosperms
- Clade: Eudicots
- Clade: Rosids
- Order: Brassicales
- Family: Brassicaceae
- Tribe: Arabideae
- Genus: Tomostima
- Species: T. cuneifolia

Binomial name
- Tomostima cuneifolia (Nutt.) Al-Shehbaz, M.Koch & Jordon-Thaden

Synonyms
- Draba ammophila A.Heller; Draba cuneifolia Nutt. (1838) (basionym); Draba cuneifolia var. foliosa Mohlenbr.; Draba cuneifolia var. helleri (Small) O.E.Schulz; Draba cuneifolia var. integrifolia S.Watson; Draba cuneifolia var. leiocarpa O.E.Schulz; Draba helleri Small; Draba integrifolia (S.Watson) Greene; Draba sonorae var. integrifolia (S.Watson) O.E.Schulz

= Tomostima cuneifolia =

Species of flowering plant

Tomostima cuneifolia (synonym Draba cuneifolia) is a species of flowering plant in the family Brassicaceae known as the wedgeleaf draba or wedgeleaf whitlow-grass. This annual plant is native to the southern United States and northern Mexico where it grows in open, rocky fields and other disturbed areas. The plant forms a basal cluster of leaves, which are thick, widely toothed, and coated in stiff hairs. It bolts one or more erect stems which may approach 40 centimeters in maximum height. Each hairy stem bears an inflorescence of up to 75 small white flowers that continue at intervals down the stem as the stem grows in height. This family and its plants are easy to identify with its 4 petals and 4 sepals arranged like a "cross", either in an "X" or "H" shape, thus the name "Cruciferae". Mustards have 6 stamens usually 4 are taller and 2 are shorter. Fruits are either a long thin silique or short often rounded silicle.

== Distribution ==
Tomostima cuneifolia is found throughout the southern United States, Baja California and northern Mexico.

== Conservation status ==
The State of Illinois has listed Draba cuneifolia, Whitlow Grass as Endangered: The State of Ohio has listed Draba cuneifolia, Wedge-leaf Whitlow-grass as Threatened; The State of Kentucky has listed Draba cuneifolia, Wedge-leaf Whitlow-grass as Endangered; and The State of Tennessee has listed Draba cuneifolia, Wedge-leaved Whitlow-grass as a species of Special Concern.

== Lookalikes ==
Other species of Draba and Tomostima; more broadly, small species of Cardamine and other springtime mustards.

== Taxonomy ==
The species was first described as Draba cuneifolia by Thomas Nuttall in 1838. In 2012 Ihsan Ali Al-Shehbaz, Marcus Albert Koch, and I. Jordon-Thaden placed the species in genus Tomostima as T. cuneifolia.
