= Scherbius =

Scherbius is a surname. Notable people with the surname include:

- Arthur Scherbius (1878–1929), German electrical engineer, inventor, and pioneer
- Johannes Scherbius (1769–1813), German physician and botanist
