= Metashangrilaia =

Scientific classification
- Kingdom: Plantae
- Clade: Tracheophytes
- Clade: Angiosperms
- Clade: Eudicots
- Clade: Rosids
- Order: Brassicales
- Family: Brassicaceae
- Tribe: Euclidieae
- Genus: Metashangrilaia; Al-Shehbaz & D.A.German
- Species: M. forrestii

Binomial name
- Metashangrilaia forrestii (W.W.Sm.) Al-Shehbaz & D.A.German

Synonyms
- Braya forrestii W.W.Sm.; Braya forrestii var. puberula W.T.Wang

Genus of flowering plants

Metashangrilaia is a genus of flowering plants in the family Brassicaceae. It includes a single species, Metashangrilaia forrestii, a perennial or subshrub native to subalpine regions of the eastern Himalayas, from Bhutan to eastern Tibet, Arunachal Pradesh, and Sichuan and Yunnan provinces of south-central China.

The species was first described as Braya forestii by William Wright Smith in 1913. In 2016 Ihsan Ali Al-Shehbaz and Dmitry A. German placed it in the new monotypic genus Metashangrilaia as Metashangrilaia forrestii.
