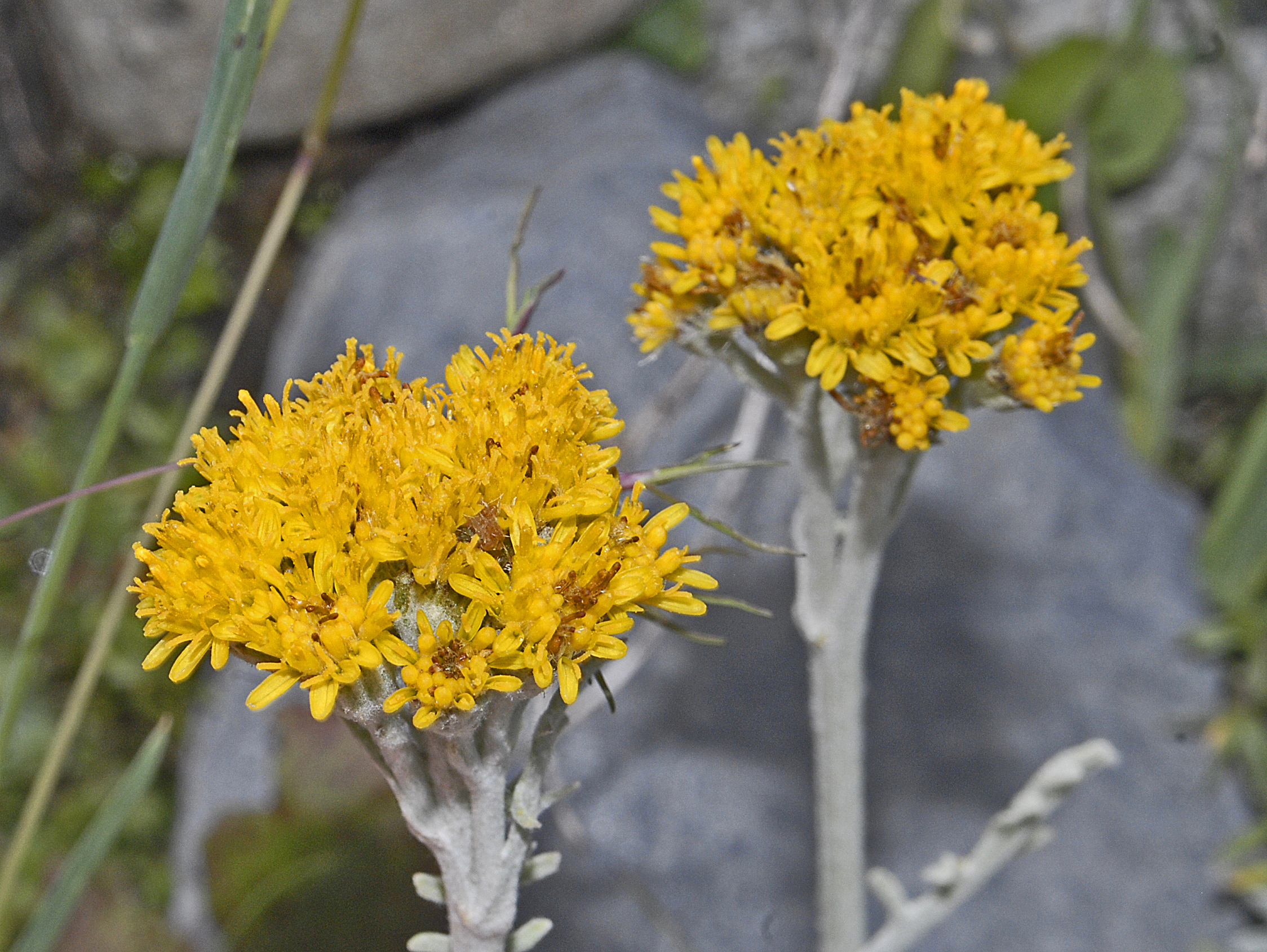
- Flowers of Jacobaea incana subsp. carniolica at the Giardino Botanico Alpino Chanousia

Scientific classification
- Kingdom: Plantae
- Clade: Tracheophytes
- Clade: Angiosperms
- Clade: Eudicots
- Clade: Asterids
- Order: Asterales
- Family: Asteraceae
- Genus: Jacobaea
- Species: J. incana

Binomial name
- Jacobaea incana (L.) Veldkamp

Synonyms
- Senecio incanus L.; Senecio corymbosus Dalla Torre; Senecio incanus subsp. incanus; Senecio incanus var. parviflorus (All.) Rouy; Senecio incanus ssp. carniolicus (Willd.) Braun-Blanq.; Senecio carniolicus Willd.

= Jacobaea incana =

Species of flowering plant

Jacobaea incana, the grey ragwort, is a species of Jacobaea in the family Asteraceae.

== Description ==
Jacobaea incana can reach a height of 5–15 centimetres (2.0–5.9 in). This perennial herbaceous plant has a short stem and basal leaves arranged in a rosette. They are silver-gray green, thin, spatulate to broadly ovate, pinnate and hairy. This plant produces corymbs of yellow to orange-yellow flowers of about 13–14 millimetres (0.51–0.55 in). They bloom from June to August.

== Distribution ==
This species is widespread in the Eastern Alps to the Apennines and the Carpathians.

== Habitat ==
Grey ragwort can be found on stony meadows, on rocky places and moraines at elevation of 1,700–2,600 metres (5,600–8,500 ft) above sea level.

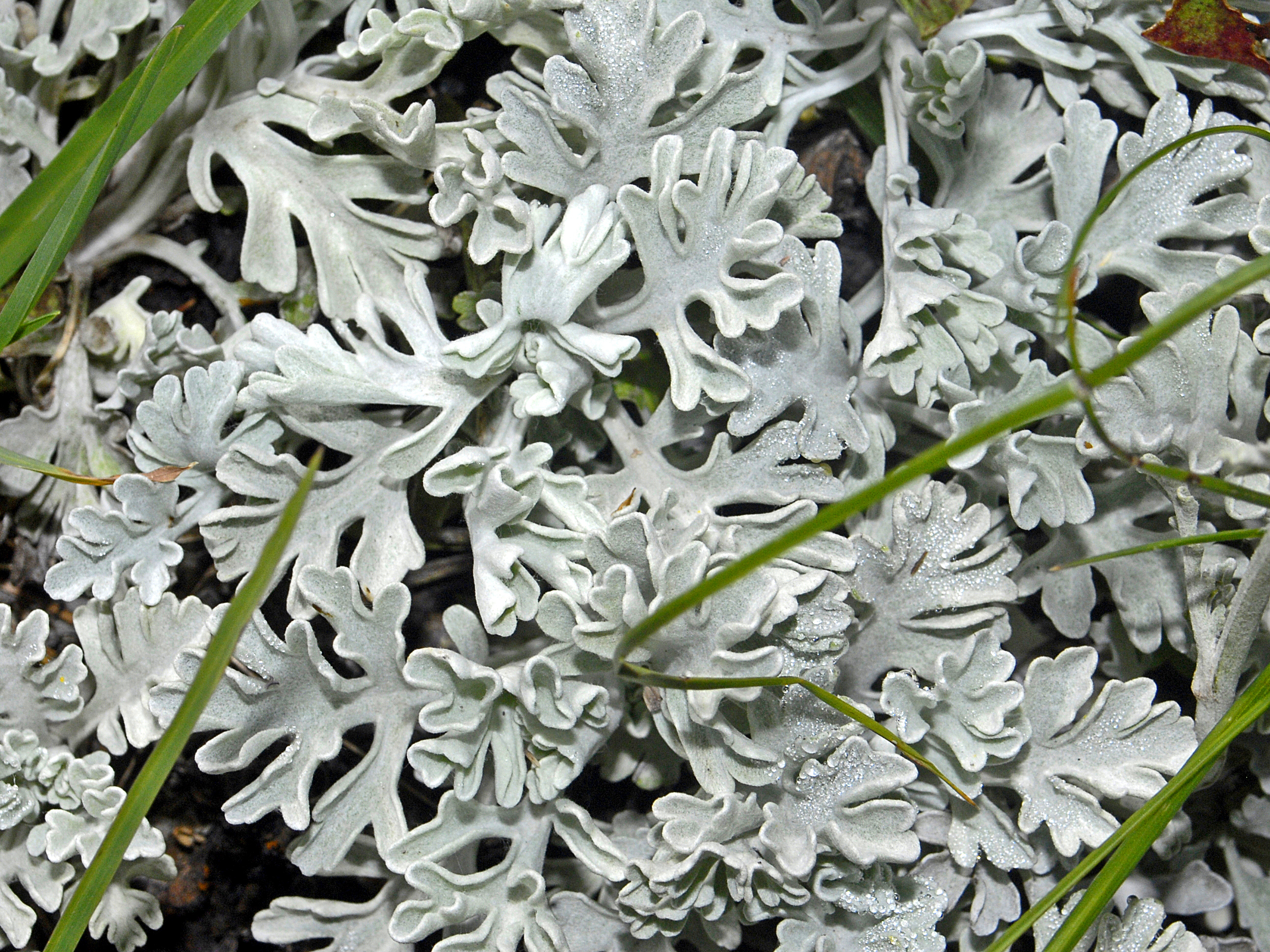
Leaves
