= Ancashia =

Scientific classification
- Kingdom: Plantae
- Clade: Tracheophytes
- Clade: Angiosperms
- Clade: Eudicots
- Clade: Rosids
- Order: Brassicales
- Family: Brassicaceae
- Tribe: Eudemeae
- Genus: Ancashia; Al-Shehbaz, Salariato, A.Cano & Zuloaga

Genus of flowering plants

Ancashia is a genus of flowering plants in the family Brassicaceae. It includes four species of perennials or subshrubs native to the Andes mountains of Bolivia and Peru.

== Species ==
Four species are accepted.

- Ancashia alpaminae (Gilg & Muschl.) Al-Shehbaz, Salariato, A.Cano & Zuloaga – central Peru
- Ancashia gamosepala (Al-Shehbaz) Al-Shehbaz, Salariato, A.Cano & Zuloaga – Peru (Junín) to western Bolivia
- Ancashia polysperma (Al-Shehbaz, A.Cano & Trinidad) Al-Shehbaz, Salariato, A.Cano & Zuloaga – central Peru
- Ancashia smithii (Al-Shehbaz) Al-Shehbaz, Salariato, A.Cano & Zuloaga – central Peru
