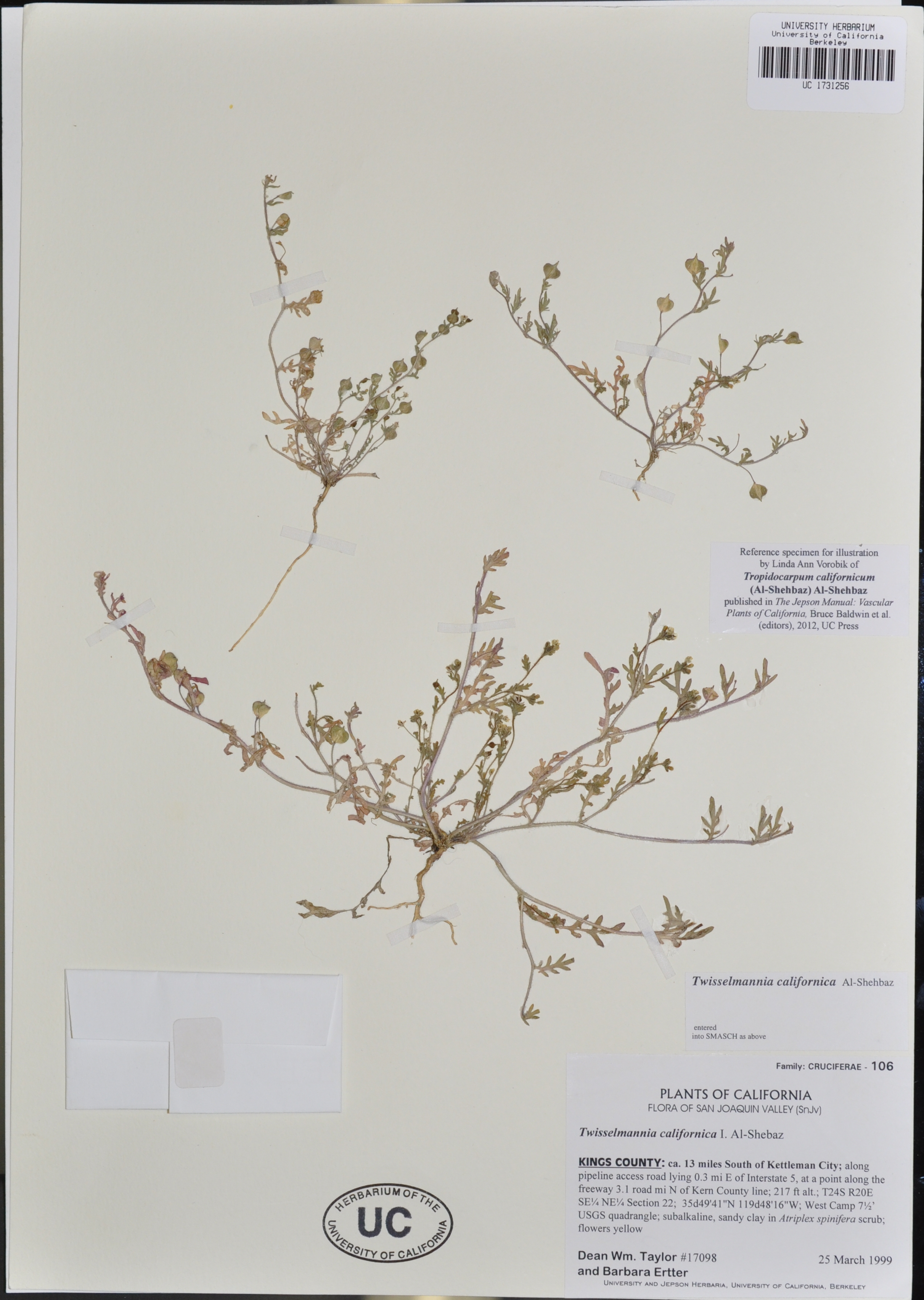

Conservation status
- Critically Imperiled (NatureServe)

Scientific classification
- Kingdom: Plantae
- Clade: Tracheophytes
- Clade: Angiosperms
- Clade: Eudicots
- Clade: Rosids
- Order: Brassicales
- Family: Brassicaceae
- Genus: Tropidocarpum
- Species: T. californicum

Binomial name
- Tropidocarpum californicum (Al-Shehbaz) Al-Shehbaz

Synonyms
- Twisselmannia californica Al-Shehbaz

= Tropidocarpum californicum =

Species of flowering plant

Tropidocarpum californicum, the king's gold, is a plant species endemic to a small region in California. It is known from only Kern and King counties in the southern part of the San Joaquin Valley.

Tropidocarpum californicum is an ascending or decumbent herb up to 25 cm tall. Leaves are up to 6 cm long, getting smaller the further up the stem. Flowers are yellow. fruits triangular.
