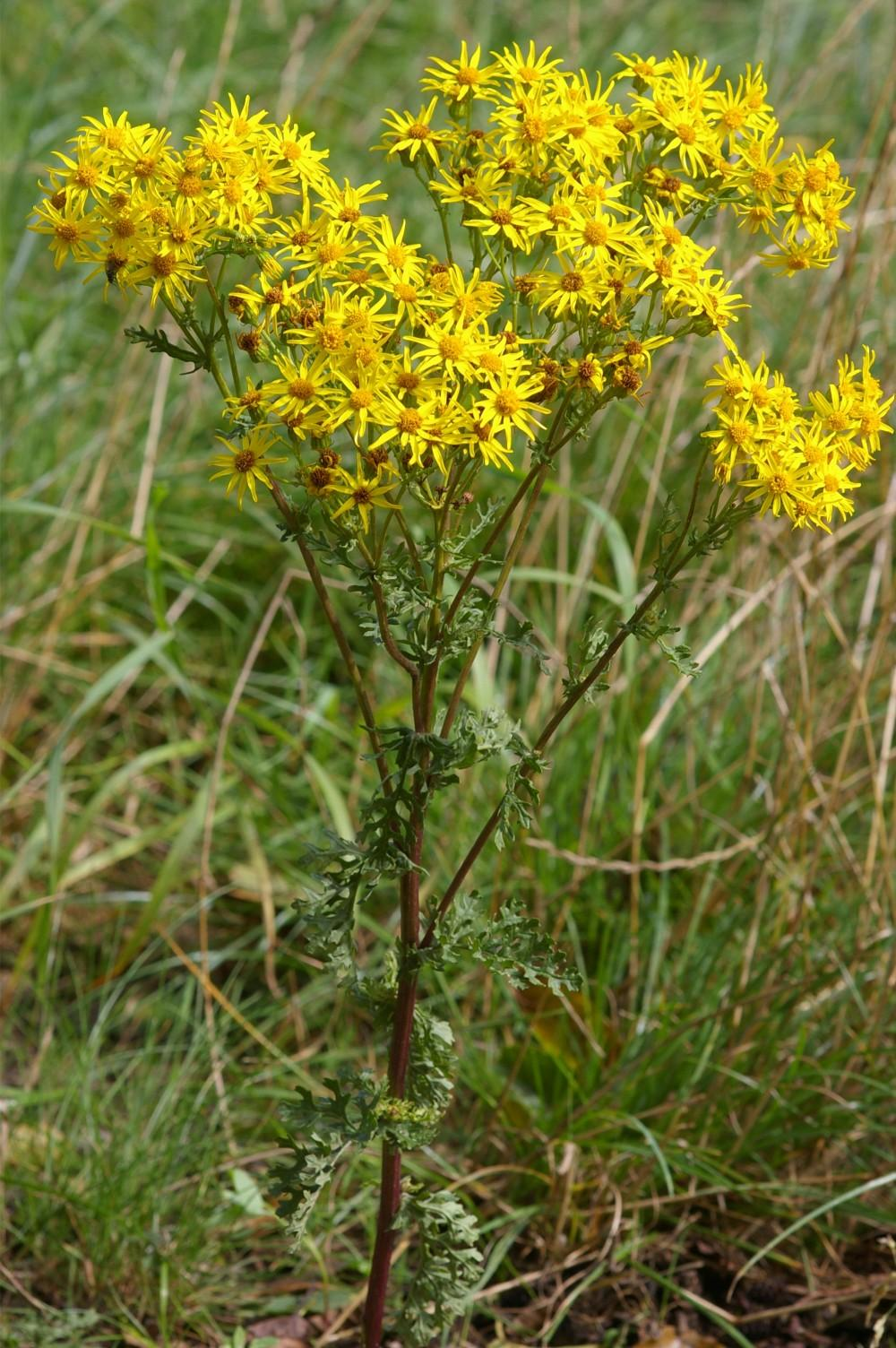
- Jacobaea vulgaris

Scientific classification
- Kingdom: Plantae
- Clade: Tracheophytes
- Clade: Angiosperms
- Clade: Eudicots
- Clade: Asterids
- Order: Asterales
- Family: Asteraceae
- Subfamily: Asteroideae
- Tribe: Senecioneae
- Genus: Jacobaea; Mill.

Type species
- Jacobaea vulgaris Gaertn.

= Jacobaea =

Genus of flowering plants in the daisy family

Jacobaea is a genus of flowering plants in the tribe Senecioneae and the family Asteraceae. Its members used to be placed in the genus Senecio, but have been separated into the segregate genus Jacobaea on the basis of molecular phylogenetics in order to maintain genera that are monophyletic.

== Species ==
The following species are recognised by The Plant List:

- Jacobaea abrotanifolia (L.) Moench
- Jacobaea adonidifolia (Loisel.) Pelser & Veldkamp
- Jacobaea alpina (L.) Moench
- Jacobaea ambigua (Biv.) Pelser & Veldkamp
- Jacobaea andrzejowskyi (Tzvelev) B.Nord. & Greuter
- Jacobaea aquatica (Hill) G.Gaertn., B.Mey. & Scherb.
- Jacobaea argunensis (Turcz.) B.Nord.
- Jacobaea arnautorum (Velen.) Pelser
- Jacobaea auricula (Bourg. ex Coss.) Pelser
- Jacobaea boissieri (DC.) Pelser
- Jacobaea borysthenica (DC.) B.Nord. & Greuter
- Jacobaea buschiana (Sosn.) B.Nord. & Greuter
- Jacobaea candida (C.Presl) B.Nord. & Greuter
- Jacobaea cannabifolia (Less.) E.Wiebe
- Jacobaea cilicia (Boiss.) B.Nord.
- Jacobaea delphiniifolia (Vahl) Pelser & Veldkamp
- Jacobaea erratica (Bertol.) Fourr.
- Jacobaea erucifolia (L.) P.Gaertn., B.Mey. & Schreb.
- Jacobaea ferganensis (Schischk.) B.Nord. & Greuter
- Jacobaea gallerandiana (Coss. & Durieu) Pelser
- Jacobaea gibbosa (Guss.) B.Nord. & Greuter
- Jacobaea gigantea (Desf.) Pelser
- Jacobaea gnaphalioides (Sieber ex Spreng.) Veldkamp
- Jacobaea incana (L.) Veldkamp
- Jacobaea inops (Boiss. & Balansa) B.Nord.
- Jacobaea leucophylla (DC.) Pelser
- Jacobaea lycopifolia (Poir.) Greuter & B.Nord.
- Jacobaea maritima (L.) Pelser & Meijden
- Jacobaea maroccana (P.H.Davis) Pelser
- Jacobaea minuta (Cav.) Pelser & Veldkamp
- Jacobaea mollis (Willd.) B.Nord.
- Jacobaea mouterdei (Arènes) Greuter & B.Nord.
- Jacobaea ornata (Druce) Greuter & B.Nord.
- Jacobaea othonnae (M.Bieb.) C.A.Mey.
- Jacobaea paludosa (L.) G.Gaertn., B.Mey. & Scherb.
- Jacobaea persoonii (De Not.) Pelser
- Jacobaea samnitum (Nyman) B.Nord. & Greuter
- Jacobaea sandrasica (P.H.Davis) B.Nord. & Greuter
- Jacobaea schischkiniana (Sofieva) B.Nord. & Greuter
- Jacobaea subalpina (W.D.J.Koch) Pelser & Veldkamp
- Jacobaea trapezuntina (Boiss.) B.Nord.
- Jacobaea uniflora (All.) Veldkamp
- Jacobaea vulgaris Gaertn.

The following additional species are accepted by Plants of The World Online:

- Jacobaea acutipinna (Hand.-Mazz.) Sennikov
- Jacobaea ambracea (Turcz. ex DC.) B.Nord.
- Jacobaea analoga (DC.) Veldkamp
- Jacobaea chassanica (Barkalov) A.E.Kozhevn.
- Jacobaea carniolica (Willd.) Schrank
- Jacobaea disjuncta (Flatscher, Schneew. & Schönsw.) Galasso & Bartolucci
- Jacobaea echaeta (Y.L.Chen & K.Y.Pan) B.Nord.
- Jacobaea graciliflora (DC.) Sennikov
- Jacobaea grandidentata (Ledeb.) Vasjukov
- Jacobaea insubrica (Chenevard) Galasso & Bartolucci
- Jacobaea korshinskyi (Krasch.) B.Nord.
- Jacobaea kuanshanensis (C.I Peng & S.W.Chung) S.S.Ying
- Jacobaea litvinovii (Schischk.) Zuev
- Jacobaea morrisonensis (Hayata) S.S.Ying
- Jacobaea multibracteolata (C.Jeffrey & Y.L.Chen) B.Nord.
- Jacobaea norica (Flatscher, Schneew. & Schönsw.) Galasso & Bartolucci
- Jacobaea nudicaulis (Buch.-Ham. ex D.Don) B.Nord.
- Jacobaea pancicii (Degen) Vladimir. & Raab-Straube
- Jacobaea pseudoarnica (Less.) Zuev
- Jacobaea racemosa (M.Bieb.) Pelser
- Jacobaea raphanifolia (Wall. ex DC.) B.Nord.
- Jacobaea renardii (C.Winkl.) B.Nord.
- Jacobaea schwetzowii (Korsh.) Tatanov & Vasjukov
- Jacobaea tarokoensis (C.I Peng) S.S.Ying
- Jacobaea taurica (Konechn.) Mosyakin & Yena
- Jacobaea thuretii (Briq. & Cavill.) B.Bock
- Jacobaea tibetica (Hook.f.) B.Nord.
