= Tomostima =

Scientific classification
- Kingdom: Plantae
- Clade: Tracheophytes
- Clade: Angiosperms
- Clade: Eudicots
- Clade: Rosids
- Order: Brassicales
- Family: Brassicaceae
- Tribe: Arabideae
- Genus: Tomostima; Raf.

Genus of flowering plants

Tomostima is a genus of flowering plants belonging to the family Brassicaceae.

Its native range is Northern America, Peru to Southern South America.

== Species ==
Six species are accepted.

- Tomostima araboides (Wedd.) Al-Shehbaz, M.Koch & Jordon-Thaden
- Tomostima australis (R.Br. ex Hook.f.) Al-Shehbaz, M.Koch & Jordon-Thaden
- Tomostima cuneifolia (Nutt.) Al-Shehbaz, M.Koch & Jordon-Thaden
- Tomostima platycarpa (Torr. & A.Gray) Al-Shehbaz, M.Koch & Jordon-Thaden
- Tomostima reptans (Lam.) Al-Shehbaz, M.Koch & Jordon-Thaden
- Tomostima sonorae (Greene) Al-Shehbaz, M.Koch & Jordon-Thaden
