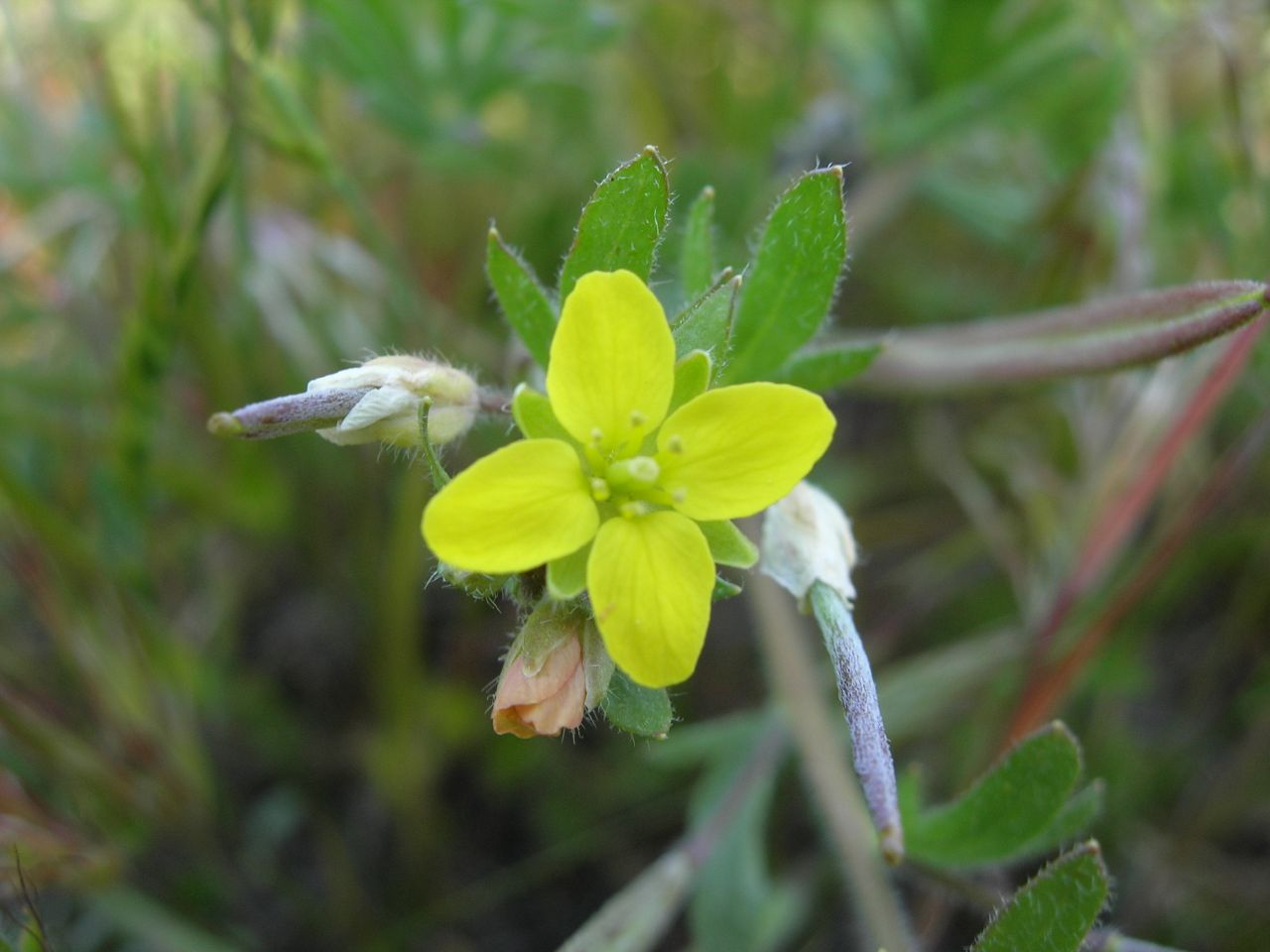

Conservation status
- Secure (NatureServe)

Scientific classification
- Kingdom: Plantae
- Clade: Tracheophytes
- Clade: Angiosperms
- Clade: Eudicots
- Clade: Rosids
- Order: Brassicales
- Family: Brassicaceae
- Genus: Tropidocarpum
- Species: T. gracile

Binomial name
- Tropidocarpum gracile Hook.

= Tropidocarpum gracile =

Species of flowering plant

Tropidocarpum gracile is a species of flowering plant in the family Brassicaceae known by the common name dobie pod. It is native to California and Baja California, where it can be found in many types of habitat from coastal canyons to inland mountains and deserts in chaparral, scrub, woodlands, beaches, valleys, and washes. It is an annual herb producing a decumbent to erect, spreading, branching stem 10 to 50 centimeters in length. It is coated in short and long rough hairs. The basal leaves are up to 10 to 15 centimeters long and are divided into elongated lobes along the edges; leaves higher on the stem are shorter and sometimes less divided. The inflorescence is an open raceme of mustardlike flowers with four petals each about 4 millimeters long. The petals are yellow and sometimes purple-tinged. The fruit is a narrow silique several centimeters in length containing tiny brown seeds.
