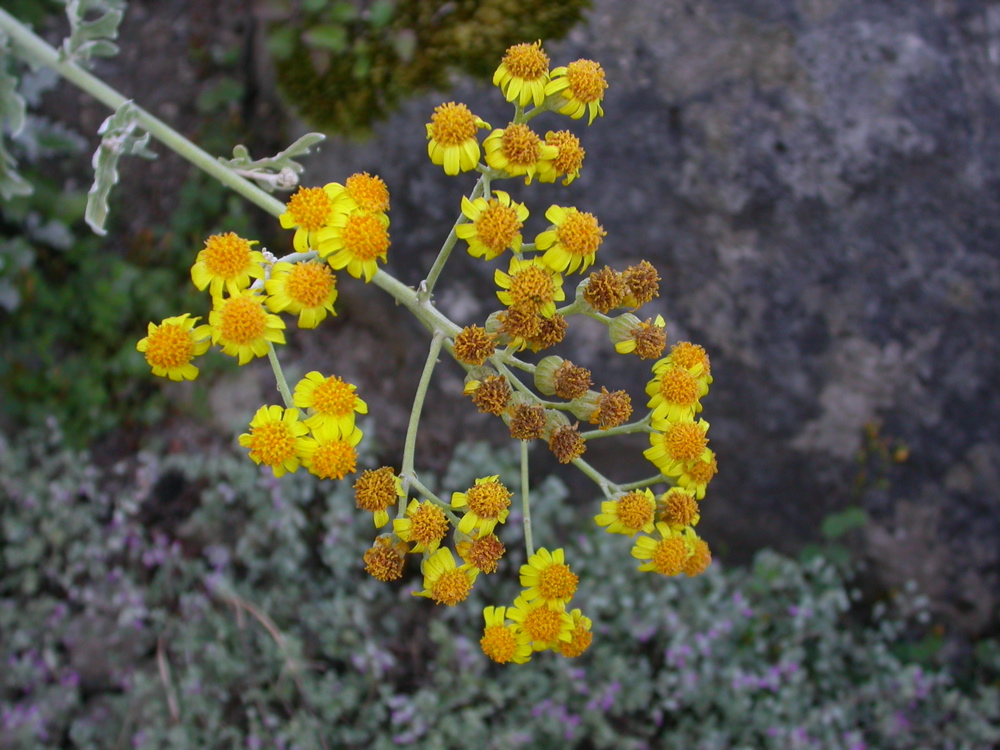

Scientific classification
- Kingdom: Plantae
- Clade: Tracheophytes
- Clade: Angiosperms
- Clade: Eudicots
- Clade: Asterids
- Order: Asterales
- Family: Asteraceae
- Genus: Jacobaea
- Species: J. gibbosa

Binomial name
- Jacobaea gibbosa (Guss.) B.Nord. & Greuter (2006)

Synonyms
- Cineraria gibbosa Guss. (1821); Cineraria littoralis Vest (1820); Jacobaea maritima subsp. gibbosa (Guss.) Peruzzi, N.G.Passal. & C.E.Jarvis (2006); Senecio ambiguus subsp. gibbosus (Guss.) Chater (1974); Senecio cineraria subsp. gibbosus (Guss.) Peruzzi & N.G.Passal. (2003); Senecio gibbosus (Guss.) DC. (1838)

= Jacobaea gibbosa =

Species of flowering plant

Jacobaea gibbosa is a species (synonym Senecio gibbosus) of the genus Jacobaea and the family Asteraceae. It is a subshrub native to southern Italy and Sicily.
