= Jacobaea trapezuntina =

Conservation status
- Critically Imperiled (NatureServe)

Scientific classification
- Kingdom: Plantae
- Clade: Tracheophytes
- Clade: Angiosperms
- Clade: Eudicots
- Clade: Asterids
- Order: Asterales
- Family: Asteraceae
- Genus: Jacobaea
- Species: J. trapezuntina

Binomial name
- Jacobaea trapezuntina (Boiss.) B.Nord.

Species of plant

Jacobaea trapezuntina, the Trapezuntian groundsel, is a herbaceous plant, a member of the family Asteraceae.

== Distribution ==
It is a species native to Turkey.

== Taxonomy ==
It was named by Bertil Nordenstam, in Willdenowia 37: 181, in 2007.
