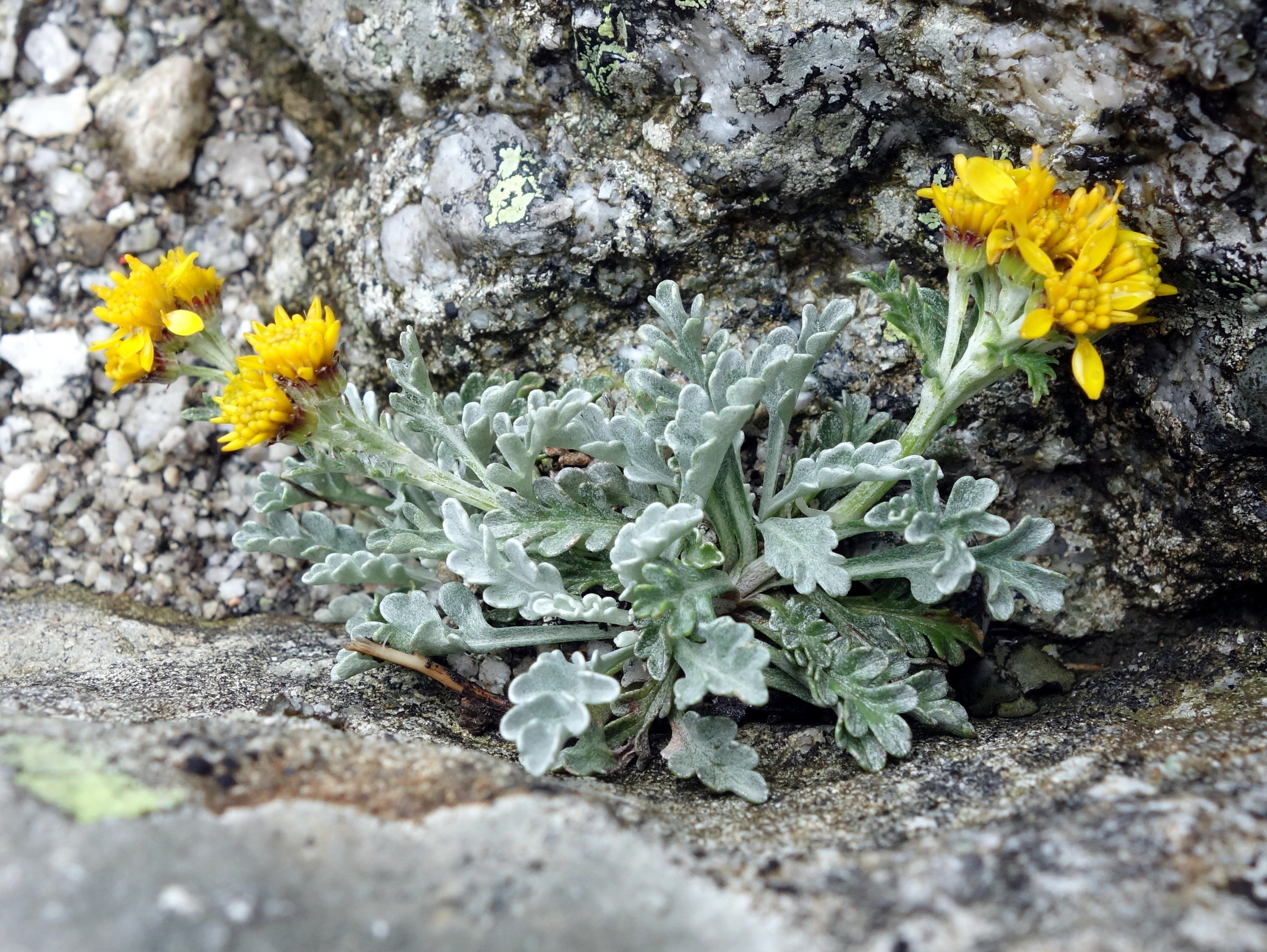

Scientific classification
- Kingdom: Plantae
- Clade: Tracheophytes
- Clade: Angiosperms
- Clade: Eudicots
- Clade: Asterids
- Order: Asterales
- Family: Asteraceae
- Genus: Jacobaea
- Species: J. insubrica

Binomial name
- Jacobaea insubrica (Chenevard) Galasso & Bartolucci

= Jacobaea insubrica =

Species of flowering plant

Jacobaea insubrica is a species of plant in the genus Jacobaea and the family Asteraceae. It is native to Italy and Switzerland. It was described as a new combination in 2015 by Galasso and Bartolucci.
