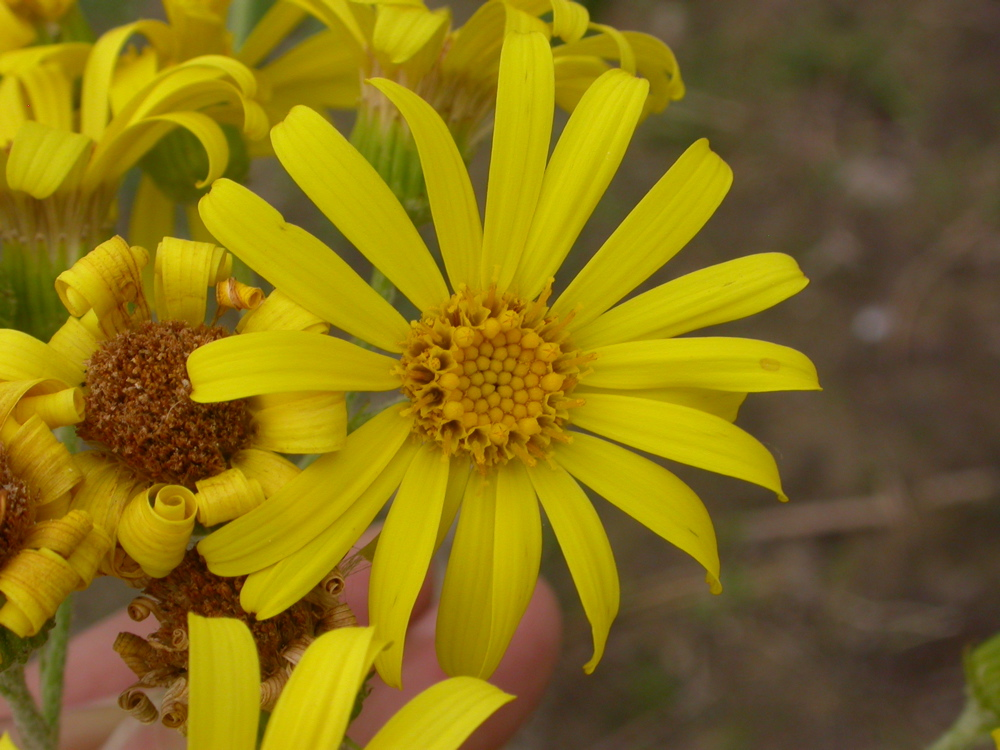

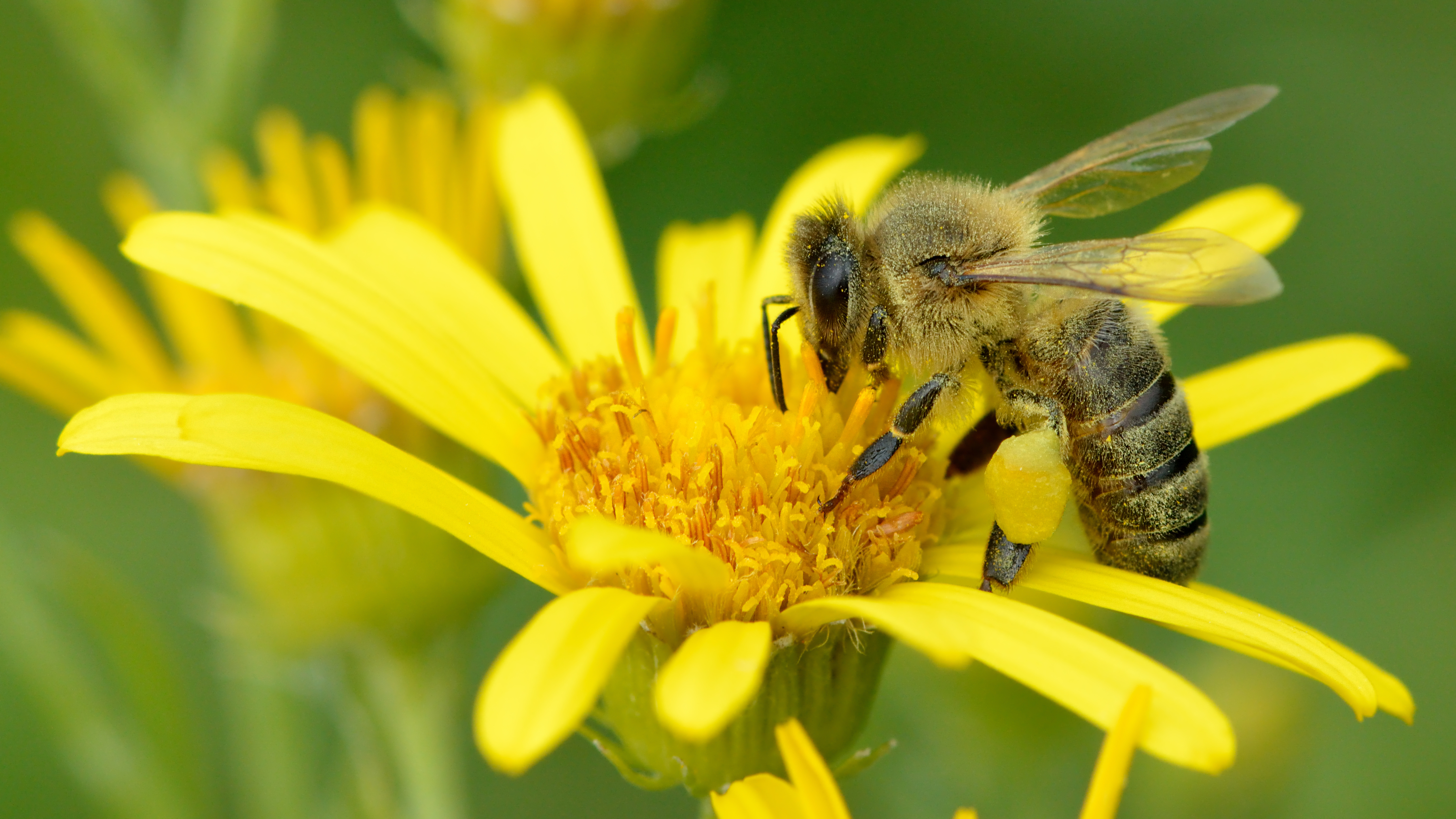

Scientific classification
- Kingdom: Plantae
- Clade: Tracheophytes
- Clade: Angiosperms
- Clade: Eudicots
- Clade: Asterids
- Order: Asterales
- Family: Asteraceae
- Genus: Jacobaea
- Species: J. paludosa

Binomial name
- Jacobaea paludosa (L.) P.Gaertn., B.Mey. & Scherb.

Synonyms
- Senecio paludosus L.; Cineraria serratifolia Gray; Doria paludosa Fourr.; Senecio bohemicus Tausch.; Senecio paludosus subsp. bohemicus (Tausch) Čelak.; Senecio paludosus subsp. tomentosus Čelak.; Senecio riparius Wallr.

= Jacobaea paludosa =

Species of flowering plant

Jacobaea paludosa, syn. Senecio paludosus, the fen ragwort, is a species of the genus Jacobaea and the family Asteraceae that can be found in northern Italy, and everywhere in Europe (except for Finland, Iceland, Ireland, Norway, Portugal and Russia).
