= Draba ecuadoriana =

Conservation status
- Critically Endangered (IUCN 3.1)

Scientific classification
- Kingdom: Plantae
- Clade: Tracheophytes
- Clade: Angiosperms
- Clade: Eudicots
- Clade: Rosids
- Order: Brassicales
- Family: Brassicaceae
- Genus: Draba
- Species: D. ecuadoriana

Binomial name
- Draba ecuadoriana Al-Shehbaz

Species of flowering plant

Draba ecuadoriana is a species of flowering plant in the family Brassicaceae. It is found only in Ecuador. Its natural habitat is rocky areas. It is threatened by habitat loss. Creeping herb, pubescent, rosette leaves. White flowers with lilac tints. Green fruits with purple.
