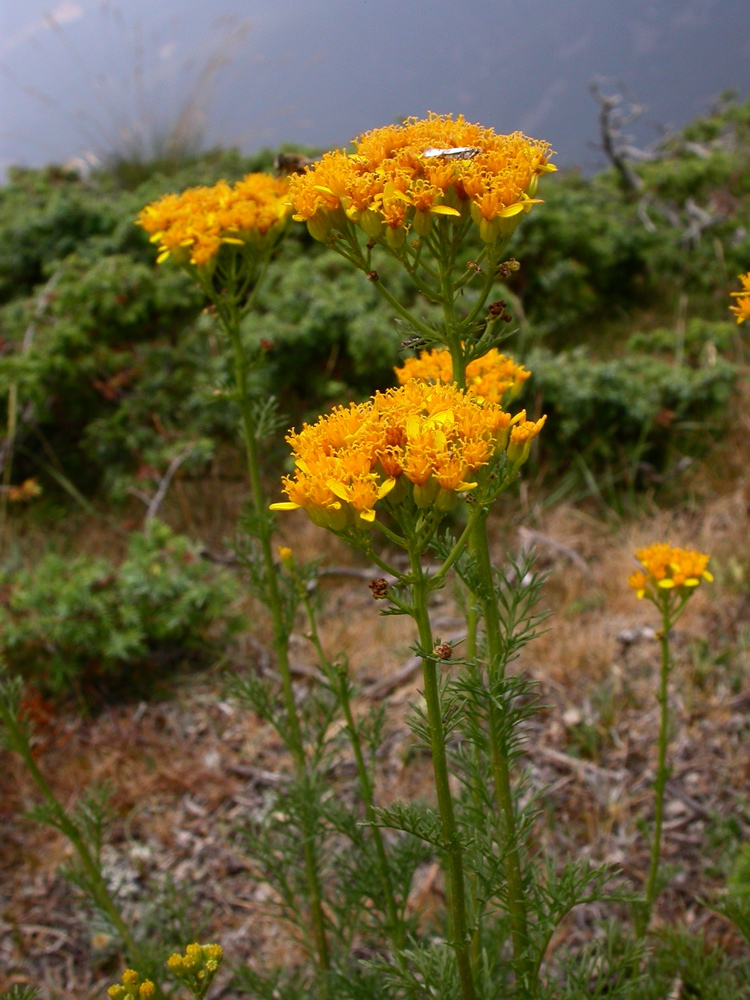

Scientific classification
- Kingdom: Plantae
- Clade: Tracheophytes
- Clade: Angiosperms
- Clade: Eudicots
- Clade: Asterids
- Order: Asterales
- Family: Asteraceae
- Genus: Jacobaea
- Species: J. adonidifolia

Binomial name
- Jacobaea adonidifolia (Loisel.) Pelser & Veldkamp

Synonyms
- Senecio adonidifolius Loisel.

= Jacobaea adonidifolia =

Species of flowering plant

Jacobaea adonidifolia is a species (synonym Senecio adonidifolius) of the genus Jacobaea and the family Asteraceae.
