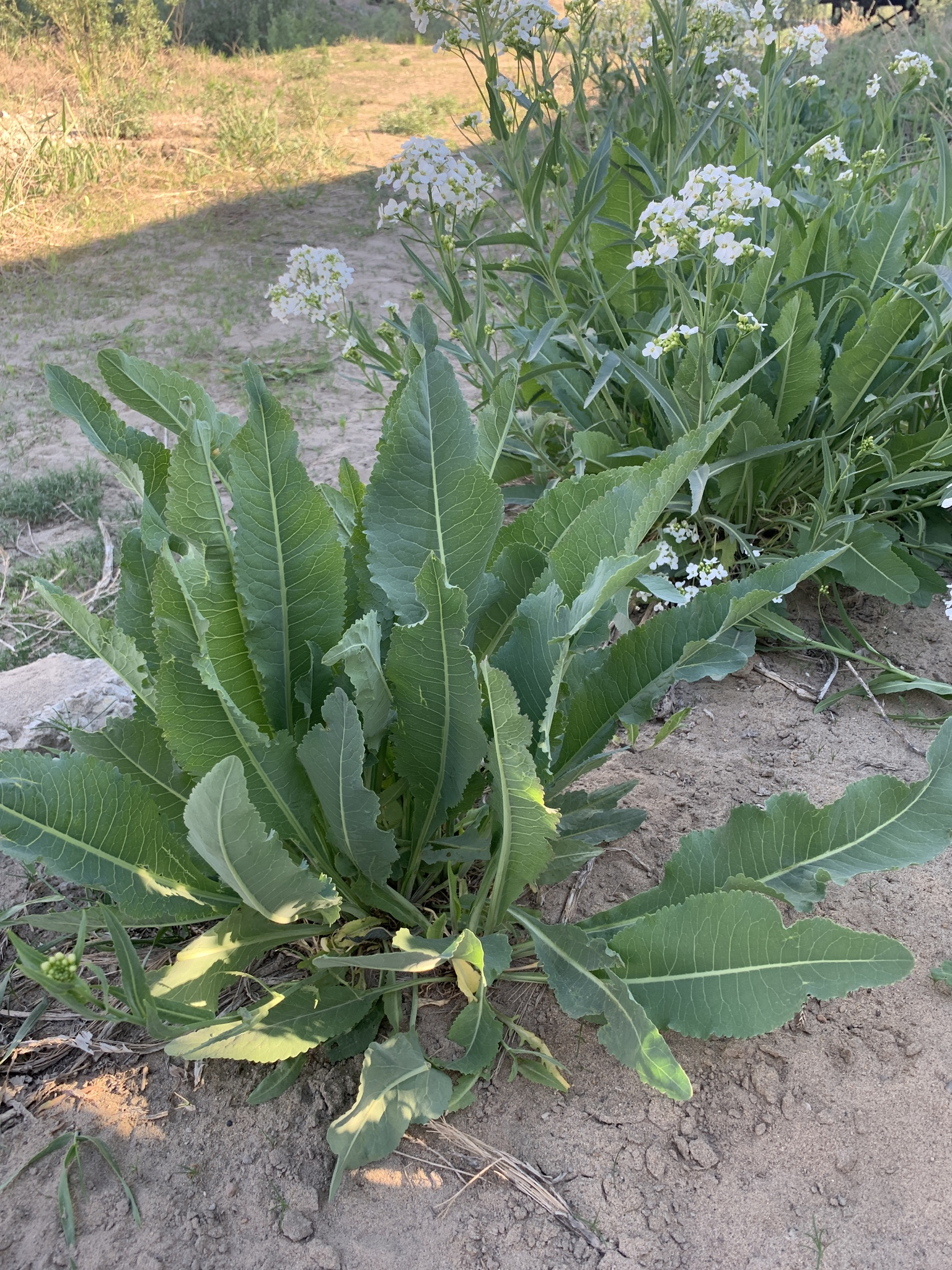

Scientific classification
- Kingdom: Plantae
- Clade: Embryophytes
- Clade: Tracheophytes
- Clade: Angiosperms
- Clade: Eudicots
- Clade: Rosids
- Order: Brassicales
- Family: Brassicaceae
- Genus: Armoracia
- Species: A. sisymbrioides

Binomial name
- Armoracia sisymbrioides (DC.) Cajander

= Armoracia sisymbrioides =

Species of flowering plant

Armoracia sisymbrioides is a species of flowering plant in the mustard family, Brassicaceae. It is native to Asia.

It was first formally named Cochlearia sisymbroides in 1821 and was transferred to the genus Armoracia in 1902.
