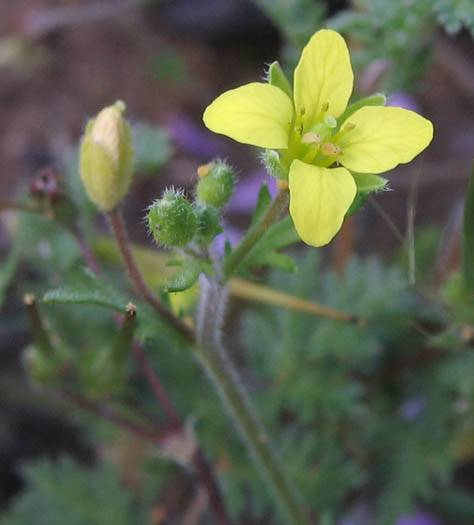
- Tropidocarpum gracile

Scientific classification
- Kingdom: Plantae
- Clade: Tracheophytes
- Clade: Angiosperms
- Clade: Eudicots
- Clade: Rosids
- Order: Brassicales
- Family: Brassicaceae
- Genus: Tropidocarpum; Hook.

Species
- 4, See text.

Synonyms
- Agallis Phil.; Twisselmannia Al-Shehbaz

= Tropidocarpum =

Genus of flowering plants

Tropidocarpum is a genus of flowering plants in the family Brassicaceae. There are two to four species, one of which is extremely rare. Tropidocarpum capparideum, the caper-fruited tropidocarpum, is a plant endemic to California generally considered to be extinct since the 1950s, but has been reported since. Specimens were collected at Fort Hunter Liggett, California, in 2000 and 2001. Its status is currently in debate. The other member of the genus, the dobie pod, T. gracile, is a common mustardlike plant in California and Baja California. Two other plants in separate monotypic genera, Twisselmannia and Agallis, were moved to Tropidocarpum.

== Species ==
Four species are accepted.

- Tropidocarpum californicum (Al-Shehbaz) Al-Shehbaz
- Tropidocarpum capparideum Greene
- Tropidocarpum gracile Hook.
- Tropidocarpum lanatum (Barnéoud) Al-Shehbaz & R.A.Price
