= Ihsan Ali Al-Shehbaz =

American botanist

Ihsan Ali Al-Shehbaz (born 1939 in Iraq) is an American botanist who works as adjunct professor at University of Missouri-St. Louis and Senior Curator at Missouri Botanical Garden. Al-Shehbaz's primary area of interest is Brassicaceae and The Durango Herald called him "a world expert on taxonomy of the family". A 2008 publication of the United States Fish and Wildlife Service called him "the world's authority on species in the genus Lesquerella". The author abbreviation "Al-Shehbaz" is attached to the numerous botanical taxa he has identified.

== Education ==
In 1962, Al-Shehbaz earned a Bachelor of Science degree from Baghdad University. He pursued graduate studies in the United States, gaining a Master of Science degree from Harvard University in 1969 and a Ph.D. from Harvard in 1973.

== Career ==
Prior to his current professorial and curatorial position, Al-Shehbaz was a professor and director of an herbarium at Baghdad University, a professor and director of a herbarium at Sulaymaniyah University in Iraq, and a postdoctoral fellow at Harvard University's Arnold Arboretum. In 1992, Al-Shehbaz edited all botanical entries for the third edition of the American Heritage Dictionary. He has worked on major projects about the Flora of North America and, with the help of the Chinese botanists, the Flora of China. In regard to the latter, Al-Shehbaz said:

By unlocking the knowledge of China's great botanical treasures for the rest of the world, the project brings together hundreds of Chinese and Western scientists for an invaluable exchange of ideas, training, information, and plant specimens. It is an enormous advancement for systematic and applied botany ... China's plant species represent a significant percentage of the world's total. If we don't do this kind of research, how will we know what we have and how to protect it?

== Academic specialties ==
Al-Shehbaz's primary academic interests are the phylogeny and systematics of the family Brassicaceae, especially in the Himalayas, Central Asia, and the Americas with emphasis on the South American and Chinese members. He also has an interest in conservation and the preservation of biological diversity. According to Al-Shehbaz, if "we want to have a peaceful world, to live in harmony, we have to know how to cooperate, both with humans and with other species."

Al-Shehbaz has described ten new genera previously unknown to science. He has described over four hundred plant species and more than seventy of them were previously unknown. Al-Shehbaz has called botanical science "a race with time to document what's there before it's gone."

Alyssum, Arabidopsis, Arabis, Armoracia, Barbarea, Boechera, Draba (of which he revised many South American members), Erucastrum, Nasturtium, Raphanus, Rorippa, Schizopetalon, Sisymbrium, and Tropidocarpum are among the genera in which he has identified plant species. Some specific plant species Al-Shehbaz has identified include Cardamine lojanensis, Draba ecuadoriana, and Draba steyermarkii.

== Selected bibliography ==
- Al-Shehbaz, I. A. 2006. The genus Sisymbrium in South America, with synopses of the genera Chilocardamum, Mostacillastrum, Neuontobotrys, and Polypsecadium (Brassicaceae). Darwiniana 44: 341–358.
- Warwick, S. I., A. Francis & I. A. Al-Shehbaz. 2006. Brassicaceae: species checklist and database on CD-Rom. Pl. Syst. Evol. 259: 249–258.
- Warwick, S. I. & I. A. Al-Shehbaz. 2006. Brassicaceae: chromosome number index and database on CD-Rom. Pl. Syst. Evol. 259: 237–248.
- Al-Shehbaz, I. A., M. A. Beilstein & E. A. Kellogg. 2006. Systematics and phylogeny of the Brassicaceae: an overview. Pl. Syst. Evol. 259: 89–120.
- Beilstein, M., I. A. Al-Shehbaz & E. A. Kellogg. 2006. Brassicaceae phylogeny and trichome evolution. Am. J. Bot. 93: 607–619.
- Mitchell-Olds, T., I. A. Al-Shehbaz, M. Koch & T. F. Sharbel. 2005. Crucifer evolution in the post-genomic era. Pp. 119–137 in R. J. Henry, ed., Plant Diversity and Evolution: Genotypic and Phenotypic Variation in Higher Plants. CAB International.
- O'Kane, S. L., Jr. & I. A. Al-Shehbaz. 2003. Phylogenetic position and generic limits of Arabidopsis (Brassicaceae) based on sequences of nuclear ribosomal DNA. Ann. Missouri Bot. Gard. 90: 603–612.
- Al-Shehbaz, I. A. 2003. Transfer of most North American species of Arabis to Boechera (Brassicaceae). Novon 13: 381–391.
- Koch, M., I. A. Al-Shehbaz & K. Mummenhoff. 2003. Molecular systematics, evolution, and population biology in the mustard family (Brassicaceae). Ann. Missouri Bot. Gard. 90: 151–171.
- Appel, O. & I. A. Al-Shehbaz. 2003. Cruciferae. In: K. Kubitzki (editor), Families and Genera of Vascular Plants. 5: 75–174. Springer-Verlag, Berlin, Heidelberg.
