= Bernhard Meyer =

German physician and naturalist (1767–1836)

Bernhard Meyer (24 August 1767 – 1 January 1836) was a German medical doctor and naturalist.

Meyer was the joint author, with Philipp Gottfried Gaertner (1754–1825) and Johannes Scherbius (1769–1813) of Oekonomisch-technische Flora der Wetterau (1799), which was the source of the scientific name of many plants. He was also the joint author, with Johann Wolf, of Naturgeschichte der Vögel Deutschlands (1806and Taschenbuch der deutschen Vögelkunde (1810–22).
