= Johannes Scherbius =

German physician and botanist

Johannes Scherbius (1 June 1769, Frankfurt am Main – 8 November 1813) was a German physician and botanist.

In 1790 he obtained his doctorate of medicine at Jena, later working as a physician in his hometown of Frankfurt. In Frankfurt, he was associated with the Senckenberg Institute.

With Philipp Gottfried Gaertner and Bernhard Meyer, he was co-author of "Oekonomisch-technische Flora der Wetterau" (Economic-technical flora of Wetterau), a three-volume work that was a source of scientific names for numerous plants.

== Published works ==
- "Dissertatio inauguralis medica de Lysimachiae purpureae sive Lythri salicariae Linn. virtute medicinali non dubia", Jenae, Ex Officina Fiedleriana (1790).
- "Commentationis de sanguinis missione in febribus intermittentibus", (1790).
- Oekonomisch-technische Flora der Wetterau, (1799-1802, 3 vols. [vol. 1 (VI-VII.1799); vol. 2 (V-VII.1800); vol. 3 (1) (I-VI.1801); vol. 3 (2) (1802); (with Philipp Gottfried Gaertner and Bernhard Meyer).
- Pharmakopoe und Arznei-Taxe für das bei der hiesigen Armen-Anstalt angestellte medicinische Personale, (1809).
