= Philipp Gottfried Gaertner =

German botanist

Philipp Gottfried Gaertner (29 October 1754, Hanau – 27 December 1825, Hanau) was a German botanist.

An apothecary from Hanau, Gaertner spent several years in Strasbourg as a student of botany. With Bernhard Meyer and Johannes Scherbius, he was co-author of "Oekonomisch-technische Flora der Wetterau", a publication in which the three men described various botanical genera and species.

It is possible that during his lifetime he was known as Gottfried Gaertner, and that "Philipp" was added after his death. That may have been because it was the custom of the time to add the name of his father after death, or because "Dr. Phil. Gottfired Gaertner" on his death notice was interpreted as Dr. Philipp instead of "Doctor of Philosophy".

== Bibliography ==
- Oekonomisch-technische Flora der Wetterau, (1799–1802, 3 vols. [vol. 1 (VI-VII.1799); vol. 2 (V-VII.1800); vol. 3 (1) (I-VI.1801); vol. 3 (2) (1802) – Economic-technical flora of Wetterau.
