= Clastopus =

Clastopus may refer to:

- Clastopus (beetle), a genus of beetles in the family Tenebrionidae
- Clastopus (plant), a genus of flowering plants in the family Brassicaceae
