= Clastopus (plant) =

Scientific classification
- Kingdom: Plantae
- Clade: Tracheophytes
- Clade: Angiosperms
- Clade: Eudicots
- Clade: Rosids
- Order: Brassicales
- Family: Brassicaceae
- Genus: Clastopus; Bunge ex Boiss.

Genus of flowering plants

Clastopus is a genus of flowering plants belonging to the family Brassicaceae.

Its native range is Iraq to Iran.

Species:

- Clastopus erubescens Hausskn.
- Clastopus purpureus Bunge ex Boiss.
- Clastopus vestitus (Desv.) Boiss.
