= Synthlipsis =

Synthlipsis may refer to:

- Synthlipsis (bug), a genus of true bugs in the family Miridae
- Synthlipsis (plant), a genus of flowering plants in the family Brassicaceae
