= Synthlipsis (plant) =

Scientific classification
- Kingdom: Plantae
- Clade: Tracheophytes
- Clade: Angiosperms
- Clade: Eudicots
- Clade: Rosids
- Order: Brassicales
- Family: Brassicaceae
- Genus: Synthlipsis; A.Gray

Genus of flowering plants

Synthlipsis is a genus of flowering plants belonging to the family Brassicaceae.

Its native range is Texas to Northeastern Mexico.

Species:

- Synthlipsis densiflora Rollins
- Synthlipsis greggii A.Gray
