= Cardamine parviflora var. arenicola =

Conservation status
- Secure (NatureServe)

Scientific classification
- Kingdom: Plantae
- Clade: Tracheophytes
- Clade: Angiosperms
- Clade: Eudicots
- Clade: Rosids
- Order: Brassicales
- Family: Brassicaceae
- Genus: Cardamine
- Species: C. parviflora
- Variety: C. p. var. arenicola

Trinomial name
- Cardamine parviflora var. arenicola (Britton) O.E. Schulz

Variety of flowering plant

Cardamine parviflora var. arenicola, commonly known as sand bittercress, is a flowering plant that is usually regarded as a variety in the family Brassicaceae native to North America. Cardamine parviflora var. arenicola was initially described as a distinct species, but is now commonly treated as a variety. However, recent nuclear DNA data suggests a sister relationship between the American and Eurasian plants (though cpDNA data found the two taxa to be intermingled).

== Etymology ==
The specific epithet parviflora is Latin for "small flower", and the varietal epithet is Latin for "growing in sandy places".

== Description ==
Cardamine parviflora var. arenicola is morphologically distinct from Cardamine parviflora var. parviflora and may warrant specific recognition. Cardamine parviflora var. arenicola differs from its Eurasian counterpart due to its overall larger stature, broader and toothed basal leaflets, and generally longer siliques. Cardamine parviflora var. arenicola is a winter-annual.

== Distribution and habitat ==
Cardamine parviflora var. arenicola is found throughout eastern North America and also occurs in the Pacific Northwest. It grows in a variety of seasonally wet habitats with shallow or sandy soil and greenstone, diabase and granite glades. It also occurs in fallow fields and poorly draining old fields.

== Ecology ==
The flowers are likely visited by small bees and flies. The lepidopterans Anthocharis midea and Evergestis pallidata occasionally select Cardamine parviflora var. arenicola as a host plant.
