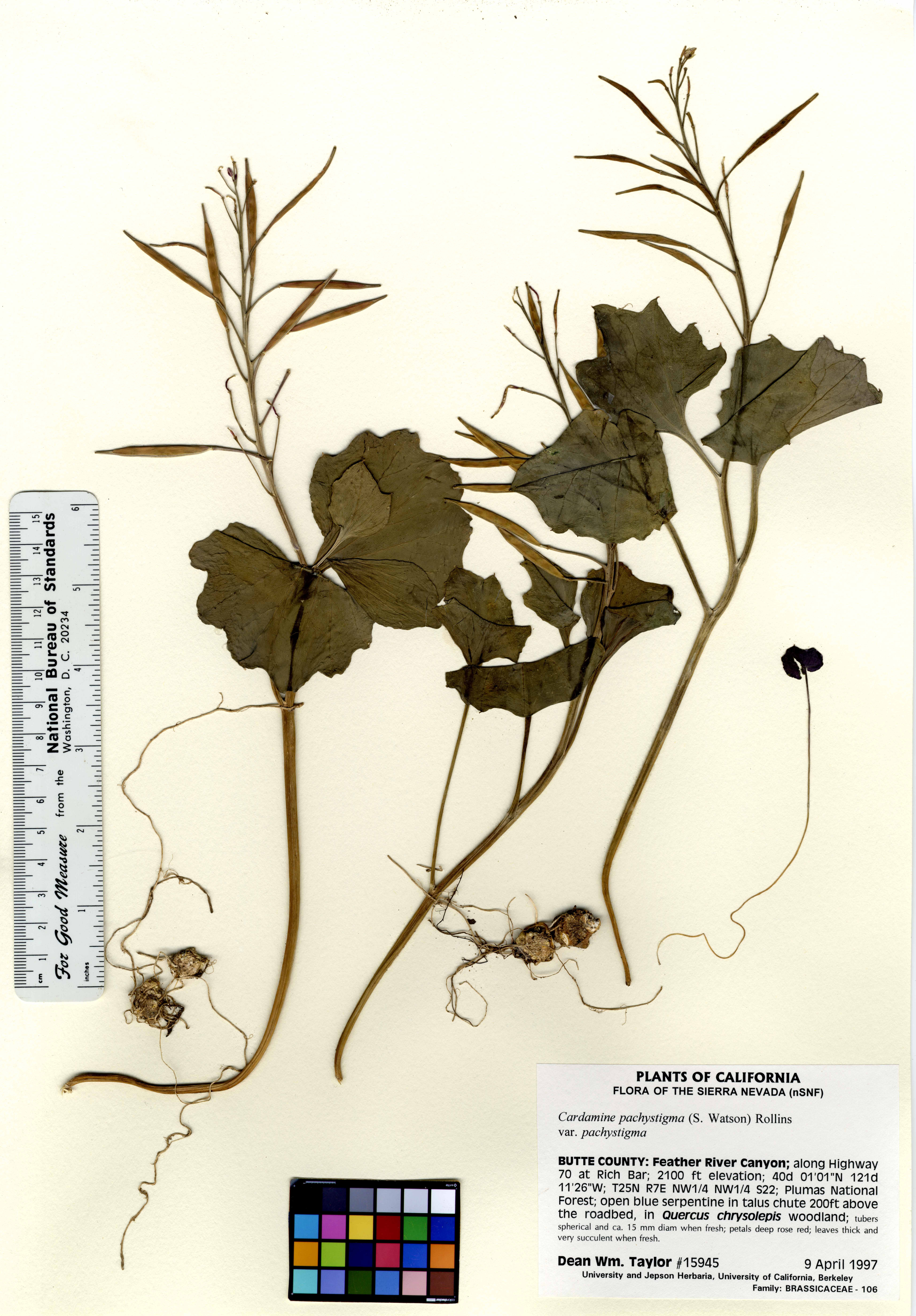

Scientific classification
- Kingdom: Plantae
- Clade: Tracheophytes
- Clade: Angiosperms
- Clade: Eudicots
- Clade: Rosids
- Order: Brassicales
- Family: Brassicaceae
- Genus: Cardamine
- Species: C. pachystigma

Binomial name
- Cardamine pachystigma (S.Wats.) Rollins

= Cardamine pachystigma =

Species of flowering plant

Cardamine pachystigma is a species of Cardamine known by the common name serpentine bittercress. It is endemic to California, where it grows in rocky mountainous areas, often on serpentine and volcanic soils.

== Description ==
Cardamine pachystigma is a hairless perennial herb producing stems from tiny rhizomes, each stem erect to about 30 centimeters in height. The leaves are generally made up of several leaflets which are oval to round, thick and fleshy, and several centimeters long. The inflorescence produces pink or purple flowers with petals up to a centimeter long. The fruit is a silique up to 6 centimeters in length.

There are two varieties of this species. The rarer, var. dissectifolia, the dissected-leaf toothwort, is an uncommon plant found scattered around the rim of the Sacramento Valley and coastal mountains to the west.
