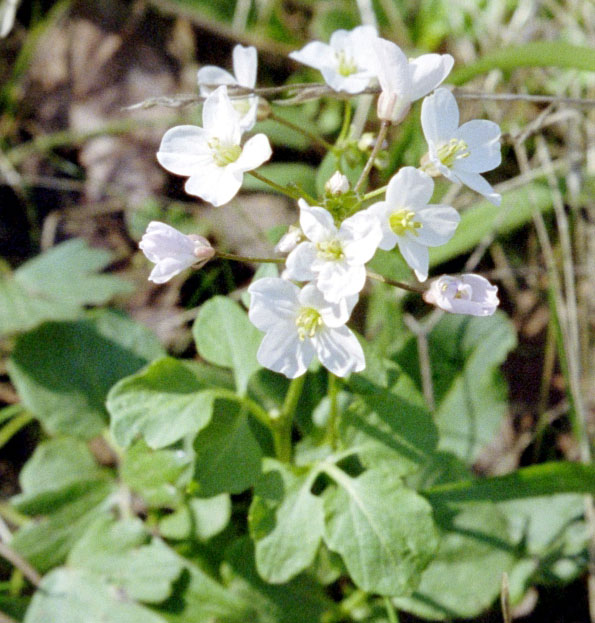

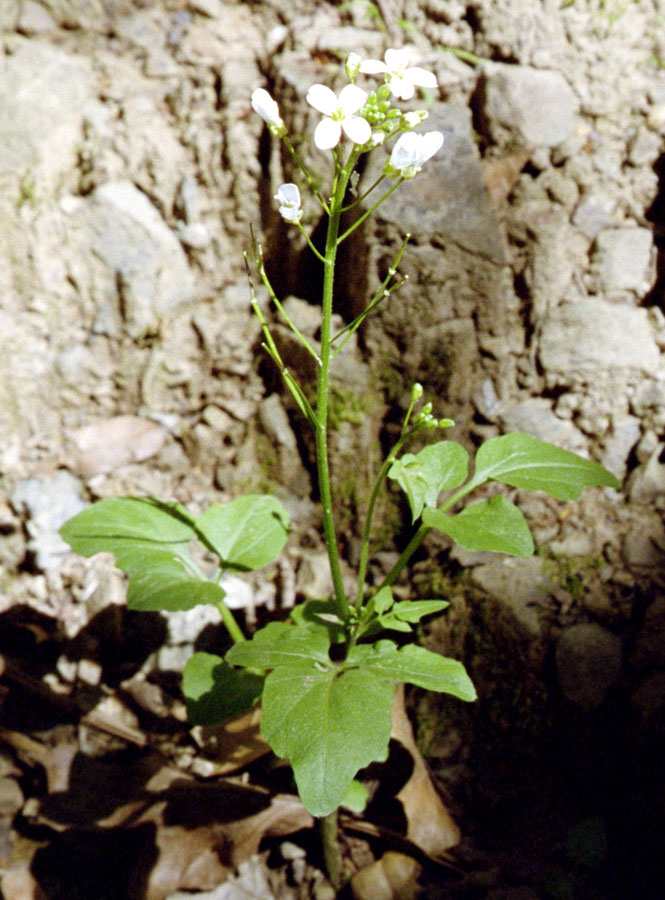

Scientific classification
- Kingdom: Plantae
- Clade: Tracheophytes
- Clade: Angiosperms
- Clade: Eudicots
- Clade: Rosids
- Order: Brassicales
- Family: Brassicaceae
- Genus: Cardamine
- Species: C. californica

Binomial name
- Cardamine californica (Nutt.) Greene

Synonyms
- Dentaria californica Nutt.

= Cardamine californica =

Species of flowering plant in the cabbage family

Cardamine californica, or milkmaids, is a flowering plant in the family Brassicaceae, native to western North America from Washington to California and Baja California. It is common in a variety of habitats including shady slopes, open woodlands, chaparral and grasslands in the winter and early spring. In the San Francisco Bay Area, it is one of the first wildflowers to bloom, with blossoms from January to May.

== Description ==
Cardamine californica is an herbaceous perennial plant growing to about 1 foot (0.3 m) tall. The flowers are borne on a raceme inflorescence, each flower about 1/2 inch in diameter with four white to pink petals. The flower closes its petals in late afternoon as the sun goes down and nods its pedicel before a rain, protecting the pollen.

Hand pollination of two milkmaids populations in the San Francisco Presidio improved seed set from 8% to 85%, with seeds ripening in about 53 days.

== Sources ==
- "Wildflowers of Henry W. Coe State Park" brochure, Larry Ulrich, 2002
