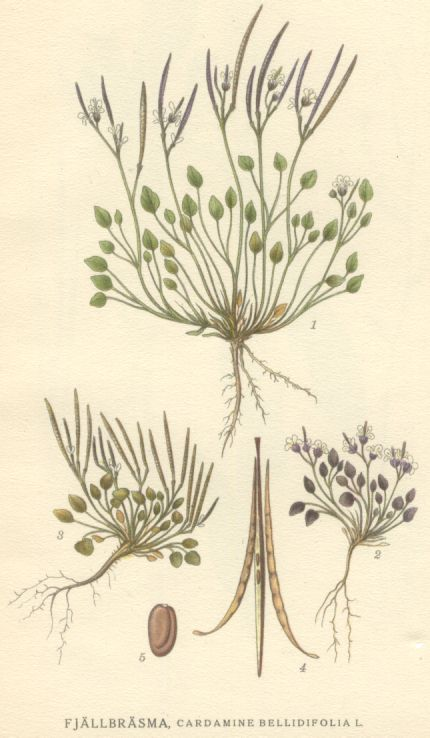

Conservation status
- Secure (NatureServe)

Scientific classification
- Kingdom: Plantae
- Clade: Tracheophytes
- Clade: Angiosperms
- Clade: Eudicots
- Clade: Rosids
- Order: Brassicales
- Family: Brassicaceae
- Genus: Cardamine
- Species: C. bellidifolia

Binomial name
- Cardamine bellidifolia L.

= Cardamine bellidifolia =

Species of flowering plant

Cardamine bellidifolia is a species of perennial rhizomatous forb known by the common name alpine bittercress. This species is a circumboreal alpine plant endemic to North America, Europe, and Asia.

== Description ==
Alpine bittercress grows from a taproot. The plant has erect or ascending glabrous, somewhat cespitose, stems roughly 2 to 10 cm (0.8 to 3.9 in) in length. Rhizomes are absent. There are numerous small ovate to oblong leaves, 5 to 30 mm (0.2 to 1.2 in) long, that grow around the base in a rosette, with small teeth along the margins. The petioles are 2 to 4 times longer than the leaf. There can be 1 to 3 cauline leaves, but they are frequently absent. The flower's petals are 4 to 5.5 mm (0.18 to 0.23 in) in length and 1.3 to 2 mm (0.05 to 0.08 in) in width, white, oblanceolate, with rounded or notched tips. The seed is oblong, 8 to 18 mm (0.3 to 0.71 in) in length and 1.5 to 2 mm (0.06 to 0.08 in) in width. Alpine bittercress can grow up to 6 inches tall.

This species flowers from June to September.

== Range and habitat ==
The alpine bittercress can be found throughout North America, Europe, and Asia. In the United States, populations have been located in California, Oregon, Washington, Alaska, New Hampshire, and Maine. In Canada, populations have been found in the provinces of Quebec, Newfoundland and Labrador, Nunavut, the Northwest Territories, Yukon, Alberta, and British Columbia. In mainland Europe, alpine bittercress had been found in Spain, France, Germany, Italy, Austria, and Switzerland. Additionally, alpine bittercress is native to Greenland, Iceland, and Russia.

While alpine bittercress is listed as secure globally, the species is listed as vulnerable in Alberta and Labrador, critically imperiled on Newfoundland island, and it is presumed extirpated from Maine. Though the species is unraked in New Hampshire, it is very rare and can only be found in the alpine northern portion of the state.

In the United States, alpine bittercress is a facultative (FAC) plant (facultative wetland (FACW) in the Northcentral and Northeast region (NCNE)), and occurs in wetlands and non-wetlands. Across its range, the species prefers alpine and subalpine climates, and can be found on or around alpine brooks, cliffs, ravines, rocky slopes, fellfields, and alpine meadows. It grows in elevations of 1800 to 2850 m (5905.5 to 9350.4 ft).

== Threats ==
Alpine bittercress is currently believed to be in decline as there more known historic occurrences than current occurrences. Potential threats include trampling, reduction and removal of viable habitat, and small population sizes.
