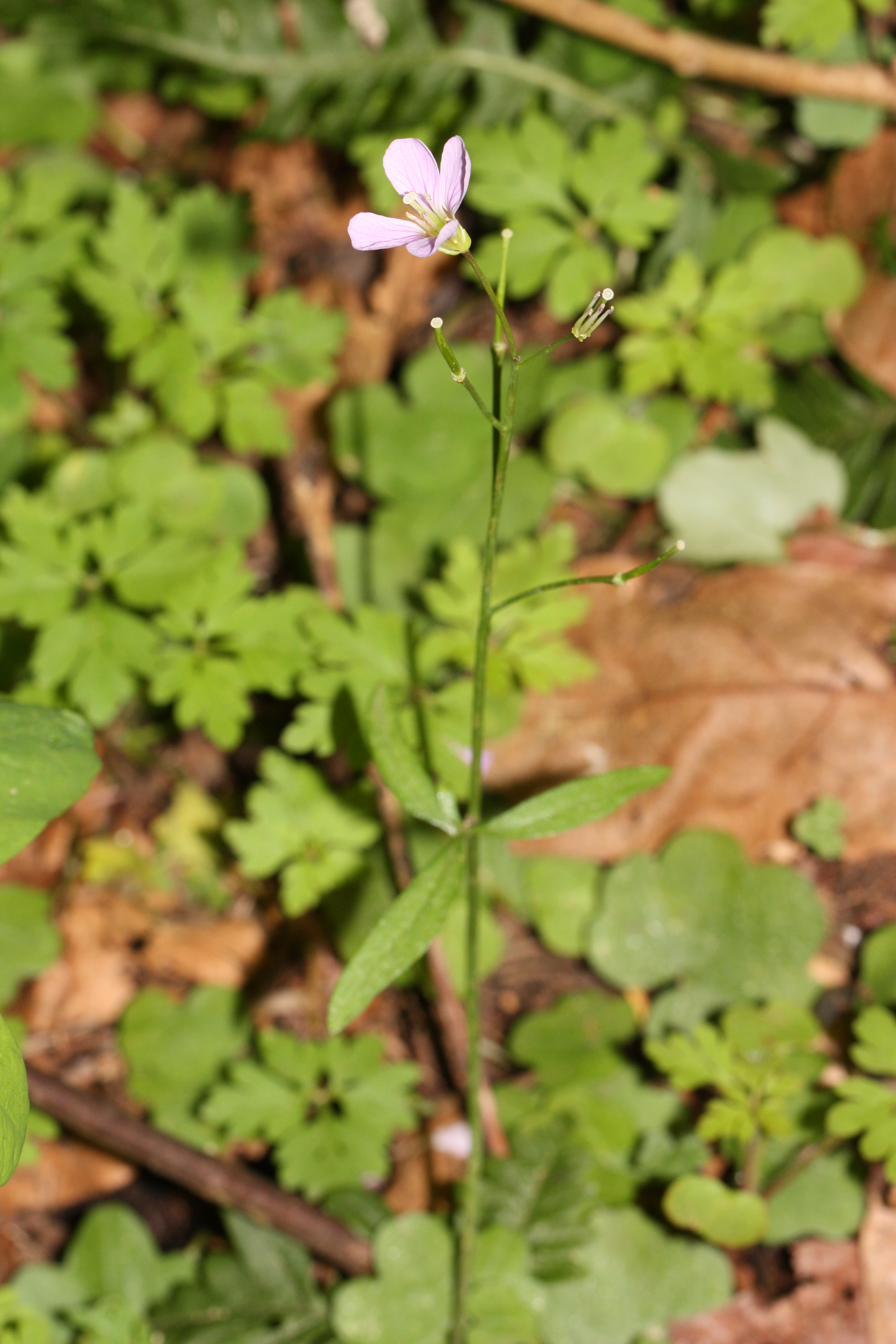

Scientific classification
- Kingdom: Plantae
- Clade: Tracheophytes
- Clade: Angiosperms
- Clade: Eudicots
- Clade: Rosids
- Order: Brassicales
- Family: Brassicaceae
- Genus: Cardamine
- Species: C. nuttallii

Binomial name
- Cardamine nuttallii Greene

= Cardamine nuttallii =

Species of flowering plant

Cardamine nuttallii is a species of cardamine known by the common name Nuttall's toothwort. It is native to western North America from British Columbia to California, where it grows in moist mountain habitats.

== Description ==
Cardamine nuttallii is a perennial herb growing from a small, white rhizome. It produces a thin, unbranching stem under 20 centimeters tall. The leaves are smooth or lobed along the edges and sometimes divided into a few smaller leaflets. The inflorescence bears generally more than one pale purple, pink, or occasionally white flowers with petals each over a centimeter long. The fruit is a silique up to 4 centimeters long.

== Varieties ==
There are four varieties of this plant. The rare Cardamine nuttallii var. gemmata is endemic to the Sequoia sempervirens redwood forests of northern California and southern Oregon.
