= Cardamine gouldii =

Scientific classification
- Kingdom: Plantae
- Clade: Tracheophytes
- Clade: Angiosperms
- Clade: Eudicots
- Clade: Rosids
- Order: Brassicales
- Family: Brassicaceae
- Genus: Cardamine
- Species: C. gouldii

Binomial name
- Cardamine gouldii Al-Shehbaz

Species of flowering plant

Cardamine gouldii is a plant species endemic to Bhutan. It is known only from a single specimen in the herbarium of Kew Botanic Garden in London, collected in 1938 in the Bumthang District.

Cardamine gouldii is a perennial herb. Middle leaves have 5 leaflets, upper leaves have 3 leaflets. Petiole is 1–3 cm long, slightly winged, not auriculate. Leaflets are oblong to lanceolate, up to 5 cm long. Flowers white, with oblong petals up to 15 mm long.
