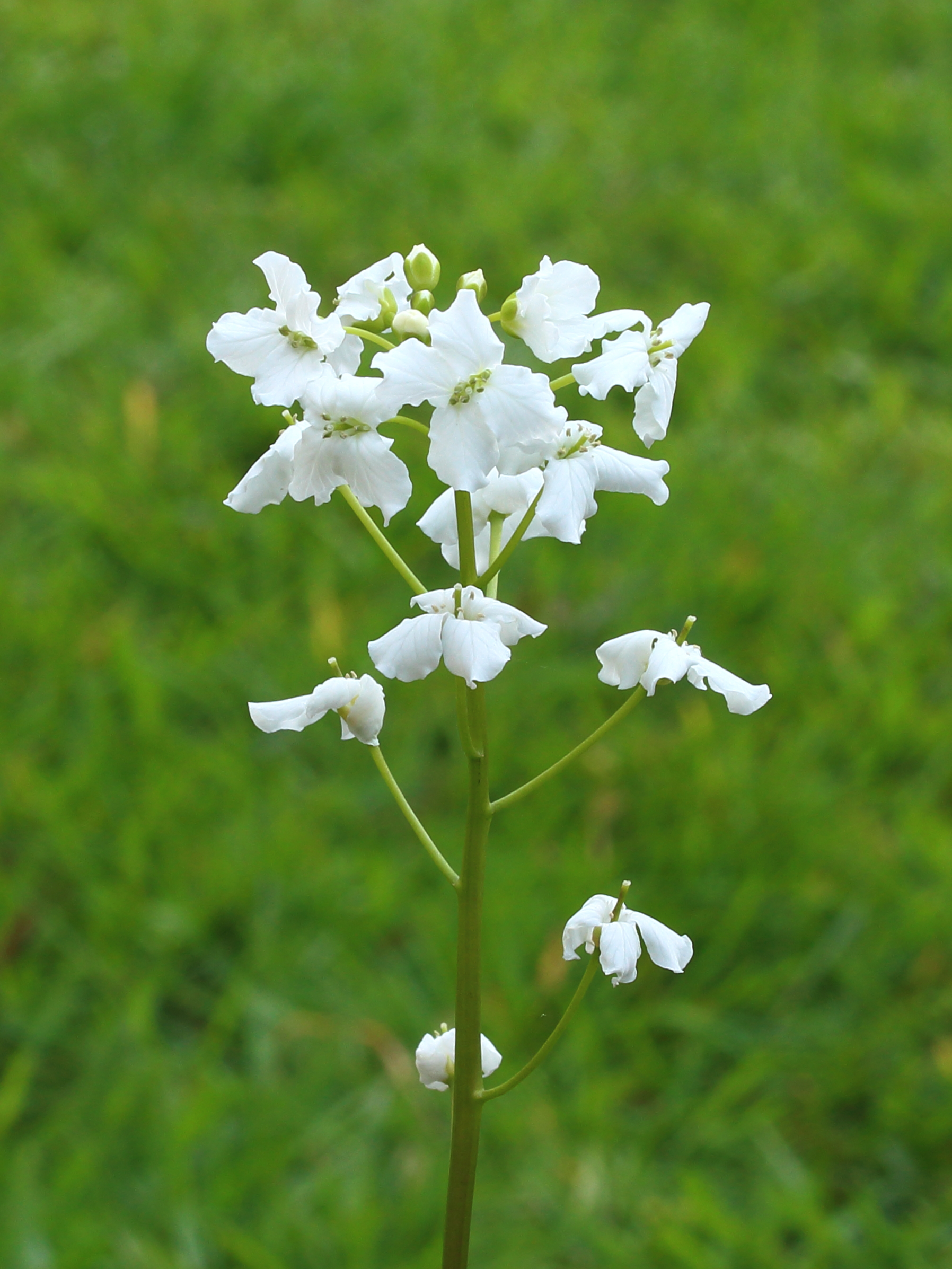
- Inflorescence
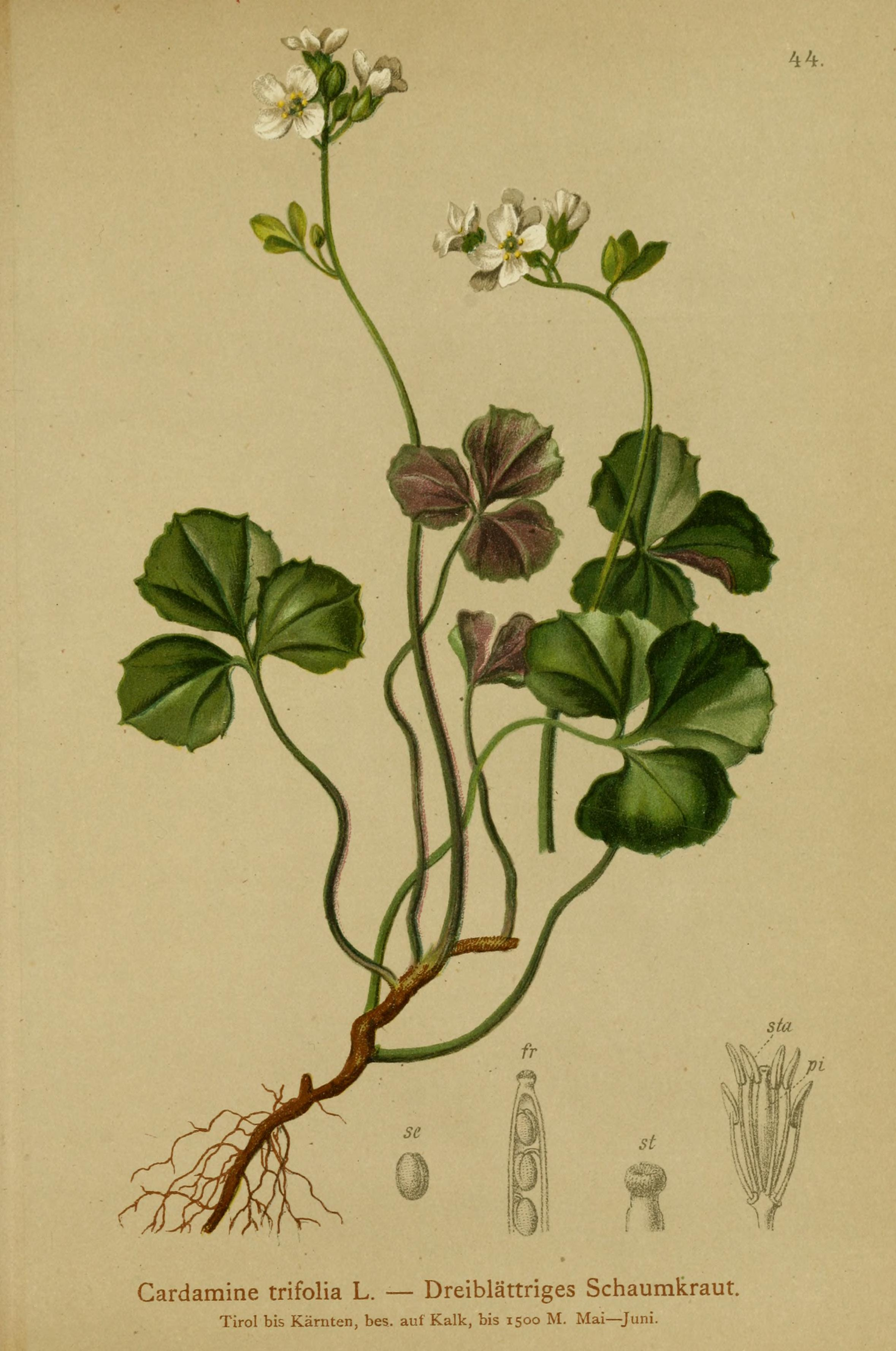
- Botanical illustration

Scientific classification
- Kingdom: Plantae
- Clade: Tracheophytes
- Clade: Angiosperms
- Clade: Eudicots
- Clade: Rosids
- Order: Brassicales
- Family: Brassicaceae
- Genus: Cardamine
- Species: C. trifolia

Binomial name
- Cardamine trifolia L.

Synonyms
- Cardamine trifolia var. bijuga O.E.Schulz; Crucifera trifolia E.H.L.Krause; Dentaria alternifolia Dalla Torre

= Cardamine trifolia =

Species of plant

Cardamine trifolia, the trefoil cress, trifoliate bittercress, or three-leaved cuckoo flower, is a species of flowering plant in the family Brassicaceae. It is native to central and southern Europe, and has been introduced to Great Britain. It appears to have survived in several glacial refugia in the Alps, the western Carpathians and Dinaric Alps from where it spread to nearby area. A creeping perennial, in the garden it is recommended as a ground cover in shady areas.

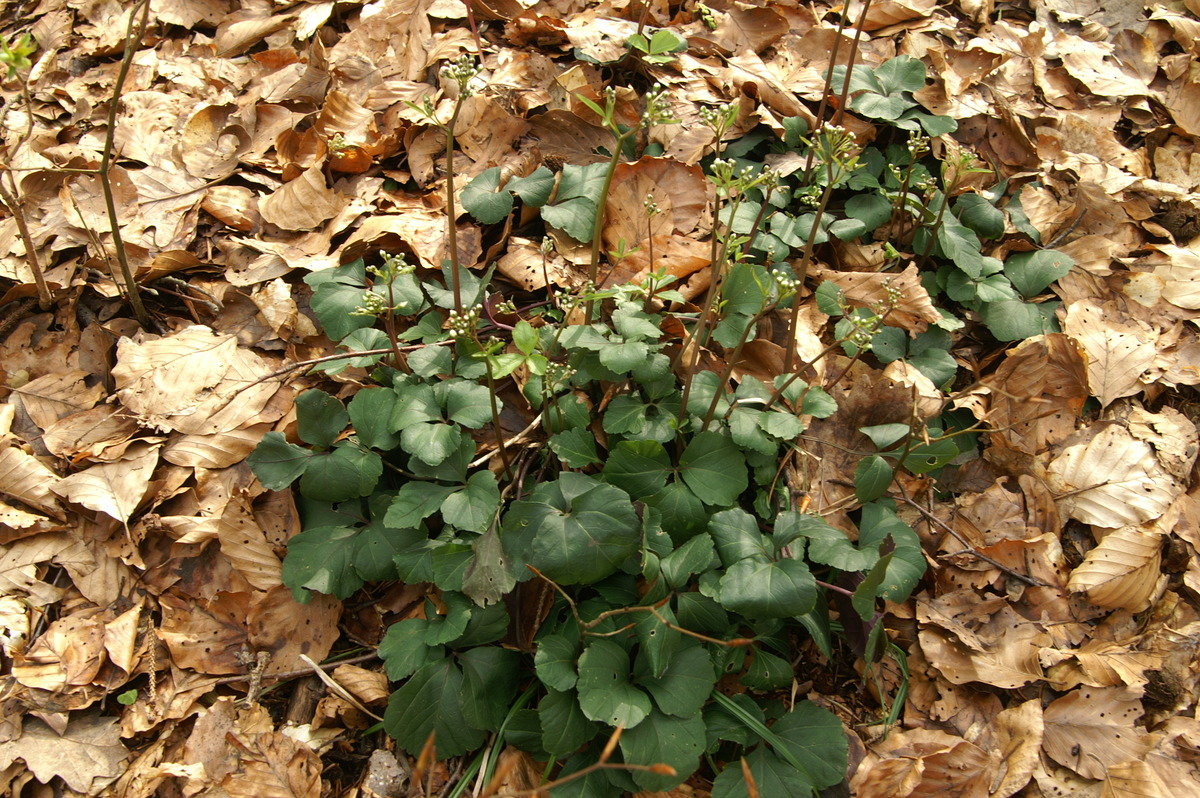
Habit

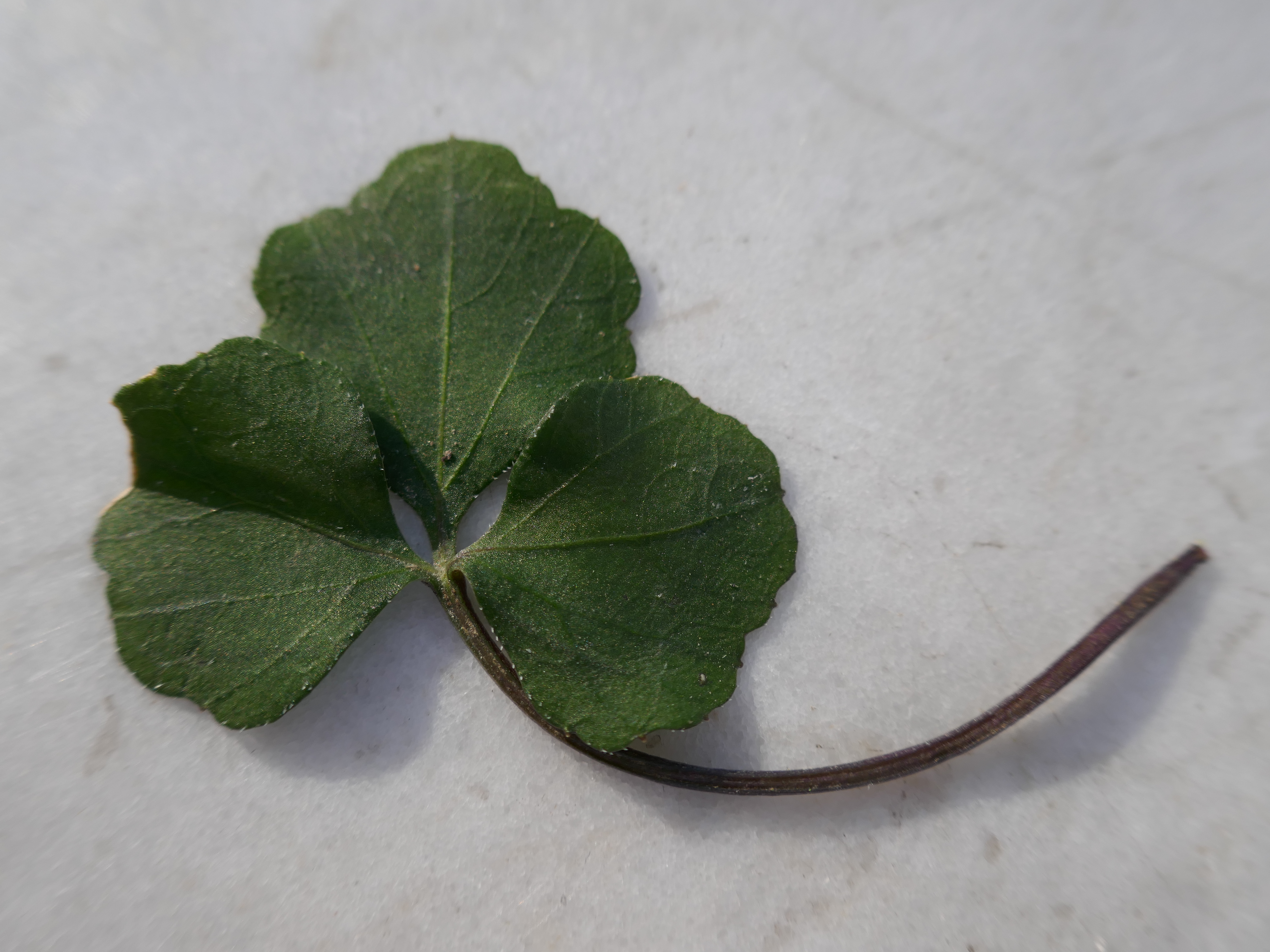
Leaf
