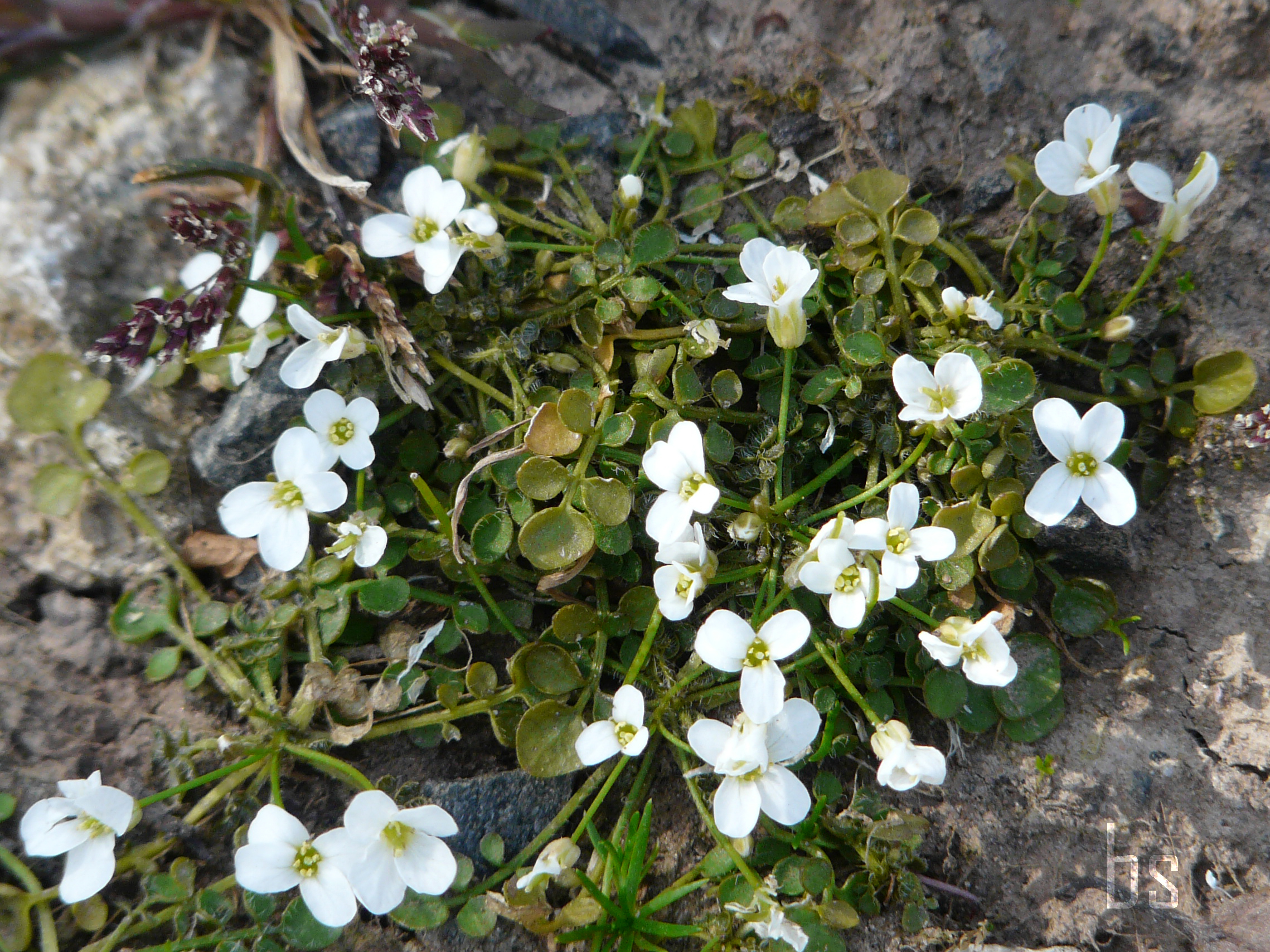
- Flowers

Scientific classification
- Kingdom: Plantae
- Clade: Tracheophytes
- Clade: Angiosperms
- Clade: Eudicots
- Clade: Rosids
- Order: Brassicales
- Family: Brassicaceae
- Genus: Cardamine
- Species: C. corymbosa

Binomial name
- Cardamine corymbosa Hook.f.

Synonyms
- Cardamine hirsuta var. corymbosa (Hook.f.) Hook.f.

= Cardamine corymbosa =

New Zealand bitter-cress

Species of flowering plant in the cabbage family

Cardamine corymbosa, commonly known as the New Zealand bitter-cress, is a flowering plant in the family Brassicaceae. Native to the subantarctic islands of Australasia, it has become an invasive species in plant nurseries. The specific epithet refers to the structure of the inflorescence.

== Description ==
New Zealand bittercress was described by Joseph Dalton Hooker as "a small and very distinct species of Cardamine, wiry and fragile in every part’". The plant has a low and spreading growth habit with unbranched stems which creep along the ground. It produces daughter plants through rooting at the nodes. The basal, compound leaves have three to five leaflets, with the terminal leaflet being up to twice as large as the lateral ones.

== Distribution and habitat ==
The plant is native to New Zealand’s subantarctic Auckland and Campbell Islands, as well as to Australia’s Macquarie Island, where it occurs in alpine tundra and rocky coastal habitats. It has been accidentally introduced to other parts of the world, including North America and Europe, where it is a weed of nursery crops grown in polytunnels.

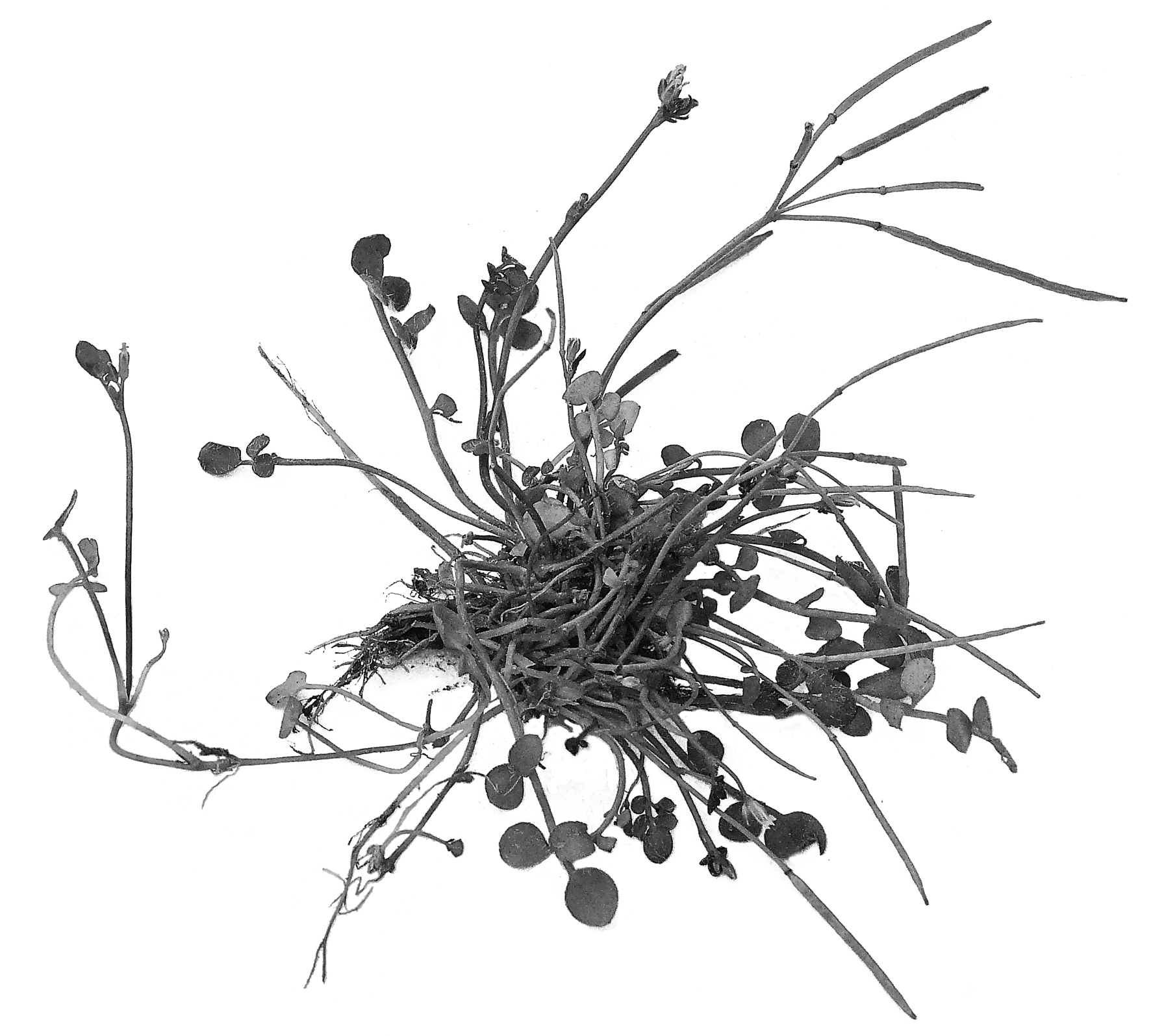
Cardamine corymbosa siliquae (fruits)
