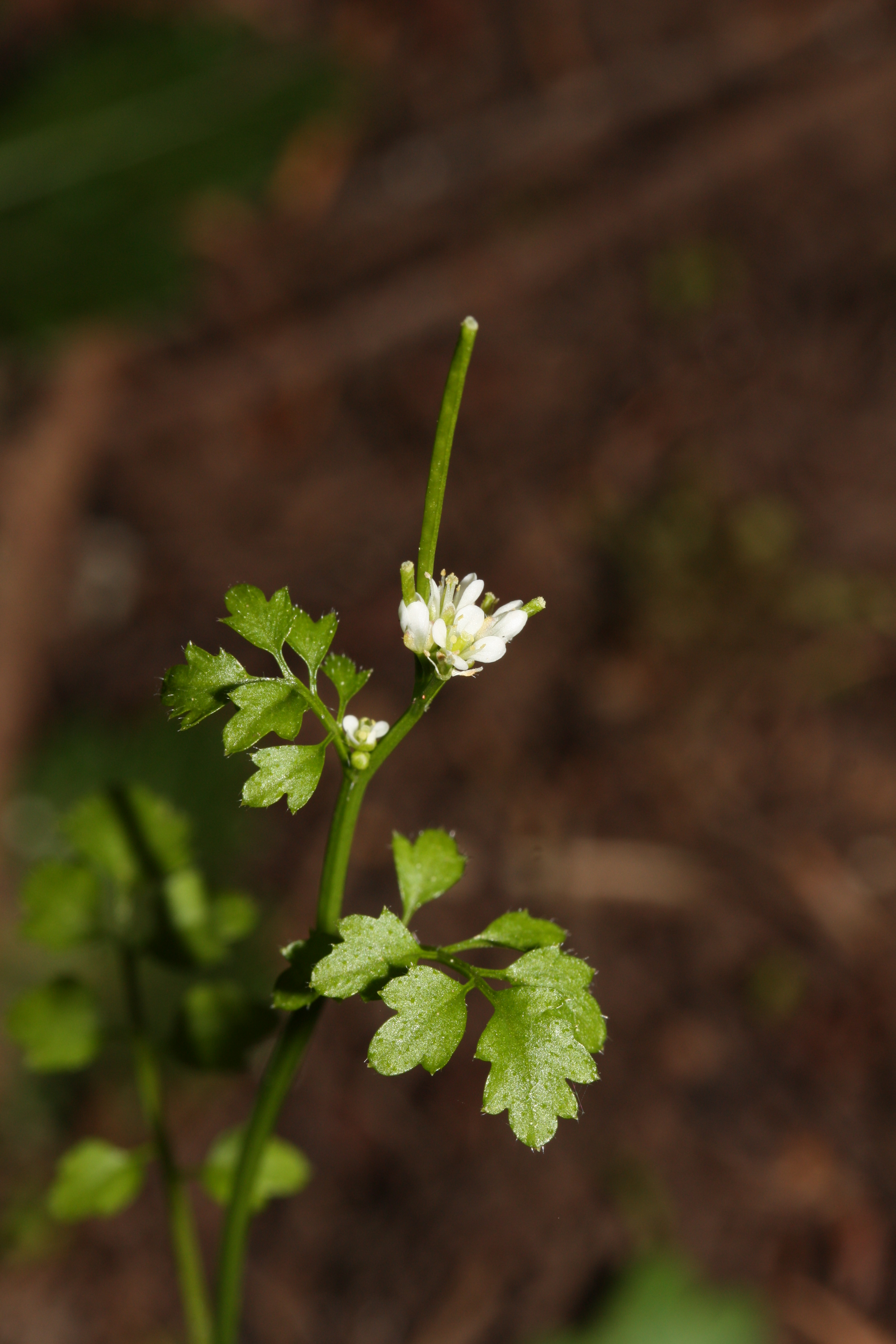

Conservation status
- Secure (NatureServe)

Scientific classification
- Kingdom: Plantae
- Clade: Tracheophytes
- Clade: Angiosperms
- Clade: Eudicots
- Clade: Rosids
- Order: Brassicales
- Family: Brassicaceae
- Genus: Cardamine
- Species: C. oligosperma

Binomial name
- Cardamine oligosperma Nutt.

= Cardamine oligosperma =

Species of flowering plant

Cardamine oligosperma is a species of Cardamine known by the common name little western bittercress, native to western North America.

== Description ==
C. oligosperma is an annual or biennial herb growing from a taproot. It produces one or more upright, branching stems 8–50 centimeters (3–18 inches). The leaves are divided into many leaflets. The plant generally has a large basal rosette and smaller leaves further up the stem, each with 5–9 nearly round leaflets. Most prominently blooming in early spring and early autumn, the inflorescence is several centimeters long and bears many flowers with white petals just a few millimeters in length. The fruit is a silique (pod) up to 2.5 cm (1 in) long, containing 15–22 seeds.

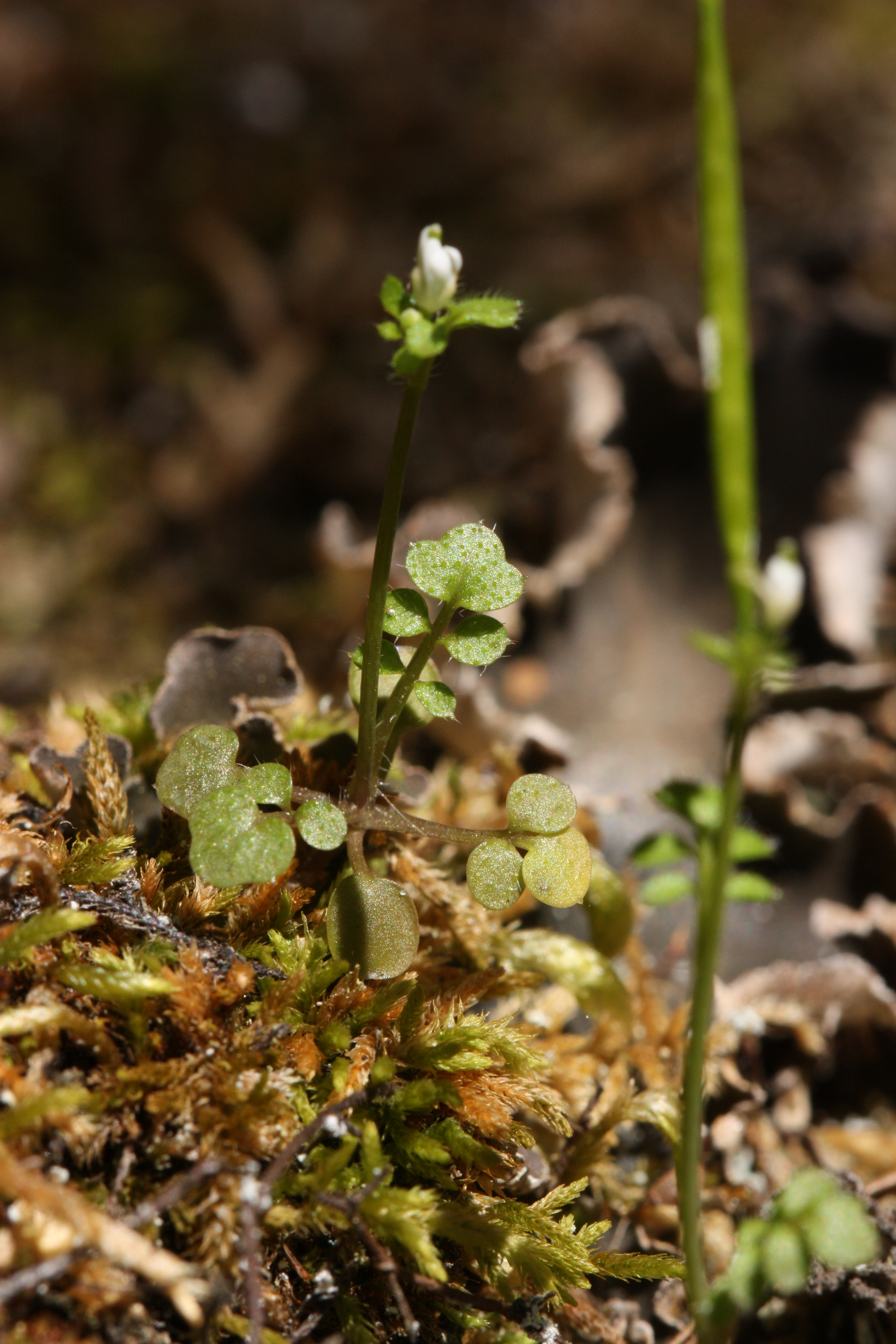
New shoot

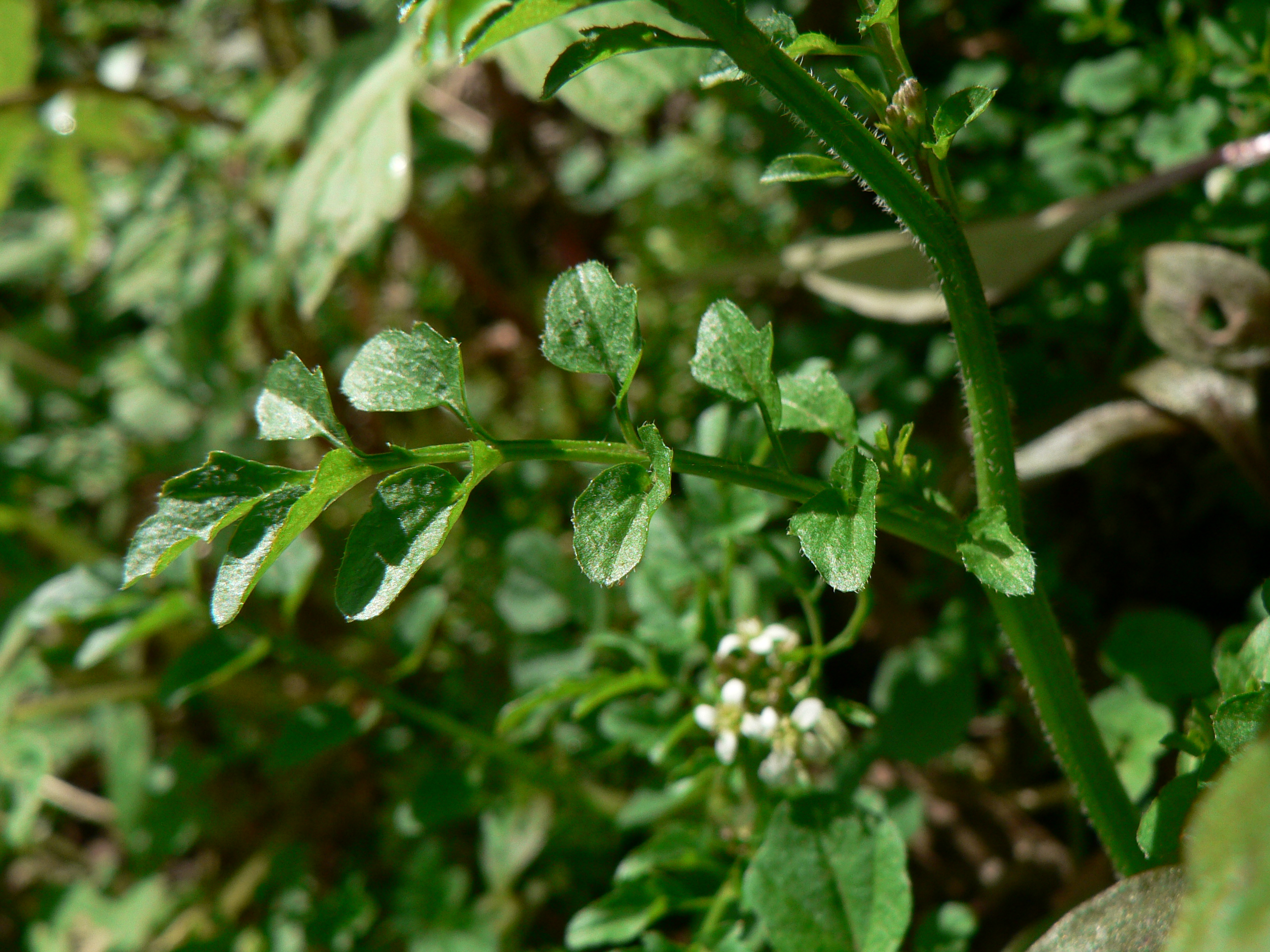
Leaves closer to base

== Taxonomy ==
Oligosperma is Greek for 'few seeds'. Common names include snapweed and shotweed for the plant's tendency to throw seeds when touched.

== Distribution and habitat ==
It is native to western North America from Alaska to California to Colorado, where it grows in moist mountain habitats.

== Toxicity ==
The plant often throws its seeds when touched, which can cause irritation if they contact the eyes. Younger, more succulent plants are less likely to be carrying seeds.

== Uses ==
The leaves are edible raw and other tender parts of the plant can be cooked, though have also been eaten raw.
