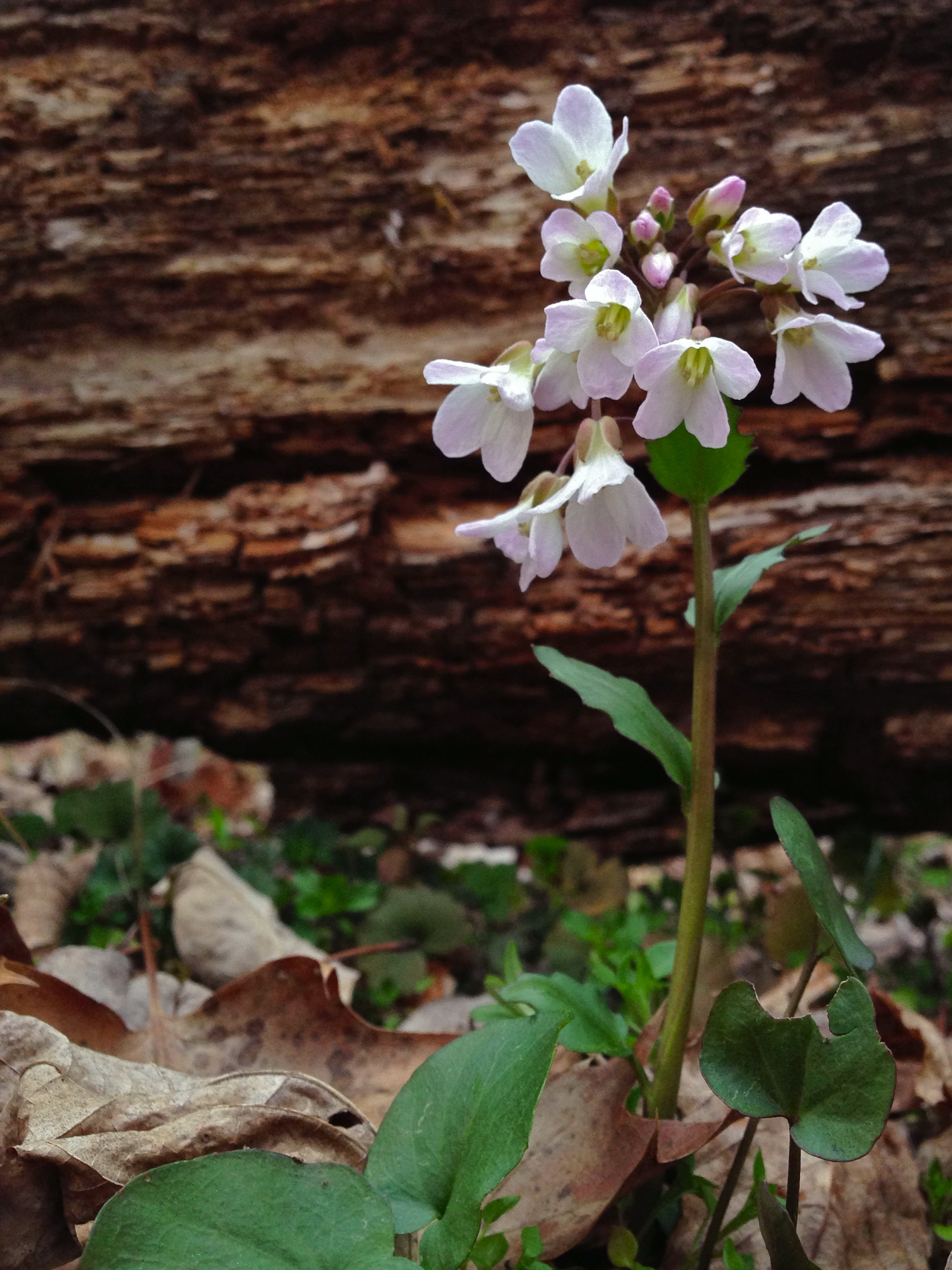

Scientific classification
- Kingdom: Plantae
- Clade: Embryophytes
- Clade: Tracheophytes
- Clade: Angiosperms
- Clade: Eudicots
- Clade: Rosids
- Order: Brassicales
- Family: Brassicaceae
- Genus: Cardamine
- Species: C. douglassii

Binomial name
- Cardamine douglassii Britton

Synonyms
- Arabis douglassii Torr.; Thlaspi tuberosum Nutt.; Arabis rhomboidea var. purpurea Torr.; Cardamine rhomboidea f. purpurea (Torr.) O.E.Schulz; Cardamine rhomboidea var. purpurea (Torr.); Dentaria douglassii (Britton) Greene; Cardamine douglassii f. albidula Farw.; Thlaspi tuberosum Nutt.

= Cardamine douglassii =

Species of flowering plant in the cabbage family

Cardamine douglassii, the limestone bittercress or purple cress, is a perennial forb that produces white to pink or purple flowers in early spring. It is native to Ontario, Canada, as well as the eastern and central United States.

== Description ==
Cardamine douglassii has an erect unbranched stem which is 10–25 centimetres (4–10 inches) tall and sparsely to densely hairy. The basal leaves are simple, heart shaped or round, 5–15 cm (2–6 in), borne on 4–12 cm (1 1/2–4 3/4 in) long petioles. There are 3 to 8 oblong to lanceolate leaves on the stem, which are 2–5 cm (3/4–2 in) long and 5 to 25 millimetres (1/4 to 1 in) wide. The margins may be smooth or coarsely toothed.

Although colors range from purple to a purplish white, entirely white petals are rare among this species. The flowers are borne in a raceme and are typically born from mid-March to late April. The petals are 7 to 15 mm (1/4 to 1/2 in) long and 3 to 5 mm wide. The fruit is linear, 1.5–4 cm (1/2–1 1/2 in) long and 1.5 to 2 mm wide.

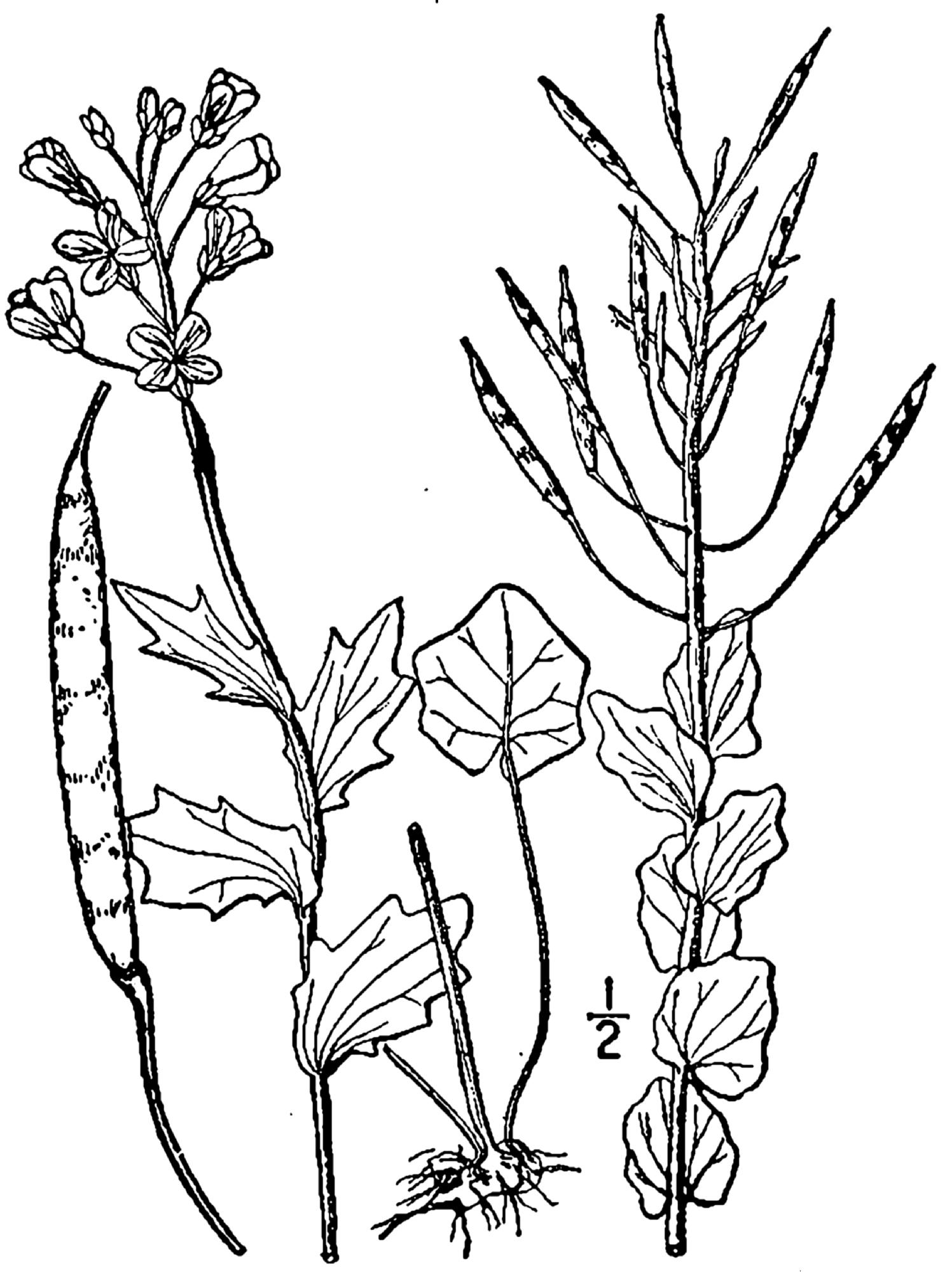
1913 botanical illustration

== Distribution and habitat ==
Cardamine douglassii is widely distributed in Ontario and the eastern and central United States, although local distribution may be spotty. It ranges from Massachusetts west to Ontario, Minnesota, and Missouri south as far as Arkansas, Alabama, and the Carolinas. Cardamine douglassii is listed as an endangered species by the Commonwealth of Massachusetts, and as a species of special concern by the State of Connecticut. In Virginia, it grows in habitats such as swamps and forests, generally with base rich soils. The presence of this species is dependent on appropriate habitat, and it may be eliminated from an area by development, changes in land use, or competition with invasive species.
