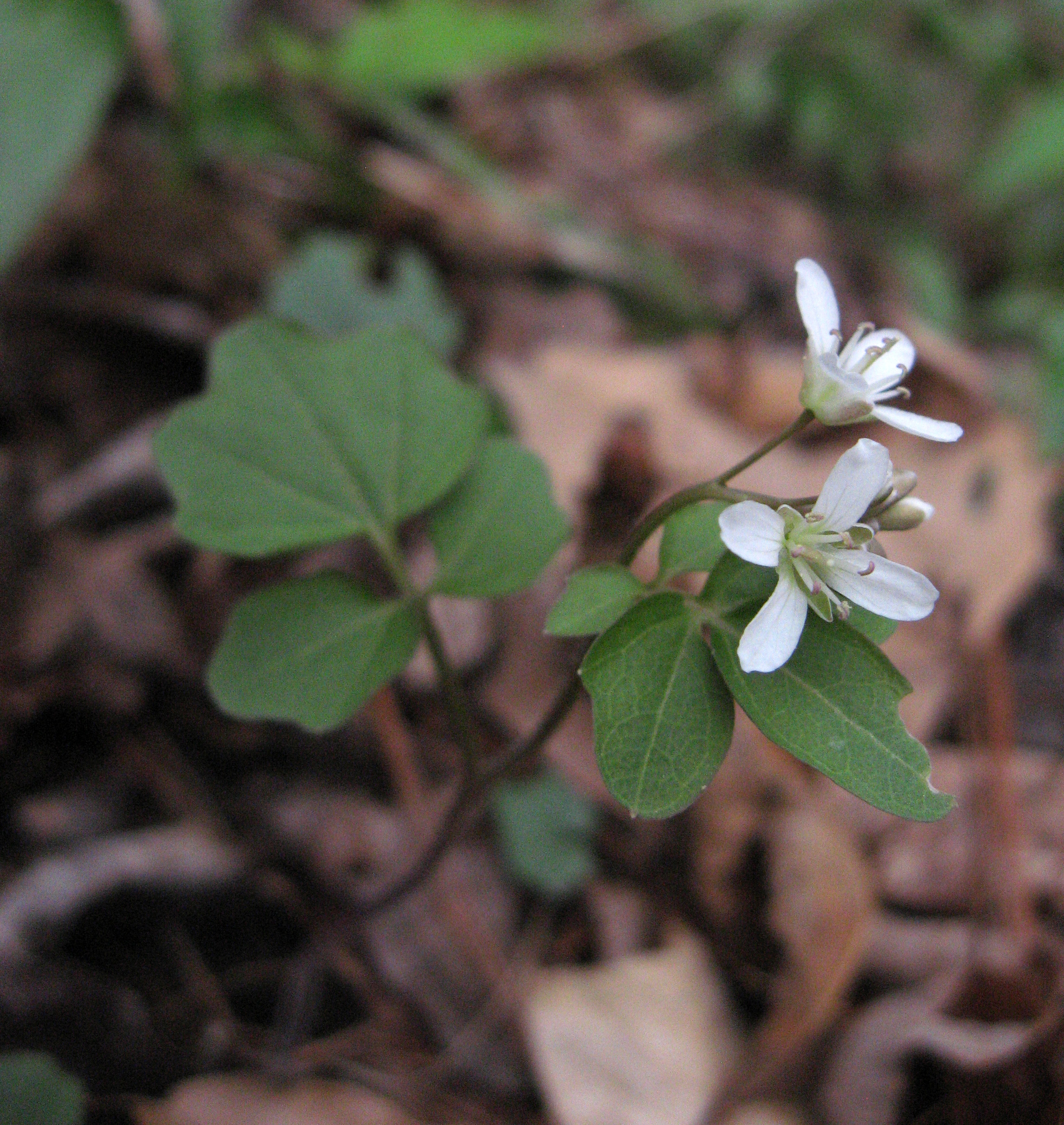

Conservation status
- Vulnerable (NatureServe)

Scientific classification
- Kingdom: Plantae
- Clade: Tracheophytes
- Clade: Angiosperms
- Clade: Eudicots
- Clade: Rosids
- Order: Brassicales
- Family: Brassicaceae
- Genus: Cardamine
- Species: C. flagellifera

Binomial name
- Cardamine flagellifera O.E.Schulz

= Cardamine flagellifera =

Species of flowering plant

Cardamine flagellifera, commonly known as Blue Ridge bittercress, is a species of herbaceous plant in the mustard family. It is native to eastern North America, where it is found primarily in the southern Blue Ridge. It is a perennial that produces white flowers in the spring.

Its natural habitat is moist cove forests and bottomlands, along streambanks and in seepage areas. Unlike the similar-looking Cardamine clematis which grows in high elevations, C. flagellifera is typically found in low to moderate elevations.

This species is considered to be vulnerable due to its limited distribution, and its habitat requirement of forests with an undistributed herbaceous layer.

== Taxonomy ==
Two varieties are sometimes recognized. These are:

- C. flagellifera var. flagellifera - Large-flowered Blue Ridge bittercress; widespread in the southern Appalachian Mountains.
- C. flagellifera var. hugeri - Small-flowered Blue Ridge bittercress; has a more restricted range.
