= Cardamine occidentalis =

Big western bittercress

Scientific classification
- Kingdom: Plantae
- Clade: Tracheophytes
- Clade: Angiosperms
- Clade: Eudicots
- Clade: Rosids
- Order: Brassicales
- Family: Brassicaceae
- Genus: Cardamine
- Species: C. occidentalis

Binomial name
- Cardamine occidentalis (S.Wats. ex B.L.Rob.) Howell

Species of flowering plant

Cardamine occidentalis is a species of Cardamine known by the common name big western bittercress. It is native to western North America from Alaska to northwestern California, where it grows in moist mountain habitats.

== Description ==
Cardamine occidentalis is a perennial herb growing from very small rhizomes. It produces a branching erect or leaning stem which may root at nodes. There is a basal array of leaves, each on a petiole and divided into many leaflets. There are also several leaves along the stem. The flower has white petals each a few millimeters long. The fruit is a silique 2 to 3 centimeters long.
