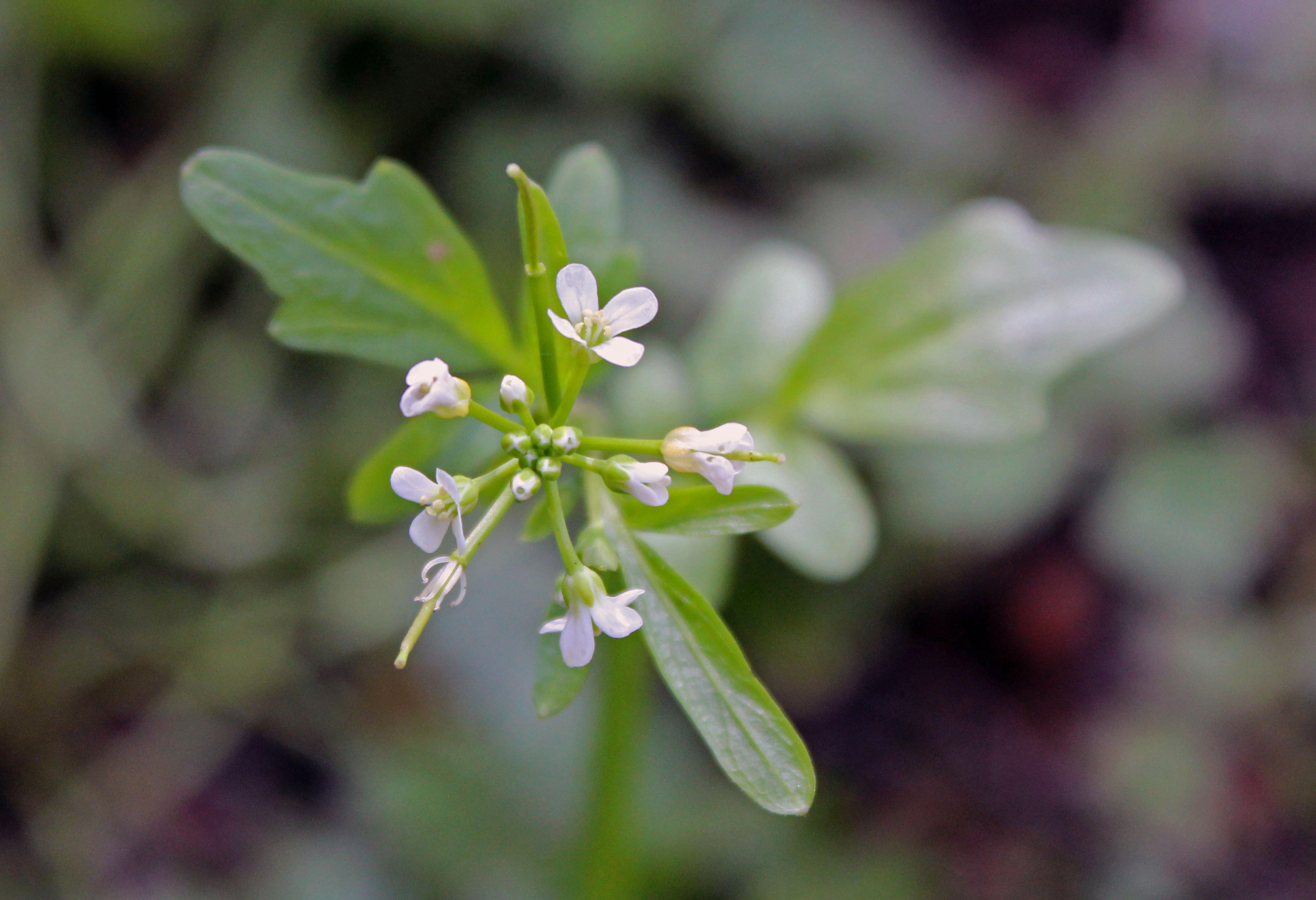

Conservation status
- Secure (NatureServe)

Scientific classification
- Kingdom: Plantae
- Clade: Tracheophytes
- Clade: Angiosperms
- Clade: Eudicots
- Clade: Rosids
- Order: Brassicales
- Family: Brassicaceae
- Genus: Cardamine
- Species: C. angulata

Binomial name
- Cardamine angulata Hook, 1892

= Cardamine angulata =

Species of flowering plant

Cardamine angulata is a species of perennial rhizomatous forb known by the common names angled bittercress, seaside bittercress, and angle-leaved bittercress. The species is endemic to the western United States and British Columbia.

== Description ==
Angled bittercress has a tall, slender stem ranging from 2 to 8 mm (0.08 to 0.31 in) in diameter. The stem can be glabrous or pubescent, and there are commonly stiff hairs along the base of the main stem. The leaves are palmately divided, with 3 to 5 egg- or lance-shaped toothed or lobed leaflets. The leaves range from 1.5 to 7.62 cm (0.59 to 3 in) in length, and the terminal leaflet is the largest. The flower petals are 8 to 15 mm (0.31 to 0.6 in) in length and 4 to 8 mm (0.16 to 0.31 in) in width, obovate, with rounded or notched tips. They may range from white to pinkish in color. The fruits are flat, linear, and erect or ascending. They range from 1.5 to 4 cm (0.6 to 1.6 in) in length and 1.4 to 2 mm (0.06 to 0.08 in) in width. The plant can reach up to 3 feet in height.

The plant flowers from April to June.

== Range and habitat ==
The angled bittercress can be found throughout California, Oregon, Washington, British Columbia, and Alaska. While the species is listed as secure at the global level, it is ranked as critically imperiled in Alaska and vulnerable in British Columbia and California.

Angled bittercress is a facultative wetland (FACW) species, and is most commonly found in riparian and wetland environments. This includes wetlands, stream banks, moist woods, wet meadows, and shady, shrubby forests. The species prefers cool mesothermal climates.
