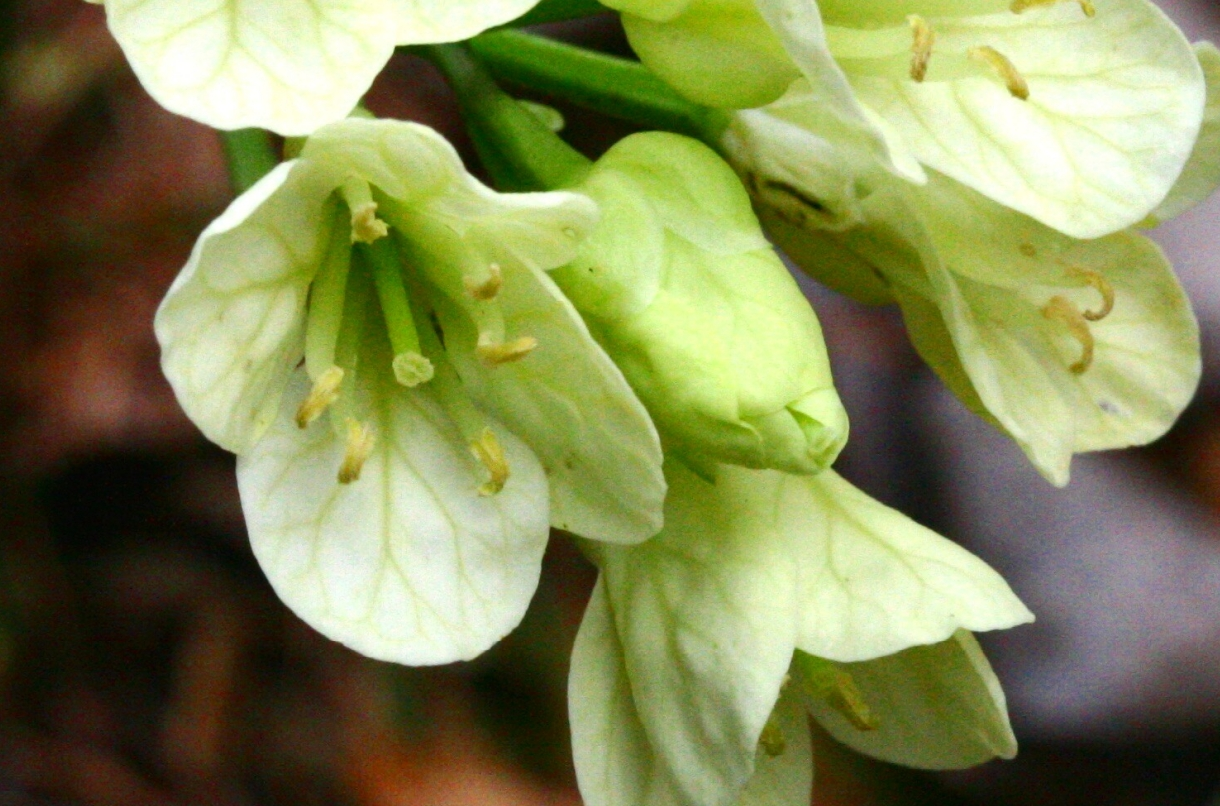
- Close-up of flowers
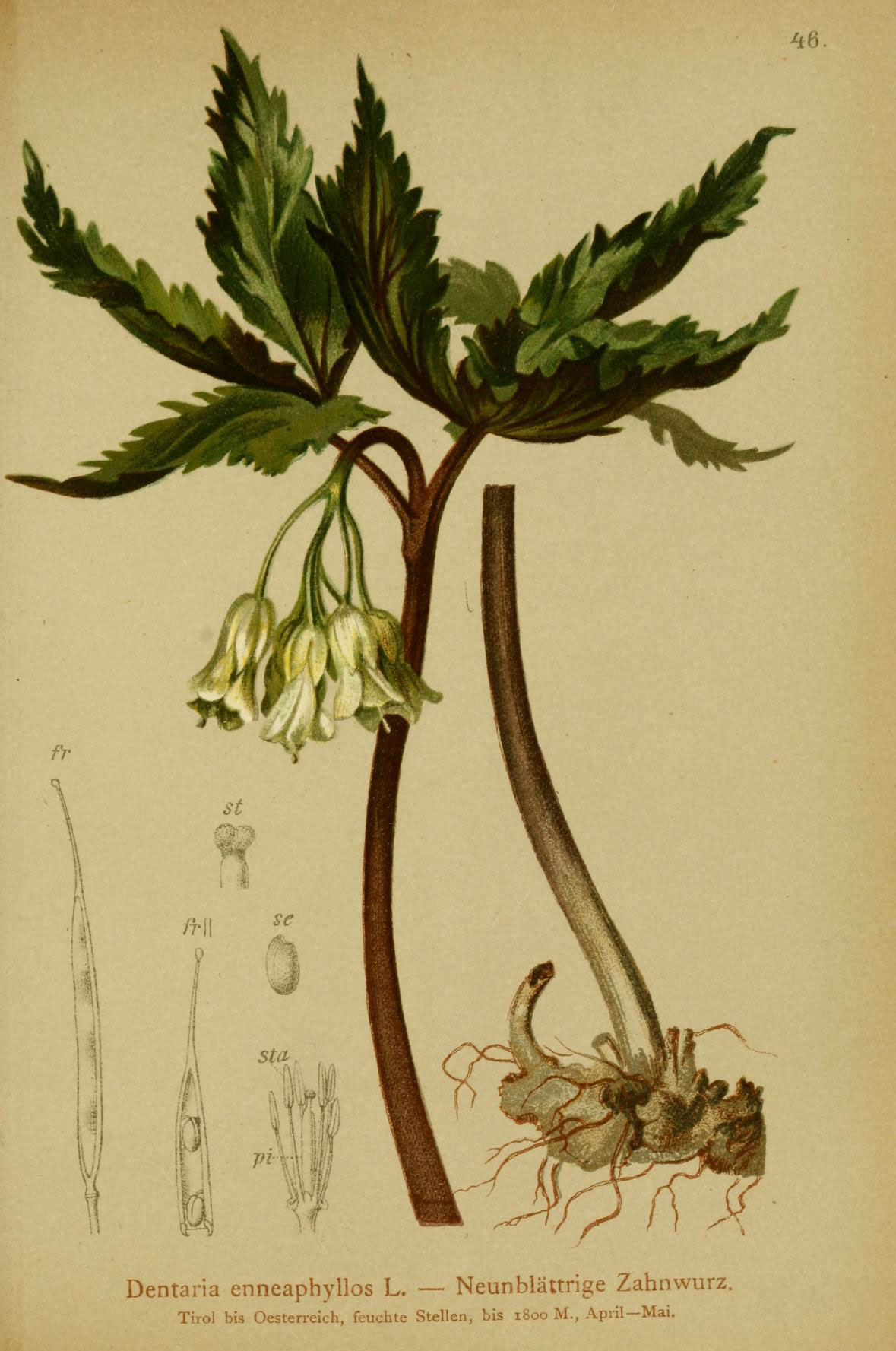
- Botanical illustration

Scientific classification
- Kingdom: Plantae
- Clade: Tracheophytes
- Clade: Angiosperms
- Clade: Eudicots
- Clade: Rosids
- Order: Brassicales
- Family: Brassicaceae
- Genus: Cardamine
- Species: C. enneaphyllos

Binomial name
- Cardamine enneaphyllos (L.) Crantz

Synonyms
- List: Cardamine enneaphylla W.T.Aiton; Cardamine enneaphyllos var. alternifolia (Hausm.) O.E.Schulz; Cardamine enneaphyllos f. angustisecta (Glaab) O.E.Schulz; Cardamine enneaphyllos var. simplicifolia O.E.Schulz; Crucifera enneaphyllos (L.) E.H.L.Krause; Dentaria enneaphyllos L.; Dentaria enneaphyllos f. alternifolia Hausm.; Dentaria enneaphyllos var. angustisecta Glaab; Turritis enneaphyllos Scop. ex Steud.

= Cardamine enneaphyllos =

Species of plant

Cardamine enneaphyllos (syn. Dentaria enneaphyllos), the nine-leaved toothwort, nine-leaved coralwort, or drooping bittercress, is a species of flowering plant in the family Brassicaceae, native to east-central Europe (except Switzerland and the low countries), and on into Italy and the Balkans. A spreading rhizomatous geophyte, it prefers shady situations.

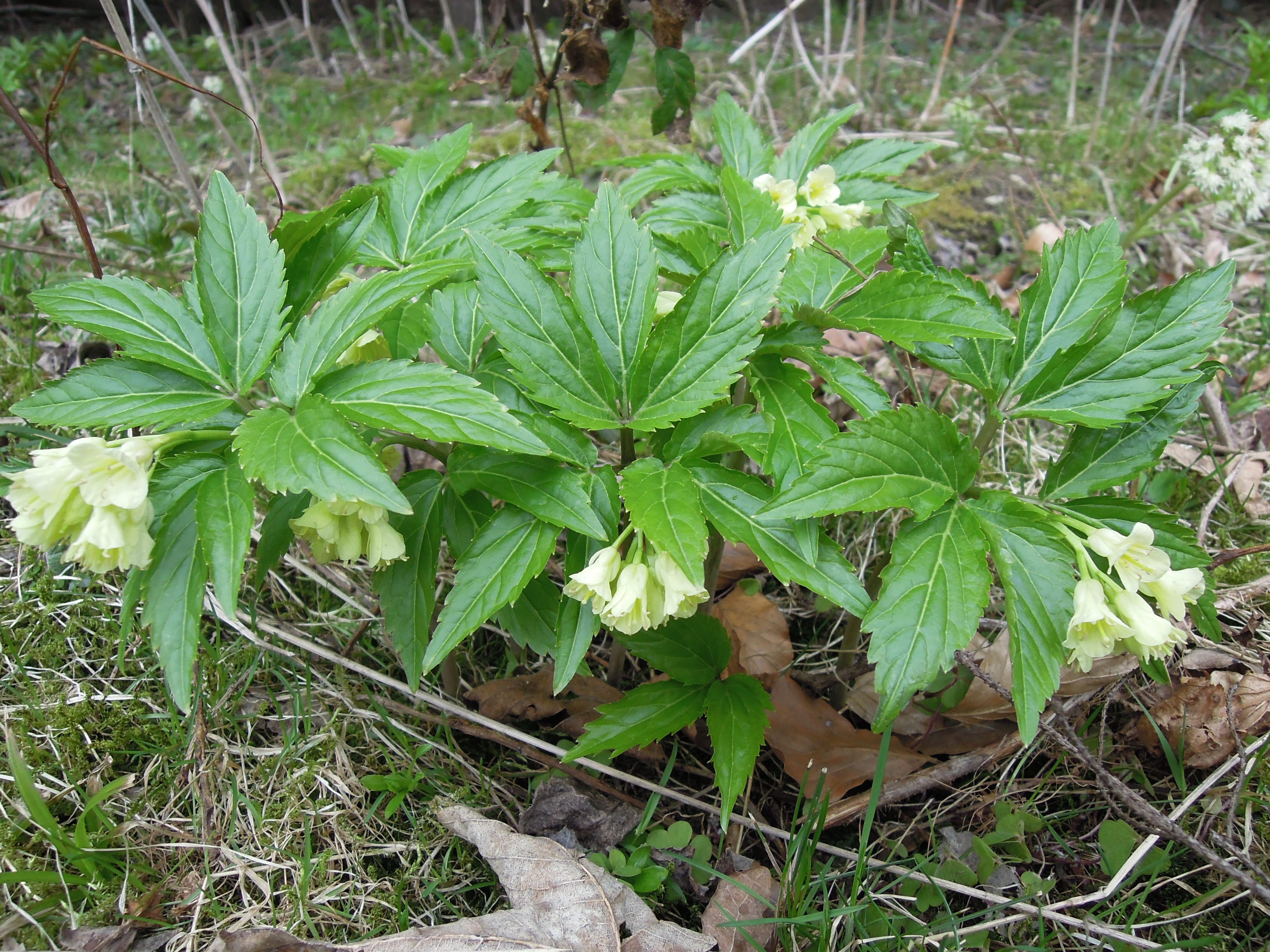
Habit

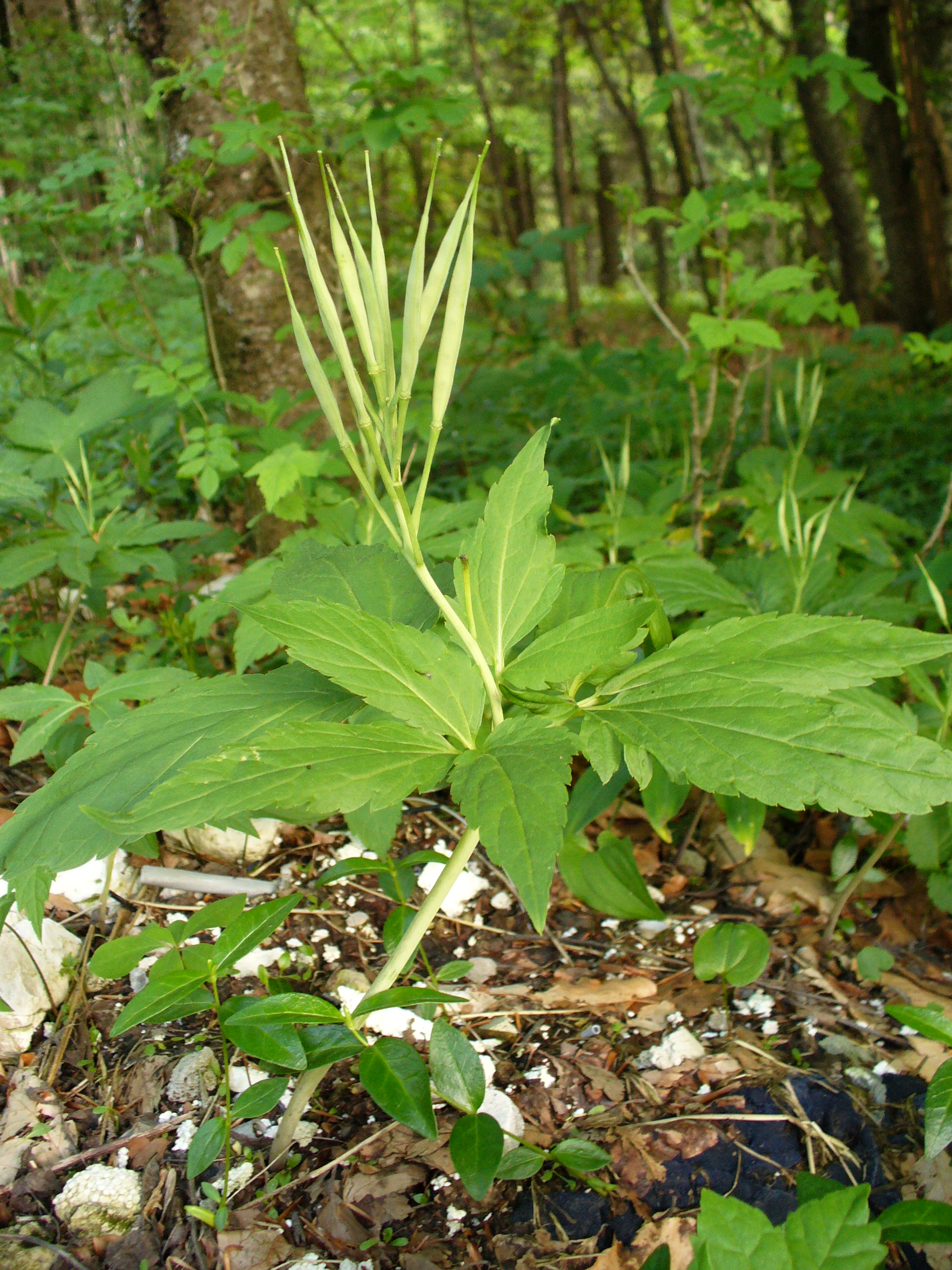
Fruit are siliques
