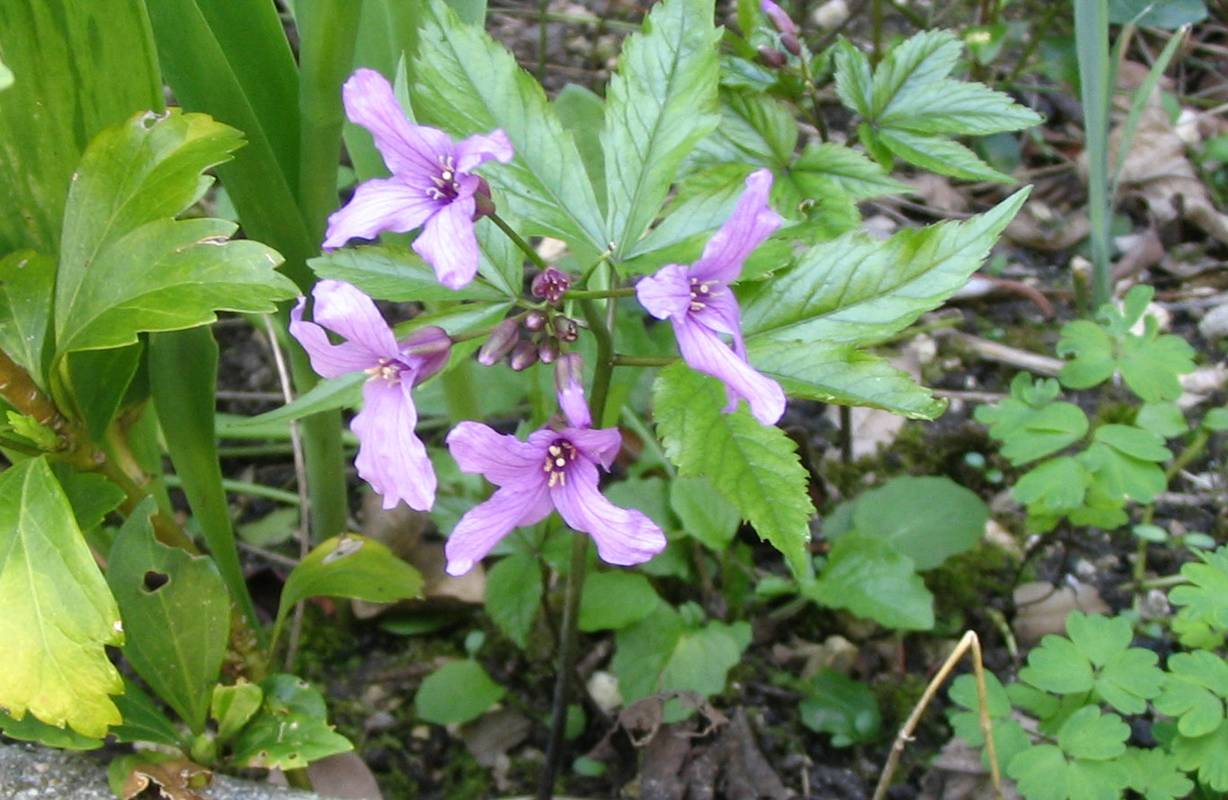

Scientific classification
- Kingdom: Plantae
- Clade: Tracheophytes
- Clade: Angiosperms
- Clade: Eudicots
- Clade: Rosids
- Order: Brassicales
- Family: Brassicaceae
- Genus: Cardamine
- Species: C. pentaphyllos

Binomial name
- Cardamine pentaphyllos (L.) Crantz

= Cardamine pentaphyllos =

Species of flowering plant in the cabbage family

Cardamine pentaphyllos, the five-leaflet bitter-cress or showy toothwort, is a flowering plant in the family Brassicaceae, native to Western and Central Europe in Slovenia and Croatia. It is an herbaceous perennial, growing to 30–50 cm (12–20 in), with palmate leaves and racemes of purple, pink or white flowers in late Spring and early Summer.

The Latin specific epithet pentaphyllos means "with five-lobed leaves". The feminine form pentaphylla is sometimes seen, but this is deemed incorrect.

This plant has gained the Royal Horticultural Society's Award of Garden Merit.
