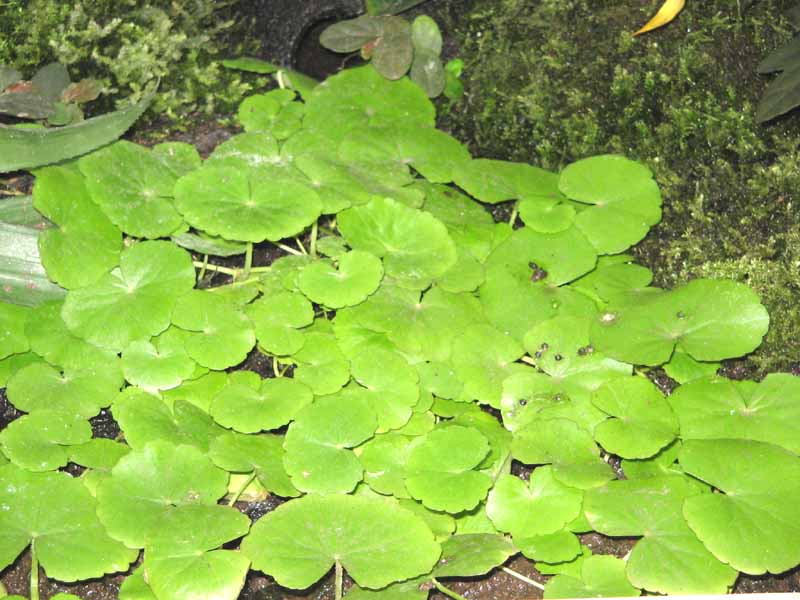

Scientific classification
- Kingdom: Plantae
- Clade: Tracheophytes
- Clade: Angiosperms
- Clade: Eudicots
- Clade: Rosids
- Order: Brassicales
- Family: Brassicaceae
- Genus: Cardamine
- Species: C. lyrata

Binomial name
- Cardamine lyrata Bunge

= Cardamine lyrata =

Species of aquatic plant

Cardamine lyrata, known commonly as Japanese cress and Chinese ivy, is a species of aquatic plant in the mustard family. It is native to the marshes of eastern China and Siberia, as well as Korea and Japan. It flowers from May to June in the wild, with seeds ripening through September. The flowers are bisexual and are pollinated by insects, but are also self-fertile.

The species is cultivated as an aquarium ornamental. It needs a supply of cool, slow-moving water and strong light. It can grow rapidly under the right conditions and makes an attractive, bushy plant. It can be grown in ponds as long as the water temperature does not exceed about 82 °F (28 °C). It propagates easily by cuttings and high levels of carbon dioxide speed growth. Some fish will nibble on the leaves.
