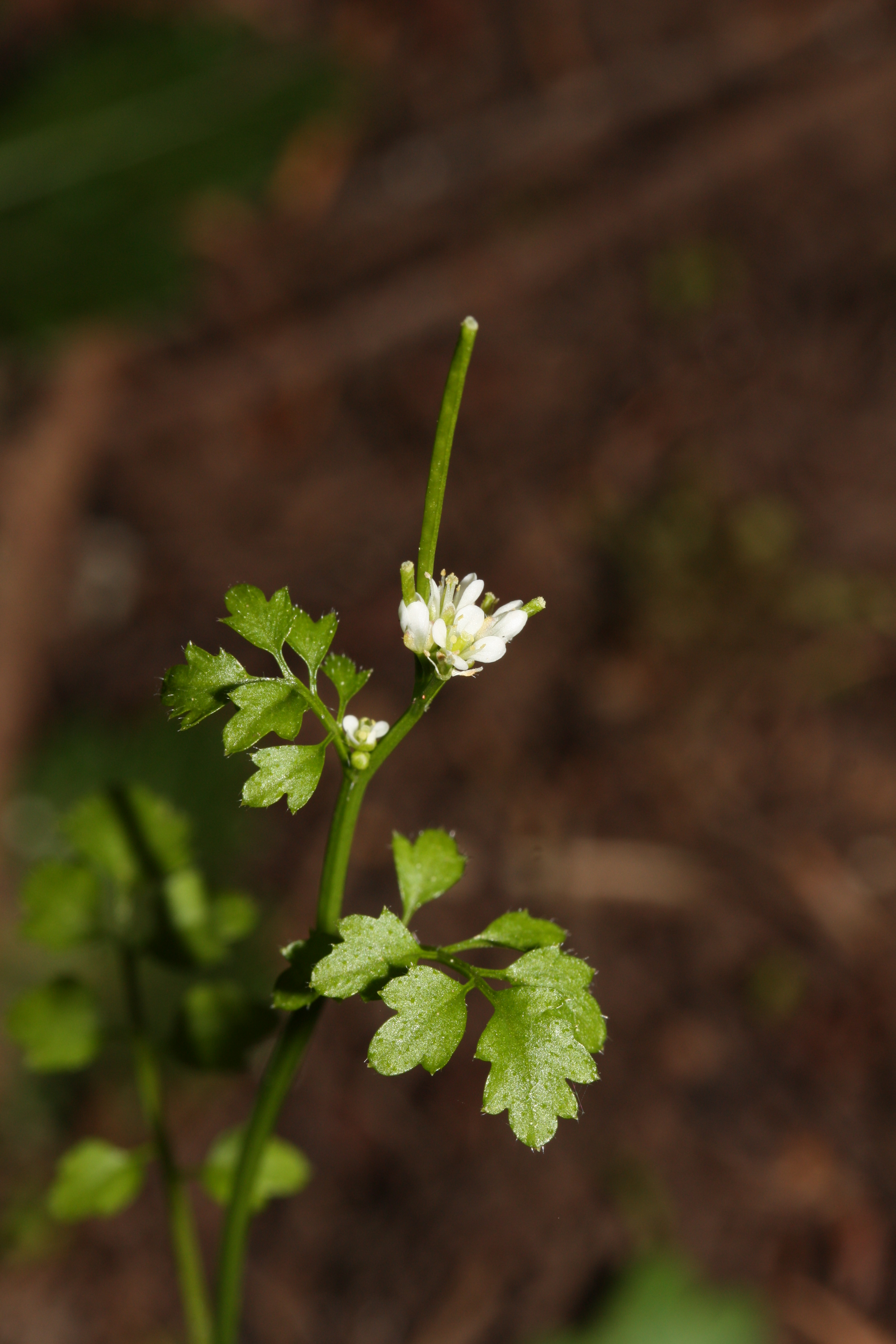
- Cardamine oligosperma

Scientific classification
- Kingdom: Plantae
- Clade: Embryophytes
- Clade: Tracheophytes
- Clade: Angiosperms
- Clade: Eudicots
- Clade: Rosids
- Order: Brassicales
- Family: Brassicaceae
- Tribe: Cardamineae
- Genus: Cardamine; L.

Species
- See list of Cardamine species

Synonyms
- Dentaria Tourn. ex L.; Dracamine Nieuwl.; Ghinia Bubani; Heterocarpus Phil.; Iti Garn.-Jones & P.N.Johnson; Loxostemon Hook.f. & Thomson; Sphaerotorrhiza (O.E.Schulz) A.P.Khokhr.

= Cardamine =

Genus of flowering plants in the cabbage family

Cardamine is a large genus of flowering plants in the mustard family, Brassicaceae, known as bittercresses and toothworts. It contains more than 200 species of annuals and perennials. Species in this genus can be found in diverse habitats worldwide, except the Antarctic. The name Cardamine is derived from the Greek kardaminē, water cress, from kardamon, pepper grass.

== Description ==
The leaves can have different forms, from minute to medium in size. They can be simple, pinnate or bipinnate. They are basal and cauline (growing on the upper part of the stem), with narrow tips. They are rosulate (forming a rosette). The blade margins can be entire, serrate or dentate. The stem internodes lack firmness.

The radially symmetrical flowers grow in a racemose many-flowered inflorescence or in corymbs. The white, pink or purple flowers are minute to medium-sized. The petals are longer than the sepals. The fertile flowers are hermaphroditic.

== Taxonomy ==
The genus Cardamine was first formally named in 1753 by Carl Linnaeus in his Species Plantarum. As of August 2024, there are 264 accepted species in Kew's Plants of the World Online database.

The genus name Dentaria is a commonly used synonym for some species of Cardamine.

== Species ==
Select species include:

- Cardamine amara L. – large bittercress
- Cardamine angulata Hook. – seaside bittercress, angled bittercress
- Cardamine angustata O.E.Schulz – slender toothwort
- Cardamine bellidifolia L. – alpine bittercress, alpine cress
- Cardamine bilobata Kirk
- Cardamine breweri S.Watson – Brewer's bittercress
- Cardamine bulbifera (L.) Crantz – coralroot
- Cardamine bulbosa (Schreb. ex Muhl.) Britton, Sterns & Poggenb. – bulbous bittercress, spring cress
- Cardamine caldeirarum Guthnick ex Seub. – Azorean bittercress
- Cardamine californica (Nutt.) Greene – milkmaids
- Cardamine clematitis Shuttlew. ex S.Watson – small mountain bittercress
- Cardamine concatenata (Michx.) O.Schwarz – cutleaf toothwort, cut-leaved toothwort
- Cardamine constancei Detling – Constance's bittercress
- Cardamine cordifolia A.Gray – heartleaf bittercress, large Mountain bittercress
- Cardamine corymbosa Hook.f. – New Zealand bittercress
- Cardamine debilis DC. – roadside bittercress
- Cardamine diphylla (Michx.) Alph.Wood – crinkleroot, twin-leaved toothwort
- Cardamine dissecta (Leavenw.) Al-Shehbaz – forkleaf toothwort
- Cardamine douglassii Britton – limestone bittercress
- Cardamine enneaphyllos (L.) Crantz – drooping bittercress
- Cardamine fargesiana Al-Shehbaz
- Cardamine flagellifera O.E.Schulz – Blue Ridge bittercress
- Cardamine flexuosa With. – woodland bittercress, wavy bittercress
- Cardamine glacialis (G.Forst.) DC.
- Cardamine gouldii Al-Shehbaz
- Cardamine gunnii Hewson
- Cardamine heptaphylla (Vill.) O.E.Schulz – pinnate coralroot
- Cardamine hirsuta L. – hairy bittercress
- Cardamine impatiens L. – narrowleaf bittercress
- Cardamine jamesonii Hook.
- Cardamine leucantha (Tausch) O.E.Schulz – Korean bittercress
- Cardamine longii Fernald – Long's bittercress
- Cardamine lyrata Bunge
- Cardamine macrocarpa Brandegee – largeseed bittercress
- Cardamine maxima (Nutt.) Alph.Wood – large toothwort
- Cardamine micranthera Rollins – small-anthered bittercress, streambank bittercress
- Cardamine microphylla Adams – small-leaf bittercress
- Cardamine nuttallii Greene – Nuttall's toothwort
- Cardamine nymanii Gand. – lady's smock
- Cardamine occidentalis (S.Watson ex B.L.Rob.) Howell – big western bittercress
- Cardamine oligosperma Nutt. – Idaho bittercress, little western bittercress
- Cardamine pachystigma (S.Watson) Rollins – serpentine bittercress
- Cardamine parviflora L. – sand bittercress, small-flowered bittercress
- Cardamine pattersonii L.F.Hend. – Saddle Mountain bittercress
- Cardamine penduliflora O.E.Schulz – Willamette Valley bittercress
- Cardamine pensylvanica Muhl. ex Willd. – Pennsylvania bittercress, Quaker bittercress
- Cardamine pentaphyllos (L.) Crantz
- Cardamine pratensis L. – cuckoo flower, lady's smock, meadow cress
- Cardamine purpurascens (O.E.Schulz) Al-Shehbaz & al.
- Cardamine purpurea Cham. & Schltdl. – purple bittercress
- Cardamine raphanifolia Pourr. – greater cuckooflower
- Cardamine rotundifolia Michx. – American bittercress, mountain watercress
- Cardamine rupicola (O.E.Schulz) C.L.Hitchc. – cliff bittercress
- Cardamine trifolia L. – trefoil cress
- Cardamine uliginosa M.Bieb.
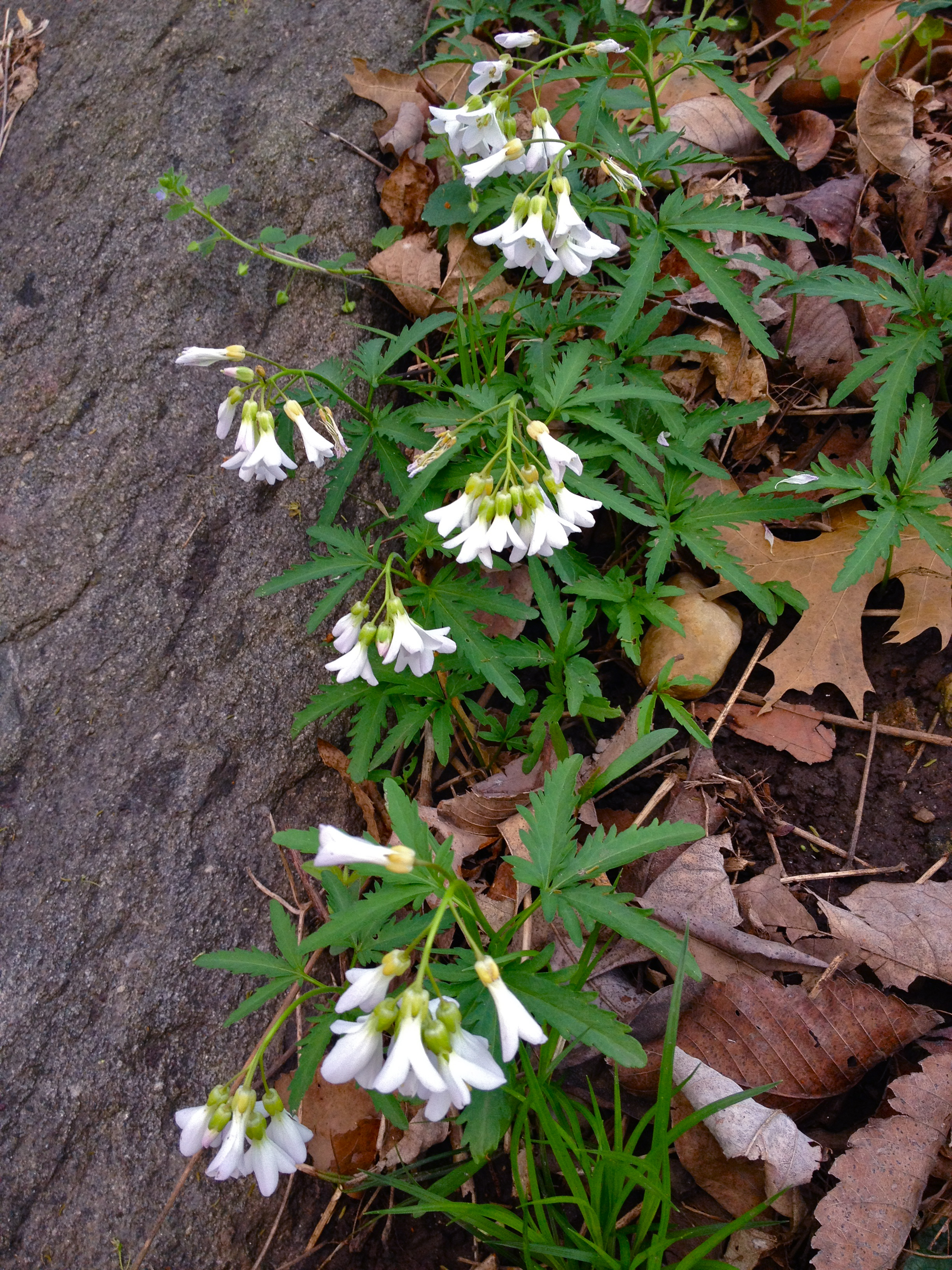
Cardamine concatenata
cutleaf toothwort

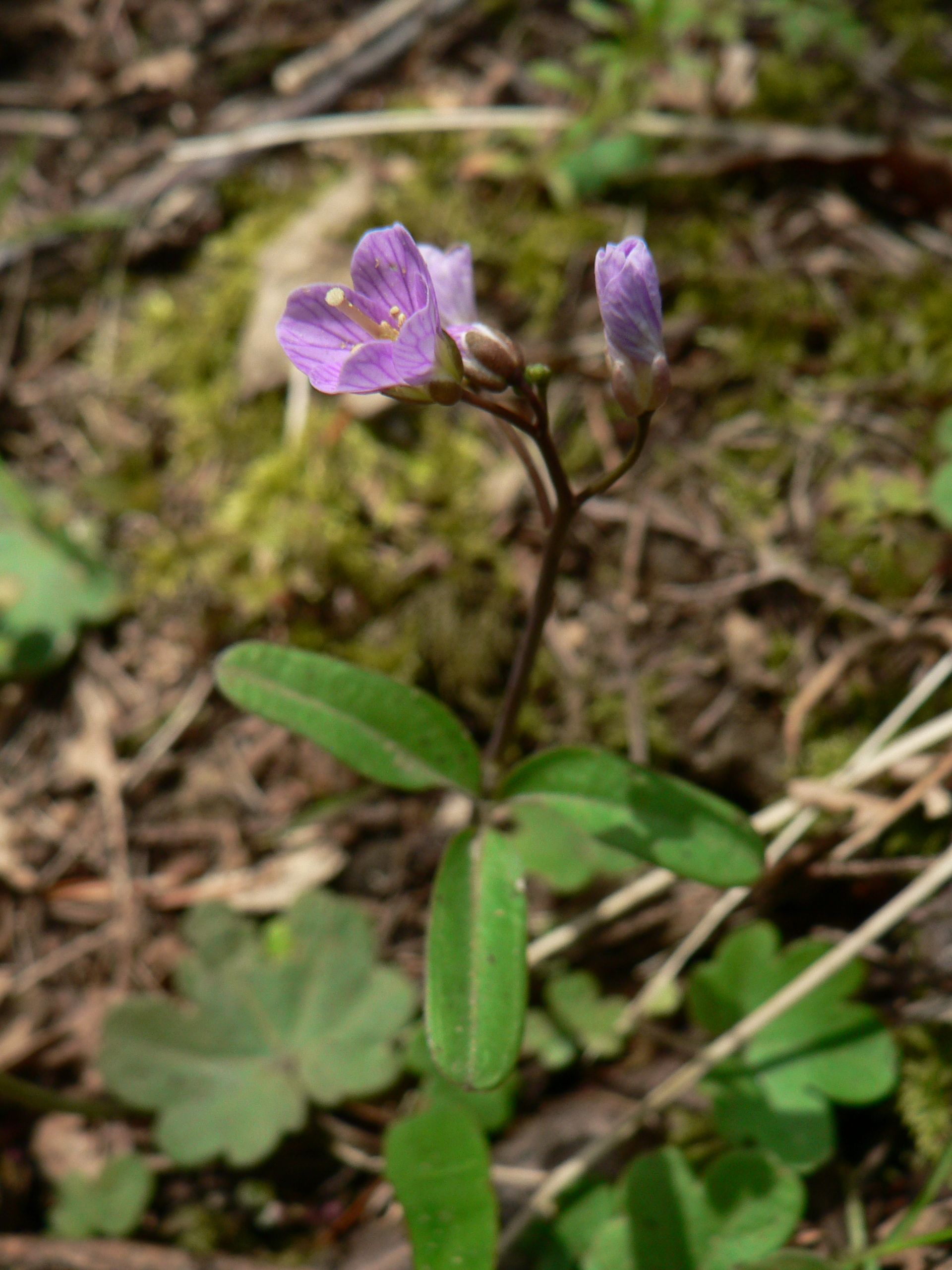
Cardamine nuttallii
Nuttall's toothwort

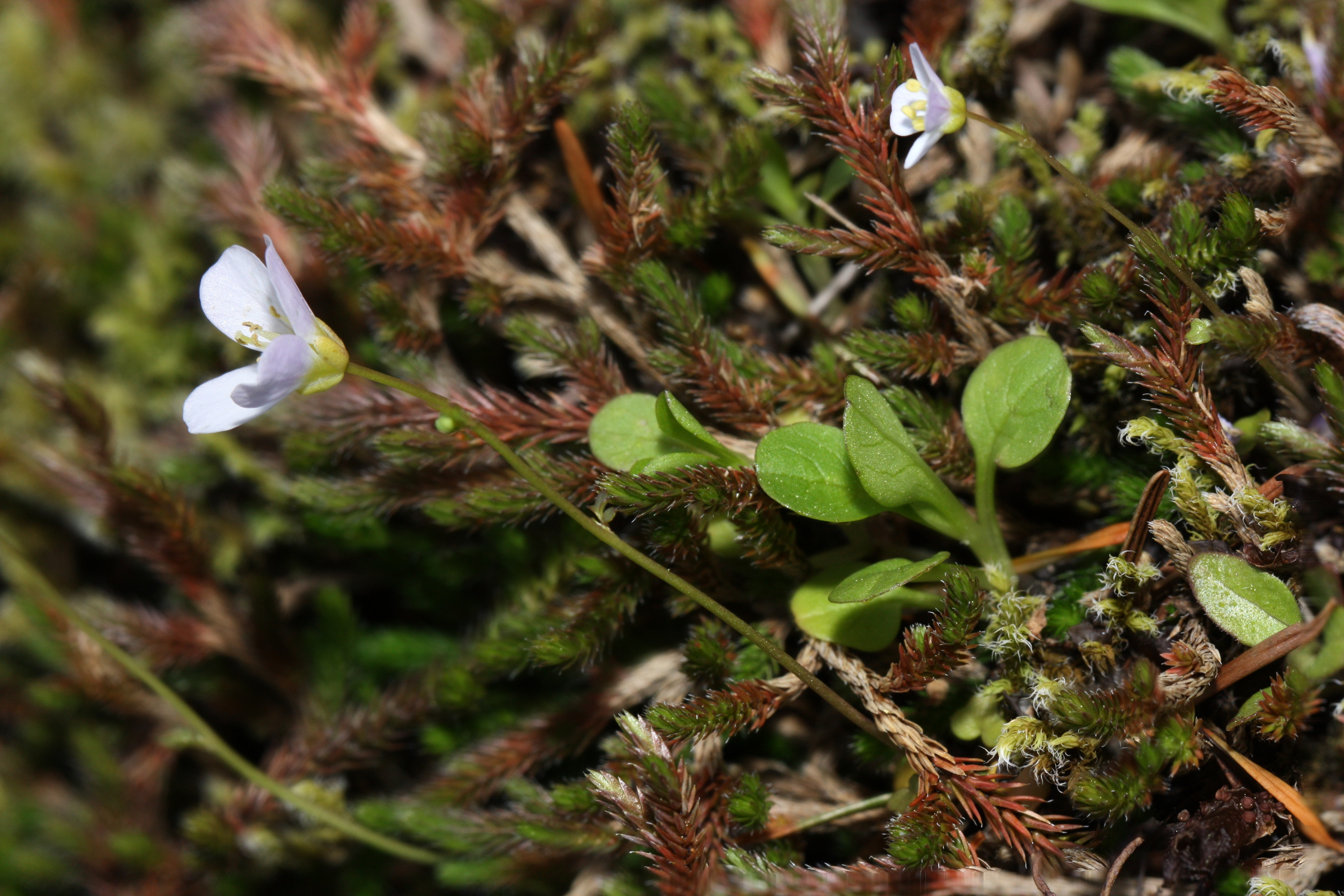
Cardamine pattersonii
Saddle Mountain bittercress

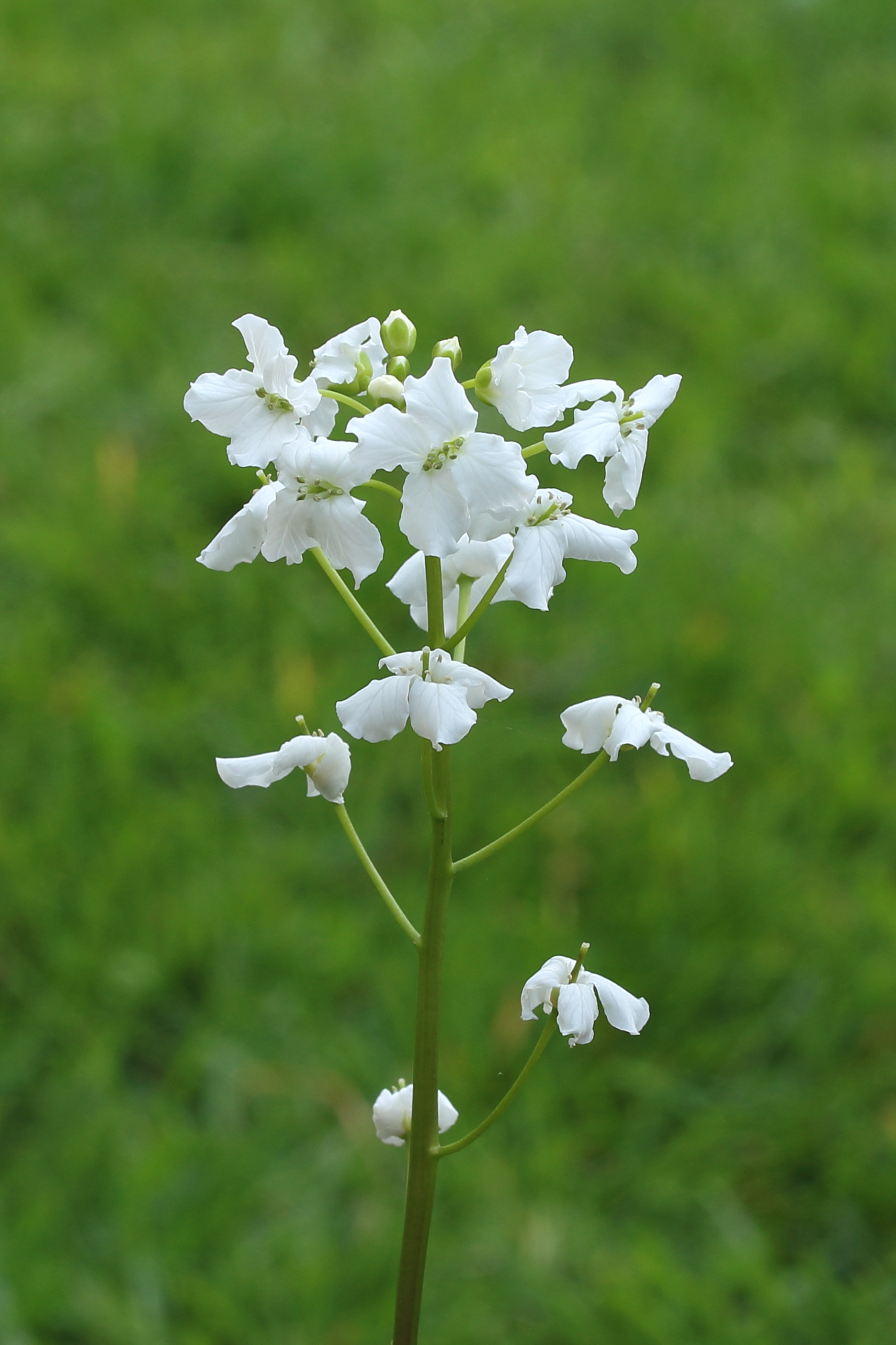
Cardamine trifolia
trefoil bittercress

== Ecology ==
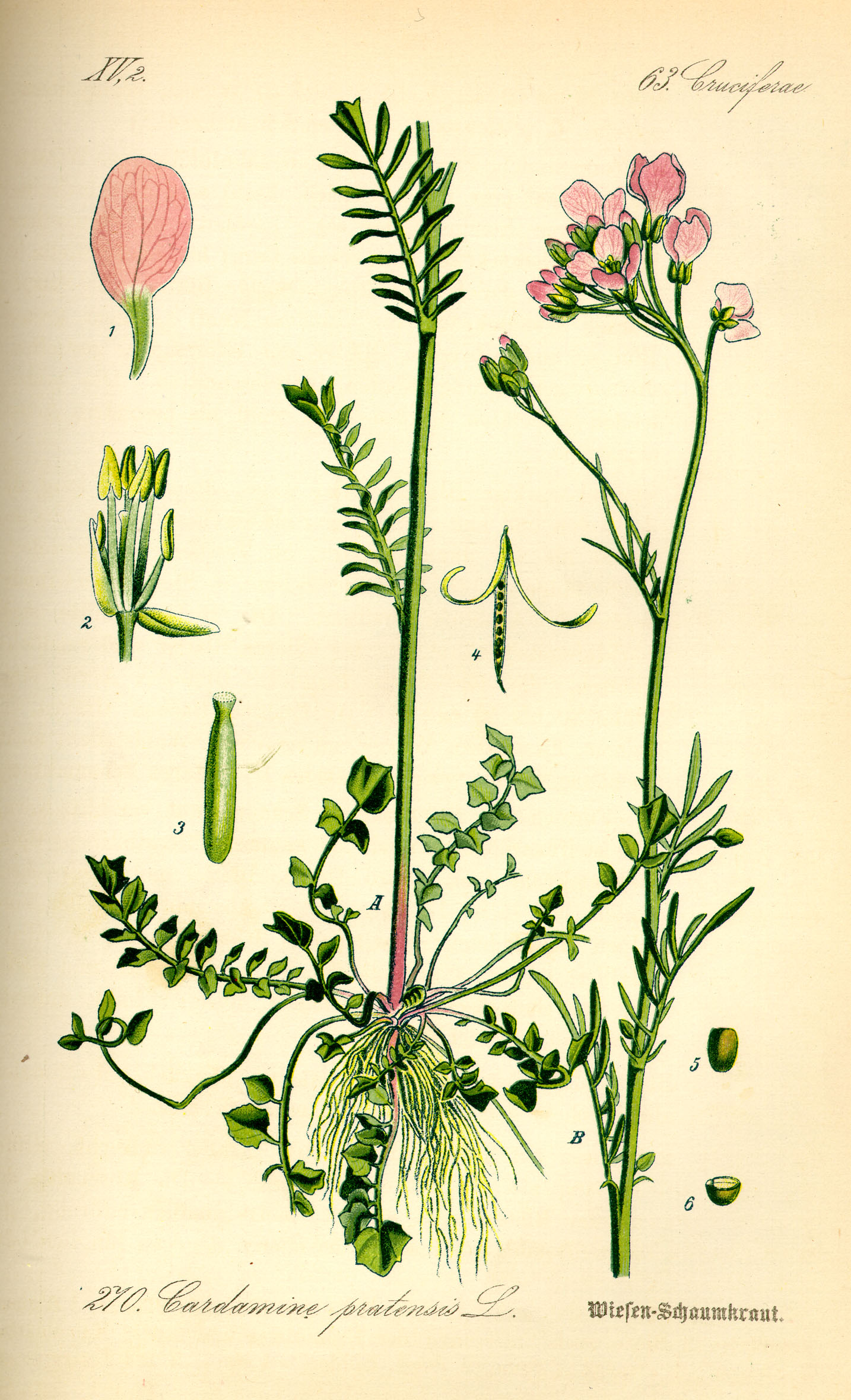
Cardamine pratensis from Thomé: Flora von Deutschland, Österreich und der Schweiz 1885

Certain members of the genus, particularly Cardamine diphylla and Cardamine angustata, and to a lesser extent Cardamine concatenata, are also used as one of the main food sources for the butterfly Pieris oleracea.

== Uses ==
The roots of most species are edible raw.

Some species were reputed to have medicinal qualities (treatment of heart or stomach ailments).

== Bibliography ==
- Al-Shehbaz, Ilsan A.; Marhold, Karol; Lihová, Judita (2020-07-30). "Cardamine". Flora of North America. p. 464.
- Taxonomic Revision of Cardamine
- Lihová, J.; Marhold, K. (2003). "Taxonomy and distribution of the Cardamine pratensis group (Brassicaceae) in Slovenia". Phyton (Horn). 43: 241–261.
- Lihová, J.; Marhold, K.; Neuffer, B. (2000). "Taxonomy of Cardamine amara in the Iberian Peninsula". Taxon. 49 (4): 747–763. doi:10.2307/1223975. JSTOR 1223975. S2CID 85625889.
- Sun, Jianqiang; Shimizu-Inatsugi, Rie; Hofhuis, Hugo; Shimizu, Kentaro; Hay, Angela; Shimizu, Kentaro K.; Sese, Jun (2020). "A recently formed triploid Cardamine insueta inherits leaf vivipary and submergence tolerance traits of parents". Front. Genet. 11 567262. doi:10.3389/fgene.2020.567262. PMC 7573311. PMID 33133153. S2CID 222135582.
