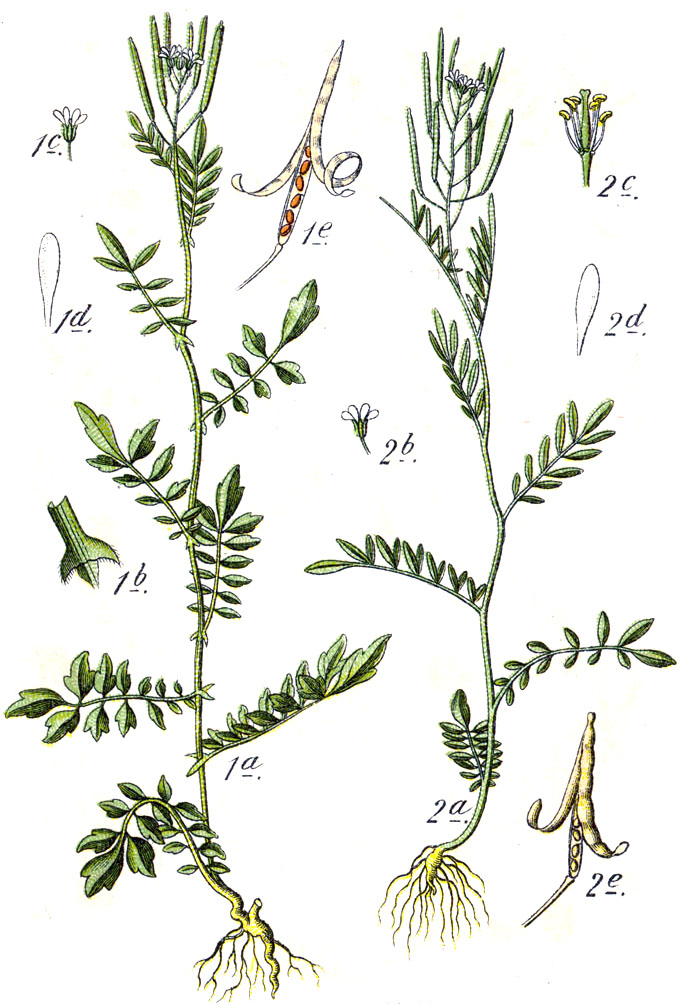

Scientific classification
- Kingdom: Plantae
- Clade: Tracheophytes
- Clade: Angiosperms
- Clade: Eudicots
- Clade: Rosids
- Order: Brassicales
- Family: Brassicaceae
- Genus: Cardamine
- Species: C. parviflora

Binomial name
- Cardamine parviflora L.

= Cardamine parviflora =

Species of flowering plant

Cardamine parviflora, commonly known as small-flowered bittercress or sand bittercress, is a species of flowering plant belonging to the family Brassicaceae.

Its native range is temperate Eurasia, subarctic America to Northern, Central, and Eastern United States.
