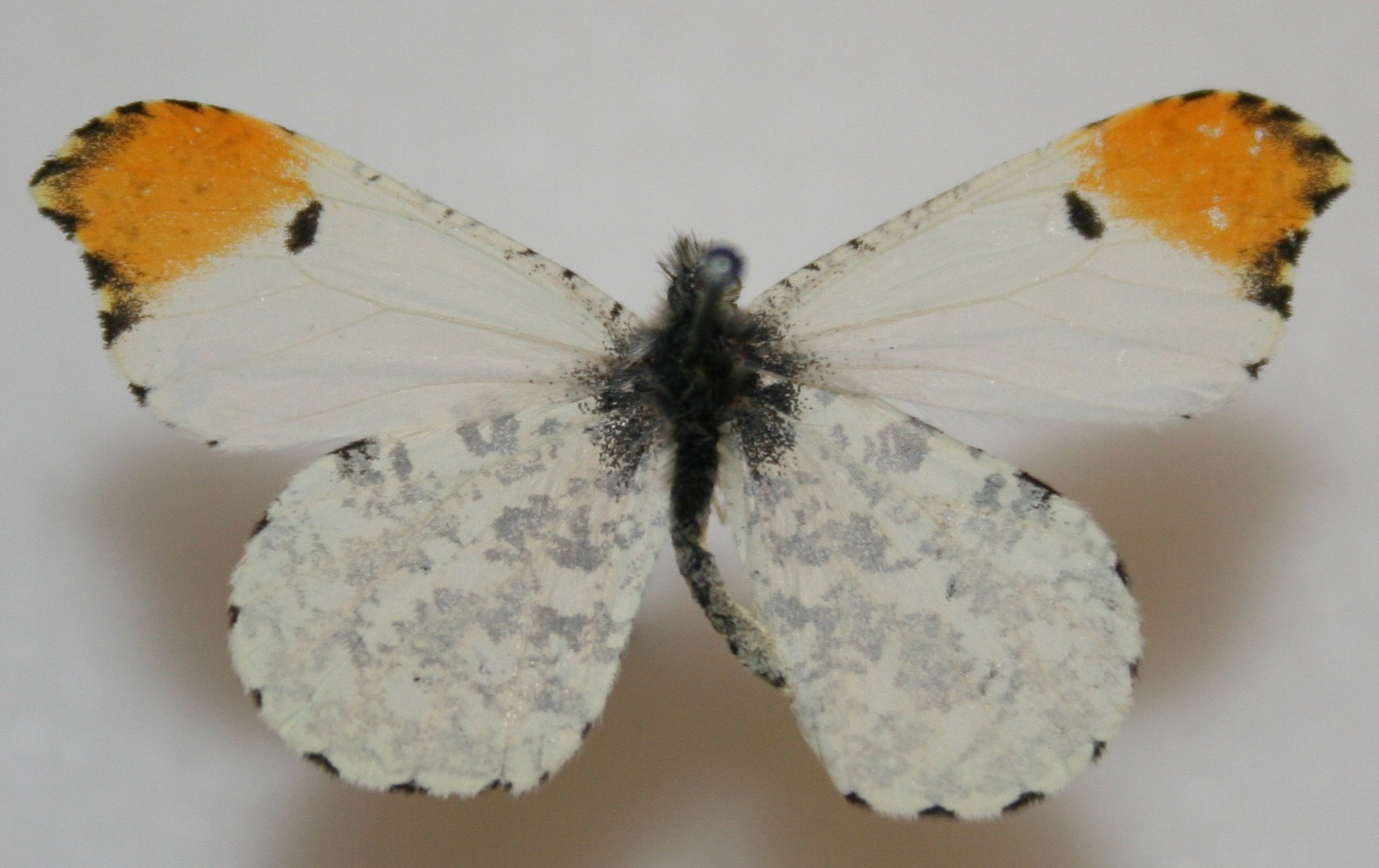
- Male (above) and female (below)
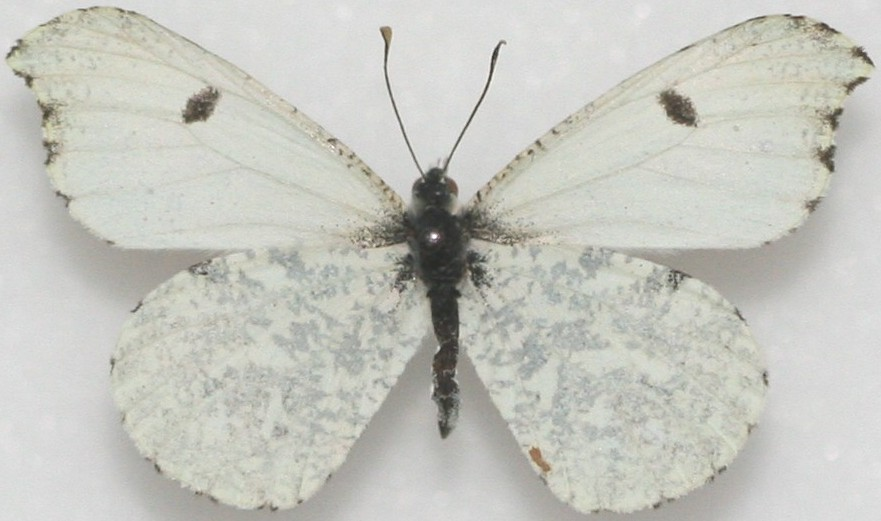

Conservation status
- Apparently Secure (NatureServe)

Scientific classification
- Kingdom: Animalia
- Phylum: Arthropoda
- Clade: Pancrustacea
- Class: Insecta
- Order: Lepidoptera
- Family: Pieridae
- Genus: Anthocharis
- Species: A. midea

Binomial name
- Anthocharis midea (Hübner, 1809)
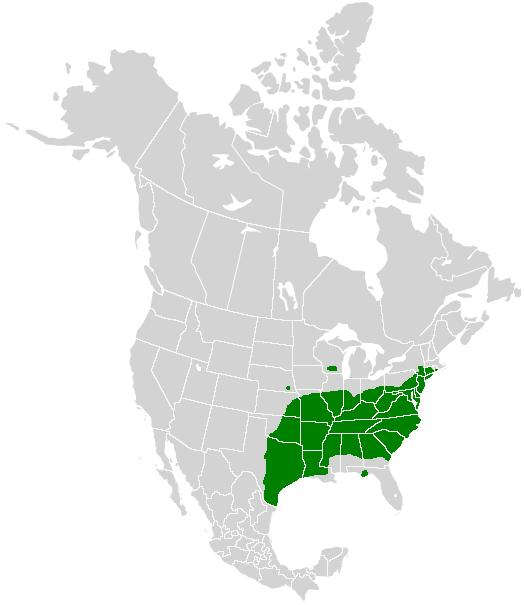

= Anthocharis midea =

Falcate orangetip

Species of butterfly in the family Pieridae

Anthocharis midea, the falcate orangetip, is a North American butterfly that was described in 1809 by Jacob Hübner. It belongs to the family Pieridae, which is the white and sulphurs. These butterflies are mostly seen in the eastern United States, and in Texas and Oklahoma. They eat the nectar of violets and mustards. They tend to live in open, wet woods along waterways, in open swamps, and less often in dry woods and ridgetops. This species is a true springtime butterfly, being on the wing from April to May (March to May in southern Texas).

== Description ==
The tip of the upper side of the male's forewing is orange; females, however, lack this. Both have a round black spot located in the cell. The underside of the hindwing usually has intricate green marbling. The orangetips have a wingspan of around 3.5-4.5 centimeters.

== Similar species ==
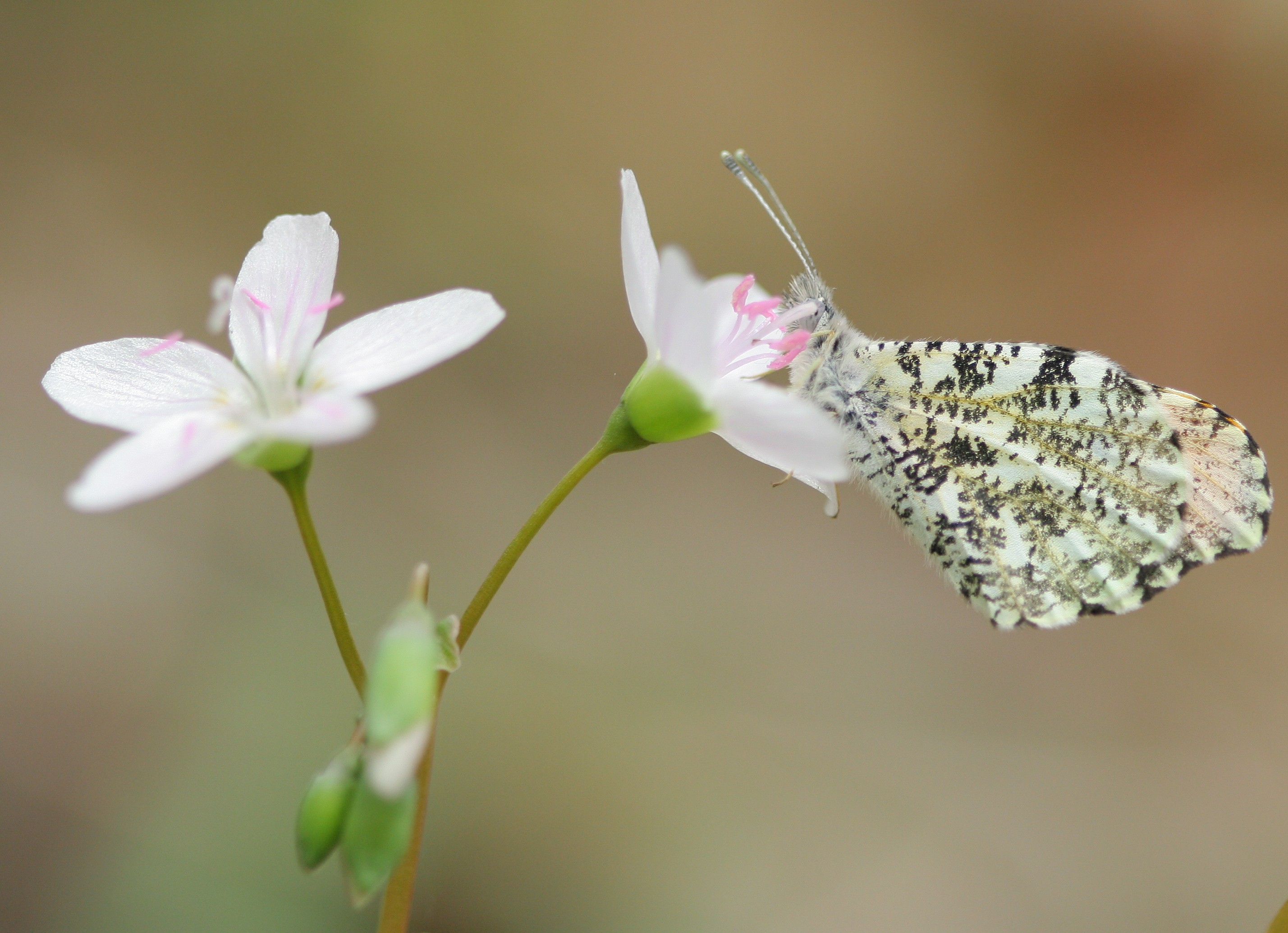
Underside of the wings

The only similar species in the falcate orangetip's range is the Olympia marble (Euchloe olympia). The upper side of the Olympia marble's forewing has a grayish-black apex and the underside of the hindwing has yellow-green marbling.

== Life cycle ==
Males patrol hilltops and flats all day seeking females. Females lay their eggs singly on host plant flowers. The eggs are yellow green but turn red just before hatching. The larvae feed mainly at night and prefer to eat flowers, flower buds, and seed pods rather than leaves. They are also cannibalistic, devouring smaller larvae that may be feeding on the same plant. The larva is olive green with a yellow mid-dorsal stripe. There is a white spiracular stripe that runs the length of the body. The body has short hairs and is covered with tiny black dots. It can grow up to 3 centimeters long. The larvae pupate in mid-June. The chrysalis is a yellowish color and is covered with black spots. It also has a spike-like projection on the head which makes it look somewhat like a thorn. The chrysalis may overwinter for two or more years. This species has one brood per year.

== Host plants ==
Host plants used by the falcate orangetip:

- Arabis glabra
- Arabidopsis lyrata
- Arabis serotina
- Barbarea verna
- Boechera canadensis
- Boechera grahamii
- Boechera laevigata
- Cardamine angustata
- Cardamine bulbosa
- Cardamine concatenata
- Cardamine diphylla
- Cardamine hirsuta
- Cardamine parviflora
- Lepidium densiflorum
