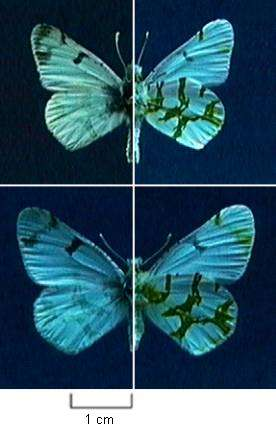

Conservation status
- Secure (NatureServe)

Scientific classification
- Kingdom: Animalia
- Phylum: Arthropoda
- Clade: Pancrustacea
- Class: Insecta
- Order: Lepidoptera
- Family: Pieridae
- Genus: Euchloe
- Species: E. olympia

Binomial name
- Euchloe olympia (W.H. Edwards, 1871)

Subspecies
- Euchloe olympia rosa (W.H. Edwards 1872)

= Euchloe olympia =

Species of butterfly

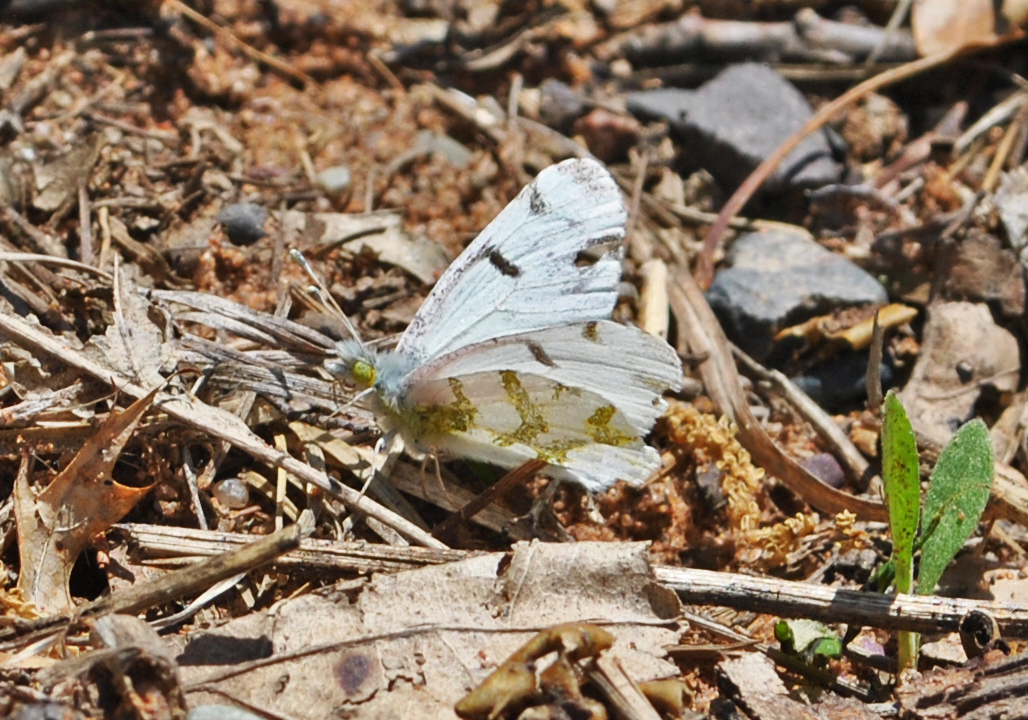
Olympia marble

Euchloe olympia, the Olympia marble, is a butterfly in the family Pieridae. Its range is southern Canada and the Midwest, down into the southwestern United States. It has one flight, and males patrol on hilltops for females. E. olympia is closely related to other Nearctic Euchloe spp., including E. guaymasensis.

== Host plants ==
Larvae feed on plants in the Brassicaceae family, including:

- Arabis lyrata
- Arabis serotina
- Arabis laevigata
- Arabis missouriensis
- Arabis drummondii
- Arabis viridis
- Arabis glabra
- Descurainia pinnata
- Sisymbrium officinale

Eggs are laid singly on flower buds. Early instars eat flowers and fruits while later instars eat leaves.

== Nectar source ==
Euchloe olympia has been observed to use Lepidium virginicum as its main nectar source as a larval and as an adult the main nectar source was found to be Nuttallanthus canadensis. Based on a study done in a central Illinois sand prairie, Echloe olympia was observed to show consistency on the flowers it visits to obtain its nectar from.

== Habitat ==
Habitat usually consists of dry clearings, prairie, and foot chaparral.

== Conservation status ==
The Olympia marble has been classified globally as G5/G4, meaning that globally it is a relatively stable species. The United States has not placed it under any watch as a country. However, gypsy moth chemical control and habitat destruction may be contributing to declines in this species. A study on the status of butterflies in the United States found that the Olympia marble has declined by 75% from 2000–2020 in the areas surveyed.
