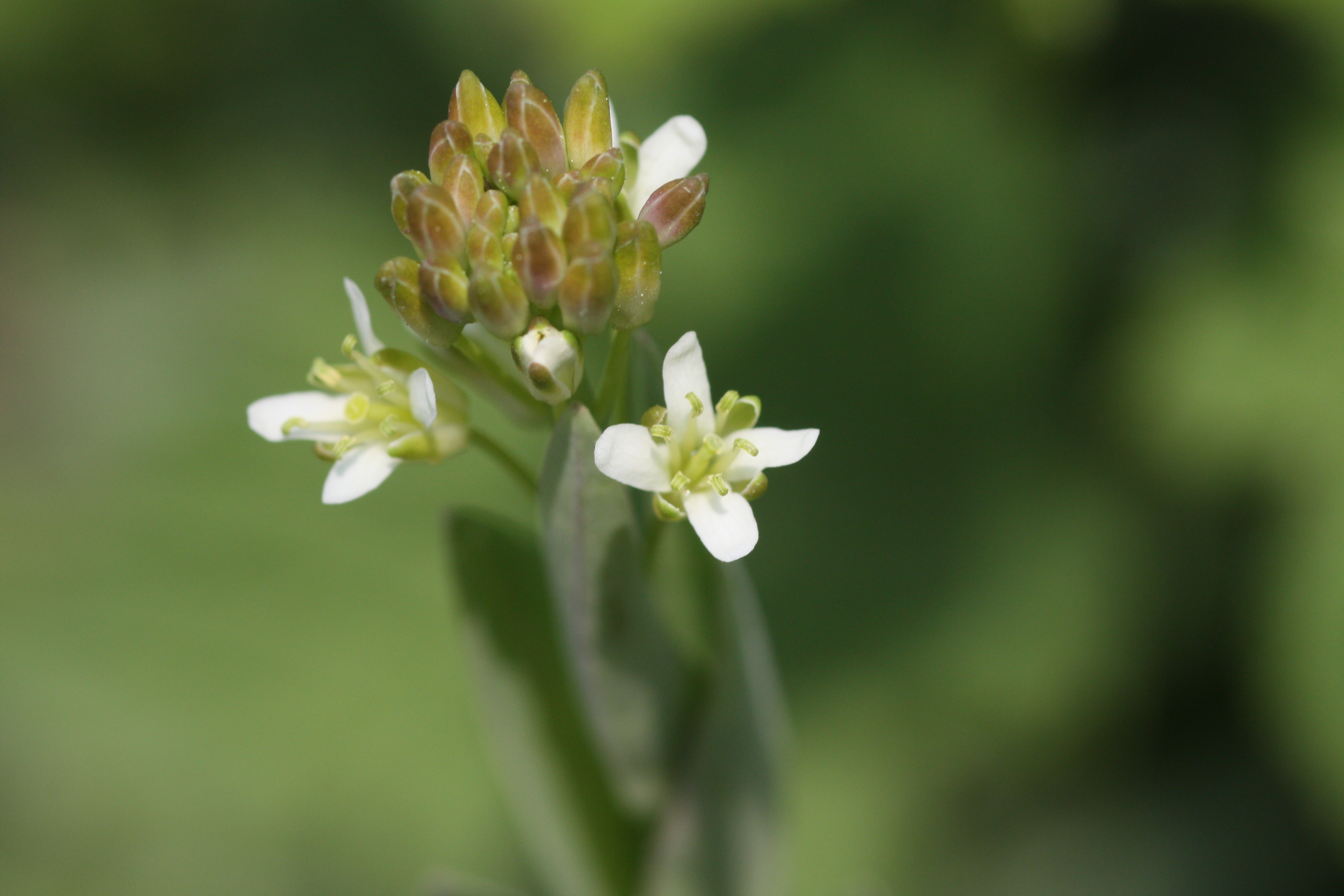

Scientific classification
- Kingdom: Plantae
- Clade: Embryophytes
- Clade: Tracheophytes
- Clade: Angiosperms
- Clade: Eudicots
- Clade: Rosids
- Order: Brassicales
- Family: Brassicaceae
- Genus: Turritis; L.

Species
- Turritis glabra L.; Turritis laxa (Sm.) Hayek

= Turritis =

Genus of flowering plants

Turritis (commonly known as towercress or tower mustard) is a plant genus in the family Brassicaceae. It contains the following two species:

- Turritis glabra L. (tower rockcress)
- Turritis laxa (Sm.) Hayek

Various other species have formerly been included in Turritis. The following list of synonyms is from BrassiBase version 1.3:

- Turritis alpina L. → Arabis ciliata
- Turritis auriculata (Lam.) Fourr. → Arabis auriculata
- Turritis brachycarpa Torr. & A. Gray → Boechera grahamii
- Turritis brassica Leers → Fourraea alpina
- Turritis caerulea (All.) All. → Arabis caerulea
- Turritis chilensis Phil. ex Reiche → Rorippa coxii
- Turritis ciliata Reynier → Arabis ciliata
- Turritis dregeana Sond. → Turritis glabra
- Turritis drummondii (A. Gray) Lunell → Boechera angustifolia
- Turritis falcata Turcz. → Boechera falcata
- Turritis gerardii Besser → Arabis nemorensis
- Turritis grahamii Lehmann → Boechera grahamii
- Turritis hirsuta L. → Arabis hirsuta
- Turritis hispidula DC. → Exhalimolobos hispidulus
- Turritis laevigata Muhl. ex Willd. → Borodinia laevigata
- Turritis lasiophylla Hook. & Arn. → Streptanthus lasiophyllus
- Turritis loeselii (L.) W.T. Aiton → Sisymbrium loeselii
- Turritis macrocarpa Nutt. → Turritis glabra
- Turritis mollis Hook. → Crucihimalaya bursifolia
- Turritis nemorensis Wolf ex Hoffm. → Arabis nemorensis
- Turritis nova (Vill.) Chaix → Arabis nova subsp. nova
- Turritis ochroleuca Lam. → Pseudoturritis turrita
- Turritis patula Ehrh. → Arabis auriculata
- Turritis patula Graham → Boechera grahamii
- Turritis pauciflora Grimm → Fourraea alpina
- Turritis planisiliqua Pers. → Arabis planisiliqua
- Turritis praecox Sm. → Arabis planisiliqua
- Turritis pseudoturritis (Boiss. & Heldr.) Velen. → Turritis glabra
- Turritis pubescens Desf. → Arabis pubescens subsp. pubescens
- Turritis purpurea Lam. → Arabis verna
- Turritis retrofracta (Graham) Hook. → Boechera retrofracta
- Turritis sagittata Bertol. → Arabis sagittata
- Turritis salsuginea (Pall.) DC. → Eutrema salsugineum
- Turritis setosa Lapeyr. → Coincya monensis subsp. cheiranthos
- Turritis spathulata Nutt. → Arabis eschscholtziana
- Turritis stricta All. → Arabis allionii
- Turritis stricta Graham → Boechera angustifolia
- Turritis stricta Host → Turritis glabra
