= Shale barrens =

Shale barrens are ecosystems of the central Appalachian Mountains. High sunlight and thin soil formed from the weathering of shale layers lead to locally high temperatures and sparse plant growth, including several endemic or near-endemic taxa.

== Physical setting ==
Shale barrens occur in the Ridge-and-Valley Appalachians from West Virginia and Virginia north through Maryland to Pennsylvania, typically where creeks undercut steep slopes (greater than 20%) of easily-weathered shale protected by caps of more resistant sandstone above. The topographic setting is more important than the age or precise composition of the shale. The barrens are principally associated with the Devonian Millboro Shale, the Romney Formation (now Marcellus Shale), the Brallier Formation, and the Trimmers Rock Formation. However, similar barrens have also been found on calcareous shales of the Ordovician Martinsburg Formation and on the Silurian Rose Hill Shale. Floristically similar barrens occur in the Blue Ridge Mountains over the metamorphic Harpers Formation, of Cambrian age.

Soils are acid (pH 4.0 to 5.0) and thin, with minimal organic matter and many fragments of shale. They are typically west- or south-facing. This orientation and the sparse tree canopy result in high levels of sunlight, which heats the underlying soil and rock. The resulting microclimate has temperatures comparable to desert regions. However, water readily percolates into the fractured rock and lower layers of soil, so drought stress (rather than high solar irradiation and temperature) does not seem to be a major factor in shaping the community.

== Vegetation ==
The conifers Virginia pine and eastern red-cedar and two oaks (chestnut oak and northern red oak) are the dominant trees, but canopy cover is very sparse. The shrubby bear oak is also present.

Eight taxa have been identified as endemic to the shale barrens: Eriogonum allenii, Clematis albicoma, Clematis coactilis, Clematis viticaulis, Borodinia serotina, Trifolium virginicum, Oenothera argillicola, and Packera antennariifolia. Others are less strongly endemic but occur on other rocky substrates with similar conditions. The shale barrens also support disjunct populations of certain taxa, such as Myriopteris rufa, Asplenium septentrionale, Astragalus distortus var. distortus, and Scutellaria ovata var. rugosa.

== Animals ==
Two rare butterflies, the Appalachian grizzled skipper and the Olympia marblewing, are now principally associated with shale barrens.

== Notes and references ==
=== Works cited ===
- Braunschweig, Suzanne H.; Nilsen, Erik T.; Wieboldt, Thomas F. (1999). "The mid-Appalachian shale barrens". In Anderson, Roger C.; Fralish, James S.; Baskin, Jerry M. (eds.). Savannas, Barrens and Rock Outcrop Communities of North America. Cambridge: Cambridge University Press. pp. 83–98. ISBN 052157322X.
