= Landcress =

Landcress may refer to several different plants in the mustard family (Brassicaceae):

- Cardamine hirsuta, a species of bittercress
- Various species of Barbarea, also known as wintercress
