= Borodinia =

Borodinia may refer to:

- Borodinia (plant), a genus of flowering plants in the family Brassicaceae
- Borodinia (protist), a genus of foraminifers in the family Acervulinidae
