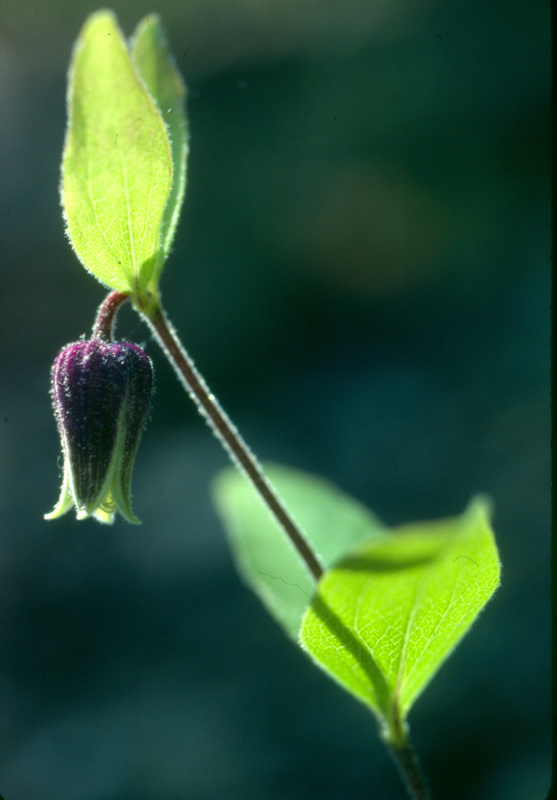

Conservation status
- Critically Imperiled (NatureServe)

Scientific classification
- Kingdom: Plantae
- Clade: Embryophytes
- Clade: Tracheophytes
- Clade: Spermatophytes
- Clade: Angiosperms
- Clade: Eudicots
- Order: Ranunculales
- Family: Ranunculaceae
- Genus: Clematis
- Species: C. viticaulis

Binomial name
- Clematis viticaulis Steele

= Clematis viticaulis =

Species of flowering plant in the buttercup family

Clematis viticaulis is a species of perennial flowering plant in the buttercup family, known by the common names Millboro leatherflower and grape clematis.

== Distribution and habitat ==
It is endemic to the Appalachian Mountains in western Virginia, in the Eastern United States. It is known from Bath, Augusta, and Rockbridge Counties.

This plant is limited to the shale barrens habitat and woodlands along its edges. There are 18 to 20 occurrences, with a total global population of 1500 to 2500 individuals. Despite its rarity and endangered species status, the plant's population is generally stable, with only minor threats, such as herbivory and road maintenance. Recruitment from seed is uncommon but the plants live a long time once established.

== Description ==
Clematis viticaulis is a woody vine, producing erect, hairy stems up to 0.5 metres (1.6 ft) long. The thin, leathery oval leaves are up to 8 centimeters long by 4.5 wide and are oppositely arranged on the stems.

The inflorescence is a single urn-shaped flower. There are no petals, just hairy purple or blue- or green-tinged sepals which are lance-shaped and up to 2.5 centimeters long. The sepal tips are pointed or rounded and spread, curve, or curl backward.

The fruit is an achene with a plumelike, copper-colored extension up to 4 centimeters long. These seedheads replace the faded flowers and remain throughout July, when the plants may go semi-dormant.

== See also ==
- Flora of the Appalachian Mountains
