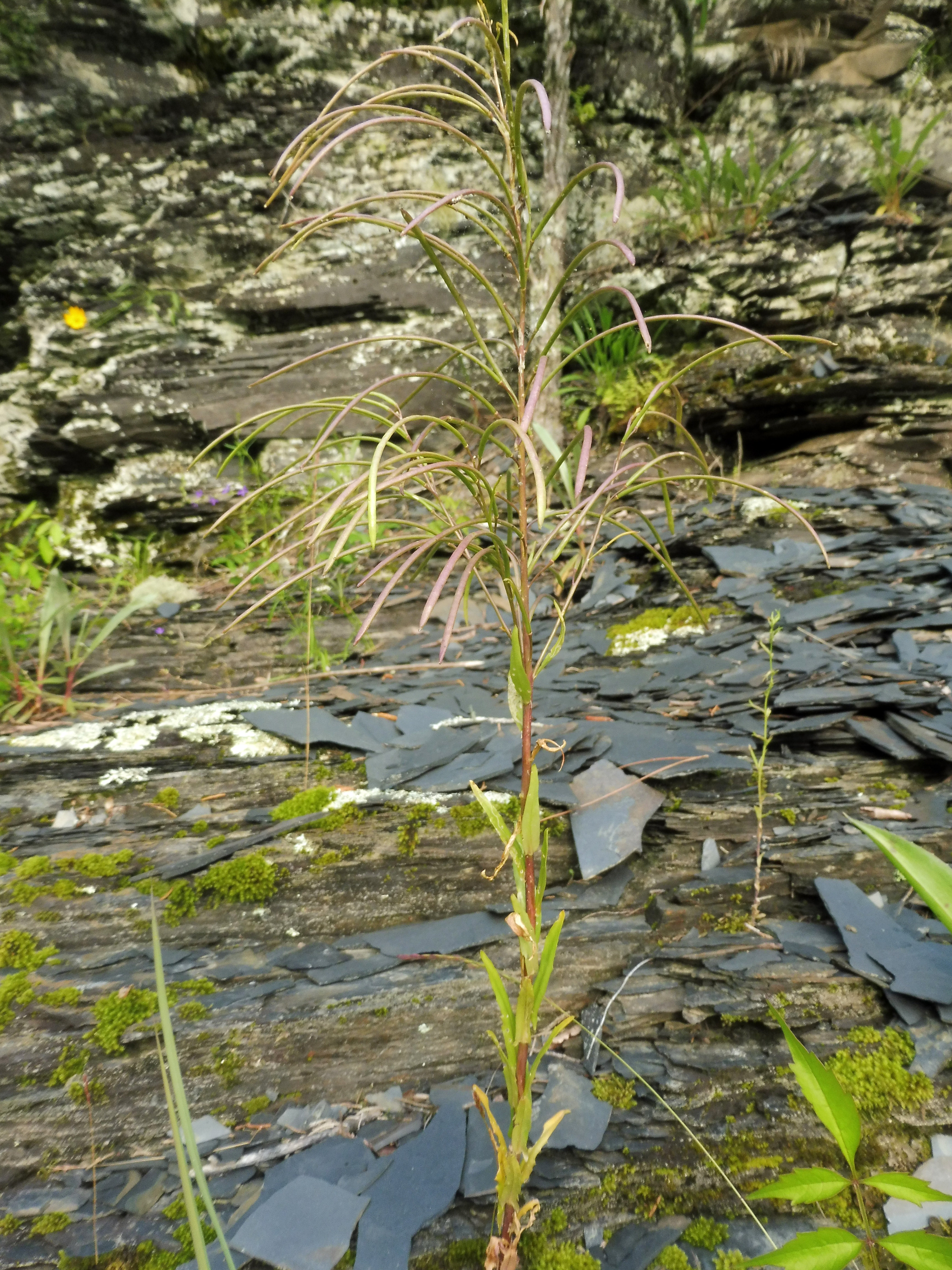

Scientific classification
- Kingdom: Plantae
- Clade: Tracheophytes
- Clade: Angiosperms
- Clade: Eudicots
- Clade: Rosids
- Order: Brassicales
- Family: Brassicaceae
- Genus: Borodinia
- Species: B. missouriensis

Binomial name
- Borodinia missouriensis (Greene) Al-Shehbaz

Synonyms
- List: Arabis laevigata var. missouriensis (Greene) H.E.Ahles; Arabis missouriensis Greene; Boechera missouriensis (Greene) Al-Shehbaz; Arabis missouriensis var. deamii (M.Hopkins) M.Hopkins; Arabis viridis Harger

= Borodinia missouriensis =

Species of flowering plant

Borodinia missouriensis, commonly called Missouri rockcress, is a species of flowering plant in the mustard family (Brassicaceae). It is native to the eastern United States, where it has a highly fragmented range localized in the Northeast, the Upper Midwest, the Interior Highlands, and the Southeast. Its natural habitat is typically on rocky or sandy woodlands and bluffs, in areas of acidic soil. It is generally uncommon throughout most of its range, with exception for the Interior Highlands region.

Borodinia missouriensis is an erect biennial. It produces racemes of small creamy-white flowers in the spring. It bears a resemblance to more widespread Borodinia laevigata, from which it can be distinguished by the following characters: Stem leaves dense, erect, and overlapping, basal leaves persistent and pinnately lobed, petals about twice as long as sepals, and stems often red-tinged.
