= Northern grizzled skipper =

- Pyrgus centaureae loki, mating

Scientific classification
- Kingdom: Animalia
- Phylum: Arthropoda
- Clade: Pancrustacea
- Class: Insecta
- Order: Lepidoptera
- Family: Hesperiidae
- Genus: Pyrgus
- Species: P. centaureae

Binomial name
- Pyrgus centaureae (Rambur, 1839)

Synonyms
- Pyrgus freija Warren, 1924; Pyrgus fasciata (Warren, 1926)

Species of skipper butterfly genus Pyrgus

The northern grizzled skipper (Pyrgus centaureae) is a Holarctic species of skipper butterfly (family Hesperiidae) with a range in North America from the subarctic to the north, New Mexico to the south, and the Appalachian Mountains to the east.In the Palearctic the species which was described from Norway is distributed across Scandinavia and the northern part of European Russia across the Urals through northern Asia to the Altai.

== Description ==
While generally similar to most other Pyrgus species, this species has a greyer brown background colour with bold white spots on both the forewing and hindwing. Unlike most other Pyrgus species, the veins on the underside are obviously lined white. Wingspan is 25 to 33 mm. Seitz describes it- H. centaureae Rambur. (86 a) large, dark, with very distinct white dots and spots. Underside of hindwing dark brown or blackish with a greenish tint. The brown band which forms the outer border of the white band, bears spots and forms the inner border of a white terminal band, which appears divided by a row of strong brown dots so that there are two white bands beyond the median band. Scandinavia, Finland, the Altai; also in North America; in June and July.

== Biology ==
It occurs in the northern taiga, forest-tundra and southern shrub tundra. One generation is produced per year in its southern range from March to May. Two years are required for each brood in the subarctic. Larval food plants include cloudberry (Rubus chamaemorus), wild strawberry (Fragaria virginiana), dwarf cinquefoil (Potentilla canadensis), and varileaf cinquefoil (Potentilla diversifolia).

== Subspecies ==
- Pyrgus centaureae centaureae
- Pyrgus centaureae freija (Warren, 1924) (Canada)
- Pyrgus centaureae wyandot (Edwards, 1863)
- Pyrgus centaureae loki Evans, 1953 (Colorado)

== Etymology ==
Named in the Classical tradition a Centaur is a creature from Greek mythology with the upper body of a human and the lower body and legs of a horse.
