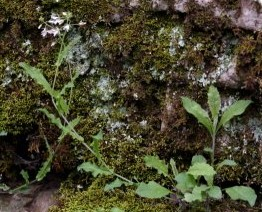

Conservation status
- Imperiled (NatureServe)

Scientific classification
- Kingdom: Plantae
- Clade: Tracheophytes
- Clade: Angiosperms
- Clade: Eudicots
- Clade: Rosids
- Order: Brassicales
- Family: Brassicaceae
- Genus: Borodinia
- Species: B. perstellata

Binomial name
- Borodinia perstellata (E.L.Braun)Al-Shehbaz

Synonyms
- Arabis perstellata E.L.Braun; Boechera perstellata (E.L.Braun) Al-Shehbaz; Arabis perstellata var. ampla Rollins

= Borodinia perstellata =

Species of flowering plant

Borodinia perstellata, commonly known as Braun's rockcress and Nevada rockcress, is a rare species of flowering plant in the mustard family. It is native to Kentucky and Tennessee, where it is known from perhaps 25 total populations. Most of the occurrences have few individuals, and all are deteriorating in quality. The plant grows in shady forest habitat on limestone substrates, usually near streams or rivers. This is a federally listed endangered species of the United States.

== Description ==
This rockcress is a perennial herb with decumbent stems reaching 80 centimeters in length. The stems spread out horizontally, and often droop over the side of any structure the plant may be growing on, such as a rock or cliffside. The leaves are arranged in a basal rosette with some alternately arranged along the stem. The stems and leaves are gray-green in color due to a coating of whitish star-shaped hairs. The inflorescence is a raceme of flowers with four white or lavender petals each a few millimeters long. The fruit is a hairy silique 1.5 to 2 centimeters in length which contains tiny reddish seeds.

== Habitat ==
Some authorities divide the species into two varieties, var. perstellata (small rockcress), which is mostly limited to Franklin County, Kentucky, in the vicinity of the Kentucky River, and var. ampla (large rockcress), which is known only from Tennessee. Other authorities do not divide the species and suggest any physical differences are caused by the local environment.

== Conservation ==
While the plant is often found in disturbed habitat such as roadcuts, excessive disturbance is a threat to its existence. Forces such as development, erosion, and logging disrupt its habitat. Other threats include competition from non-native plants, including the invasive garlic mustard (Alliaria petiolata) and amur honeysuckle (Lonicera maackii).
