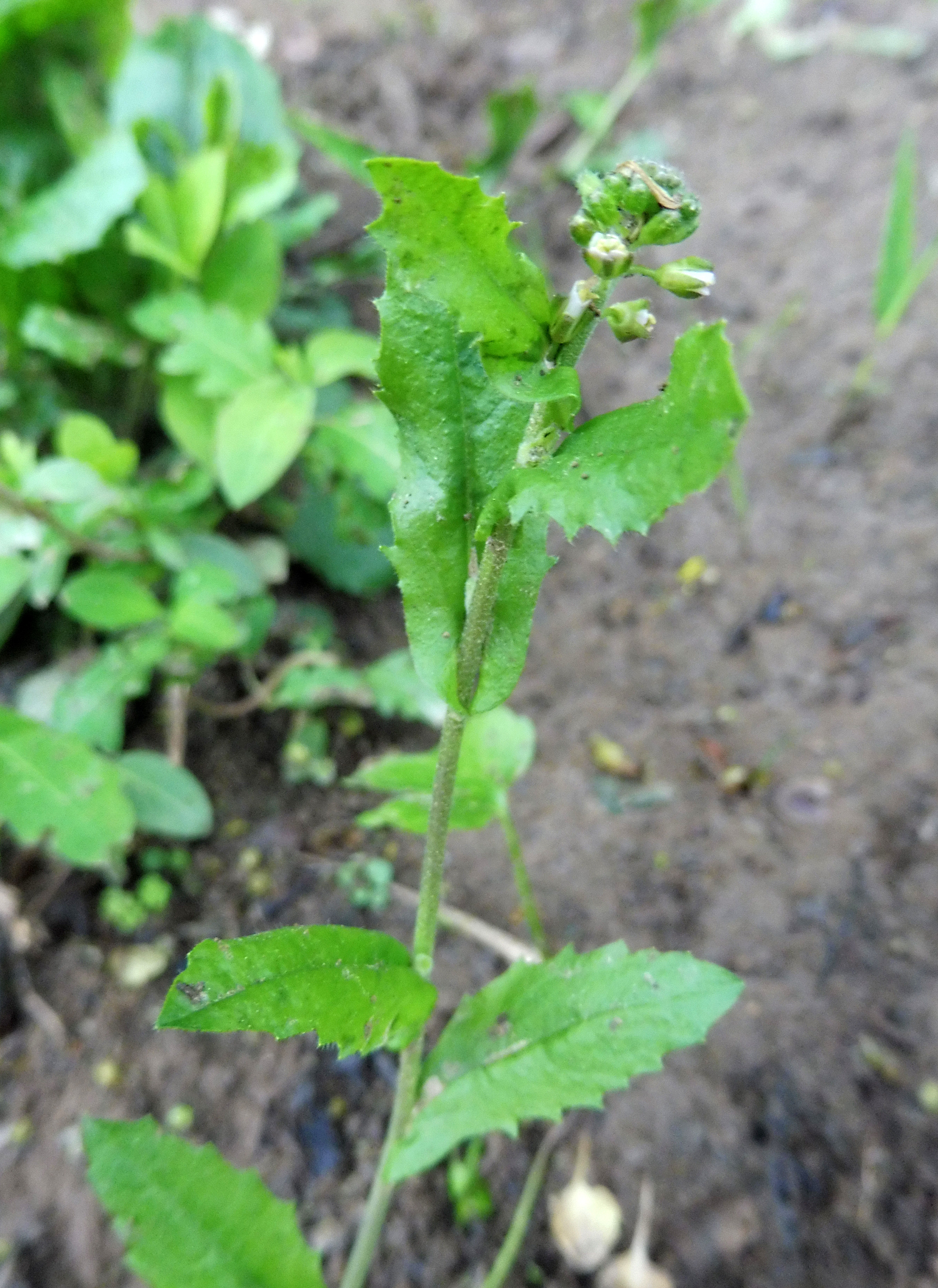

Conservation status
- Secure (NatureServe)

Scientific classification
- Kingdom: Plantae
- Clade: Tracheophytes
- Clade: Angiosperms
- Clade: Eudicots
- Clade: Rosids
- Order: Brassicales
- Family: Brassicaceae
- Genus: Borodinia
- Species: B. dentata

Binomial name
- Borodinia dentata (Raf.) P.J.Alexander & Windham

Synonyms
- List: Arabis dentata Torr. & A.Gray; Arabis perstellata var. shortii Fernald; Arabis shortii (Fernald) Gleason; Boechera dentata (Raf.) Al-Shehbaz & Zarucchi; Boechera shortii (Fernald) Al-Shehbaz; Erysimum dentatum (Raf.) Kuntze; Iodanthus dentatus (Raf.) Greene; Shortia dentata Raf.; Arabis dentata var. phalacrocarpa M.Hopkins; Arabis perstellata var. phalacrocarpa (M.Hopkins) Fernald; Arabis shortii var. phalacrocarpa (M.Hopkins) Steyerm.; Boechera dentata var. phalacrocarpa (M.Hopkins) Mohlenbr.; Sisymbrium dentatum Torr.

= Borodinia dentata =

Species of flowering plant

Borodinia dentata, commonly called Short's rockcress, is a species of flowering plant in the mustard family (Brassicaceae). It is native to the eastern North America, where it is found in Canada and the United States. In the United States, its range is primarily centered in the Midwest, and in Canada it is only known from Ontario. Its natural habitat is in nutrient-rich alluvial forests and loamy bluffs, often on calcareous substrate.

Borodinia dentata is a short-lived herbaceous biennial. It can be distinguished from other species in its area by a combination of short fruits (reaching 4.2 cm) on short pedicels (reaching 3.5 mm), which are held spreading at maturity, and its wider stem leaves (reaching > 8 mm) that have a pubescent upper surface. It produces cream-colored flowers in the spring.
