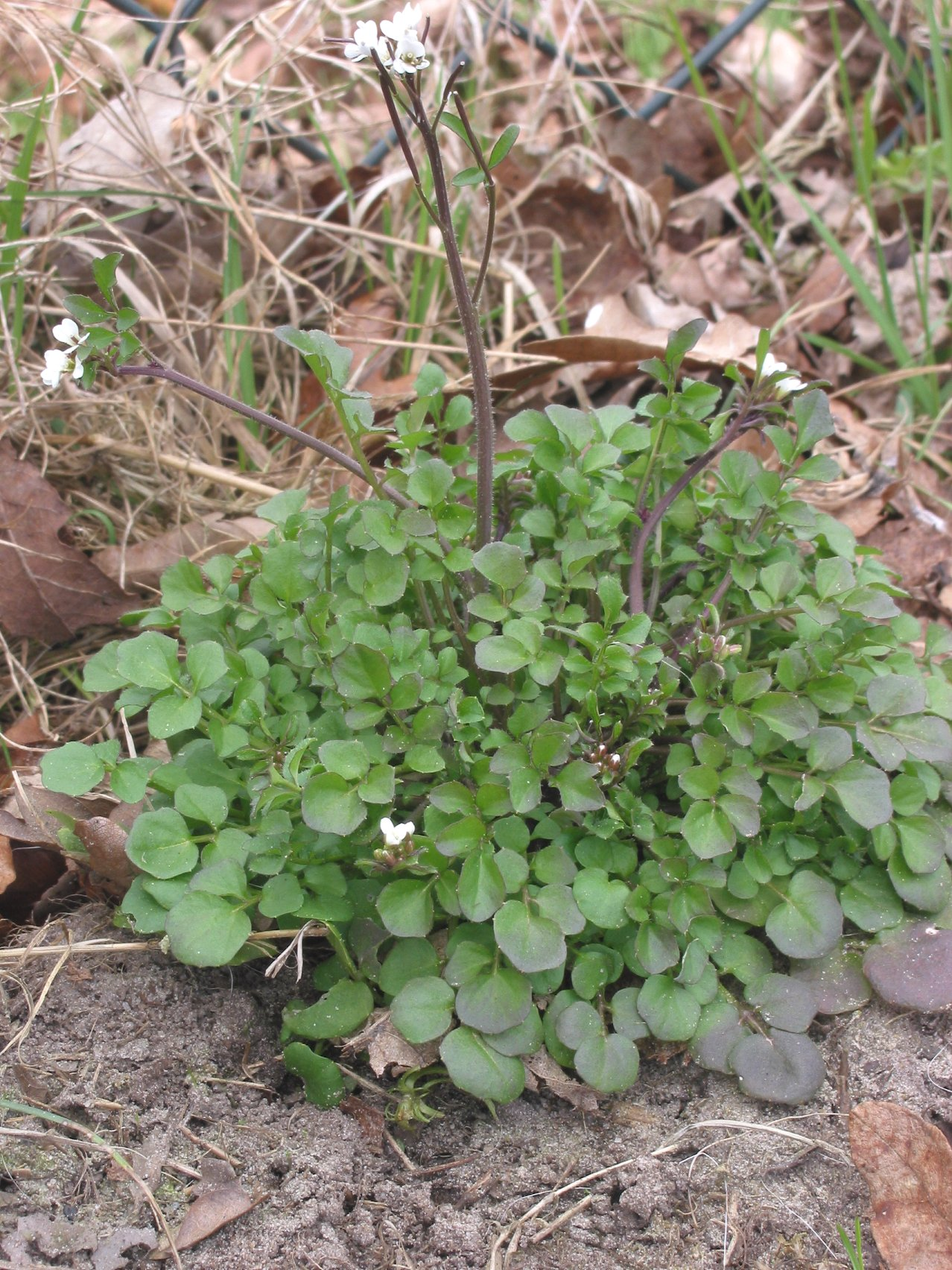

Scientific classification
- Kingdom: Plantae
- Clade: Tracheophytes
- Clade: Angiosperms
- Clade: Eudicots
- Clade: Rosids
- Order: Brassicales
- Family: Brassicaceae
- Genus: Cardamine
- Species: C. hirsuta

Binomial name
- Cardamine hirsuta L.

Synonyms
- Cardamine multicaulis Hoppe ex Schur; Cardamine scutata var. formosana (Hayata) T.S. Liu & S.S. Ying; Cardamine umbrosa Andrz. ex DC.

= Cardamine hirsuta =

Hairy bittercress

Species of flowering plant in the cabbage family

Cardamine hirsuta, commonly called hairy bittercress, popping cress, common bittercress, hoary bittercress, hairy wood-cress, small bittercress, pepperweed, shotweed, or snapweed, is an annual or biennial species of plant in the family Brassicaceae, and is edible as a salad green. It is common in moist areas around the world.

== Description ==
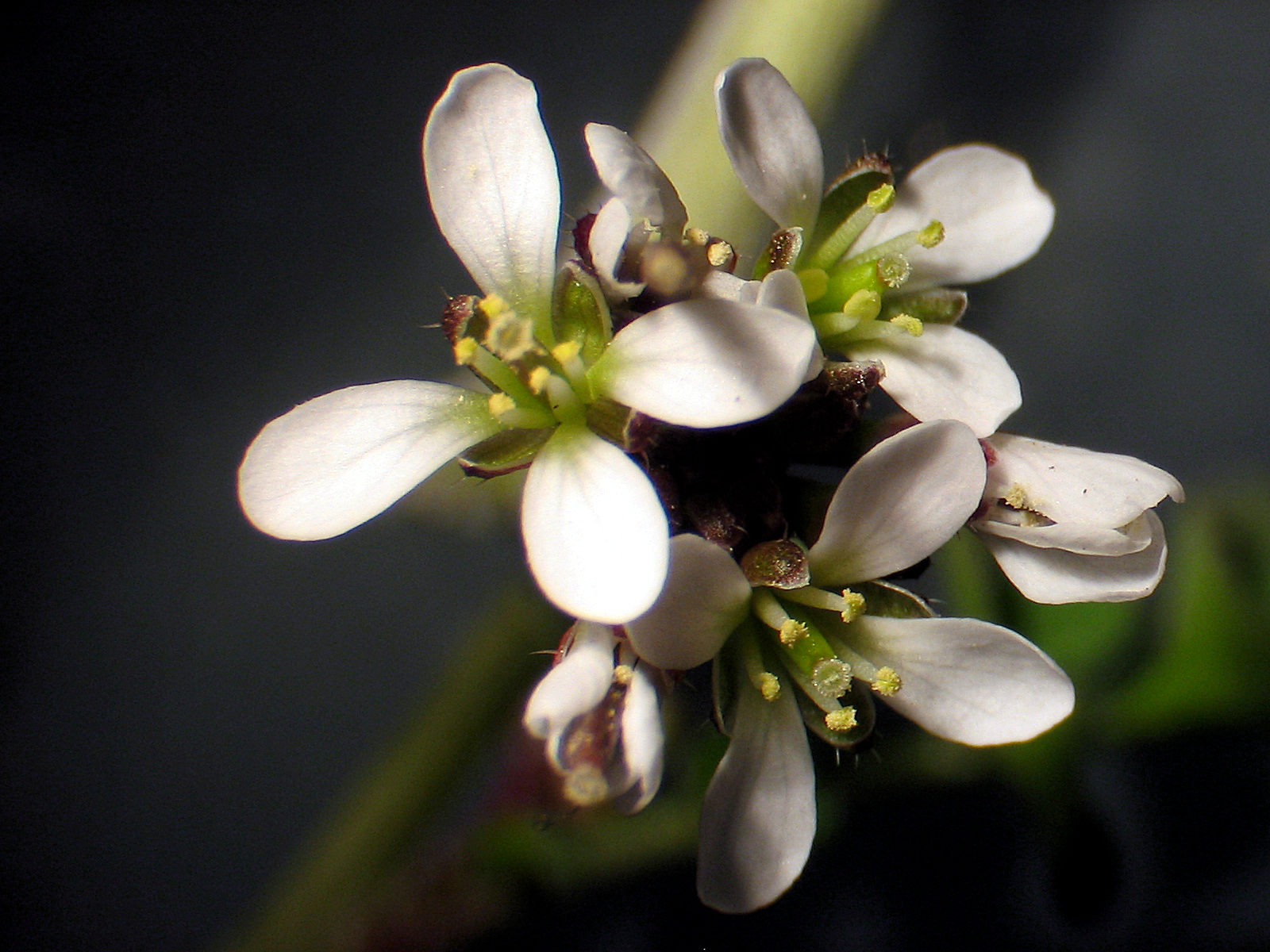
Cardamine hirsuta flowers

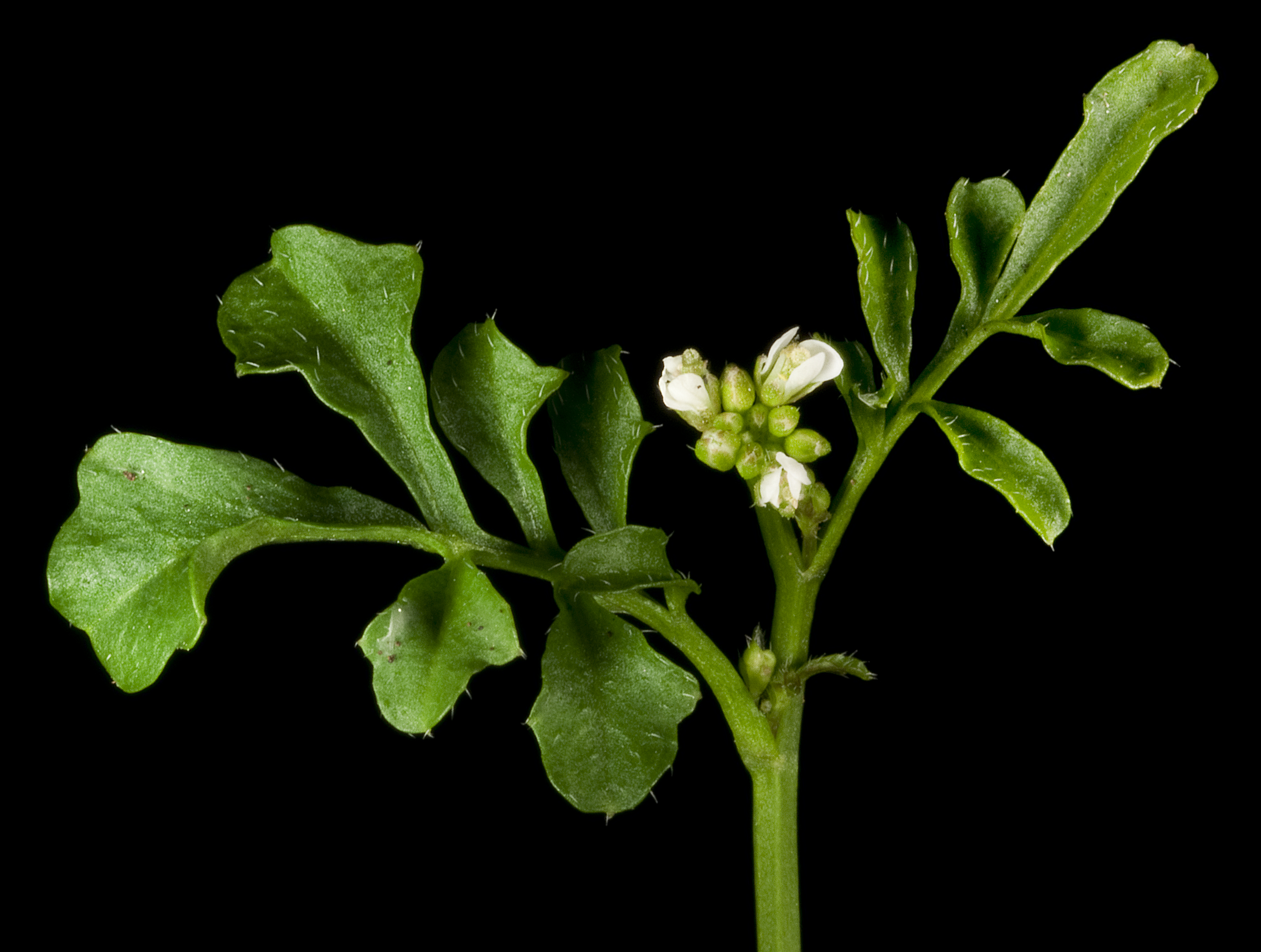
Flowers and leaves

Depending on the climate C. hirsuta may complete two generations in a year, one in the spring and one in the fall; also depending on the climate, the seeds may germinate in the fall and the plants may remain green throughout the winter before flowering in the spring. It often grows a rosette of leaves at the base of the stem, while there may be leaves on the upright stem, most of the leaves will be part of the basal rosette. The leaves in this rosette are pinnately divided into 8–15 leaflets which have short stems connecting them to the petiole. These basal leaves are often 3.5–15 cm (1.4–5.9 in) long. The leaflets are round to ovate in shape and may have smooth or dentate edges. The leaflet at the tip of the leaf (terminal leaflet) will be larger than the other leaflets and round to reniform in shape. The cauline (attached to the upright stem) leaves are also pinnately divided, with fewer leaflets, and generally smaller than the basal leaves; these leaves will be borne on a petiole and are 1.2–5.5 cm (0.5–2.2 in) long. The stems, petioles, and upper surfaces of the cauline leaves are sparsely hairy.

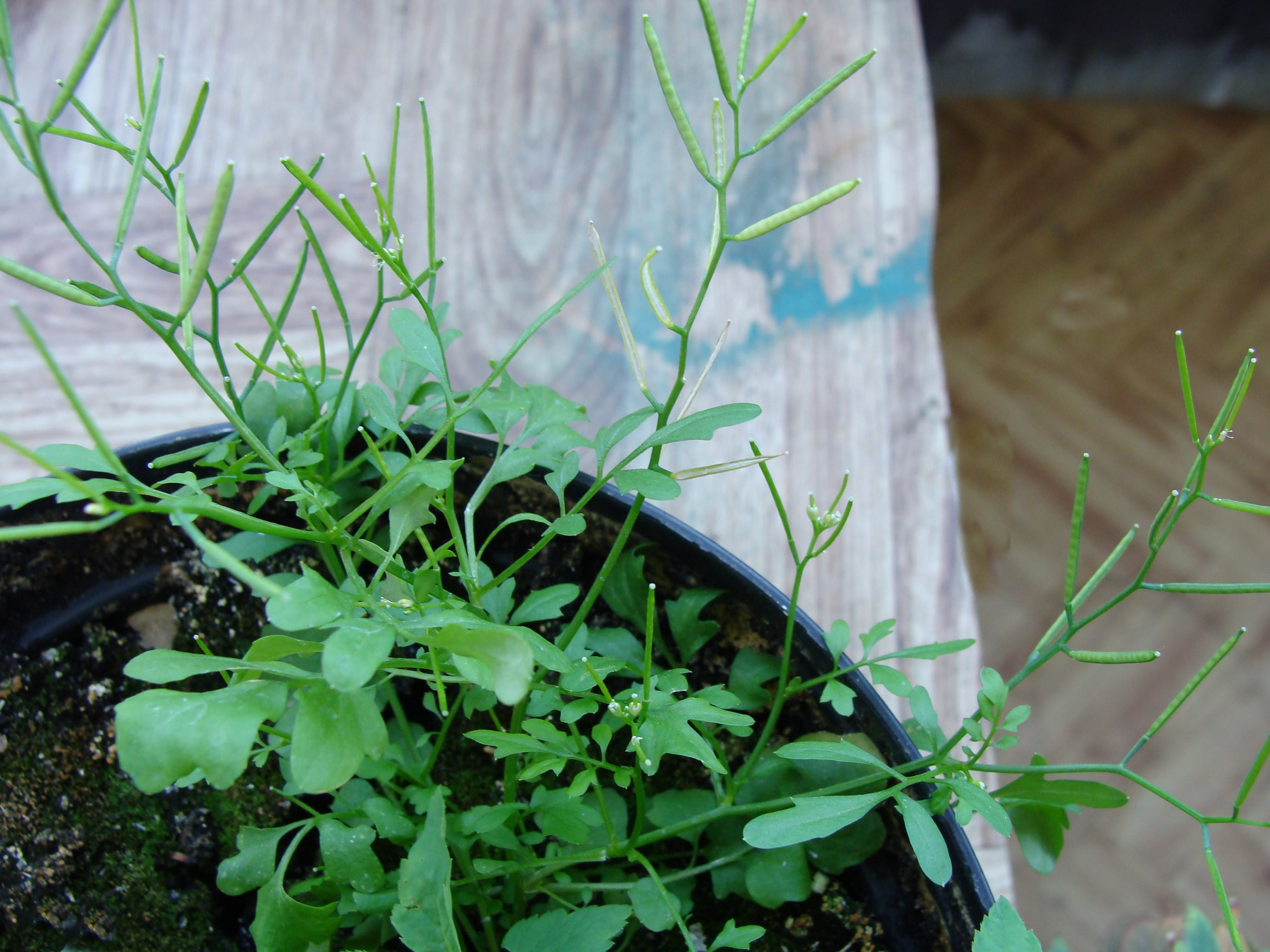
Fruits

Plants of this species are usually erect and grow to no more than about 30 centimetres (12 in) from a stem which is either unbranched or branched near the base. The small white flowers are borne in a raceme without any bracts, soon followed by the seeds and often continuing to flower as the first seeds ripen. The flowers have 4 white petals (which may be lacking but are mostly present) which are 1.5–4.5 mm long and spatulate shaped. The flowers also have 4 stamens of equal height instead of the 6 which are found in most closely related plants. Pollen grains are elongated, approximately 32 microns in length.

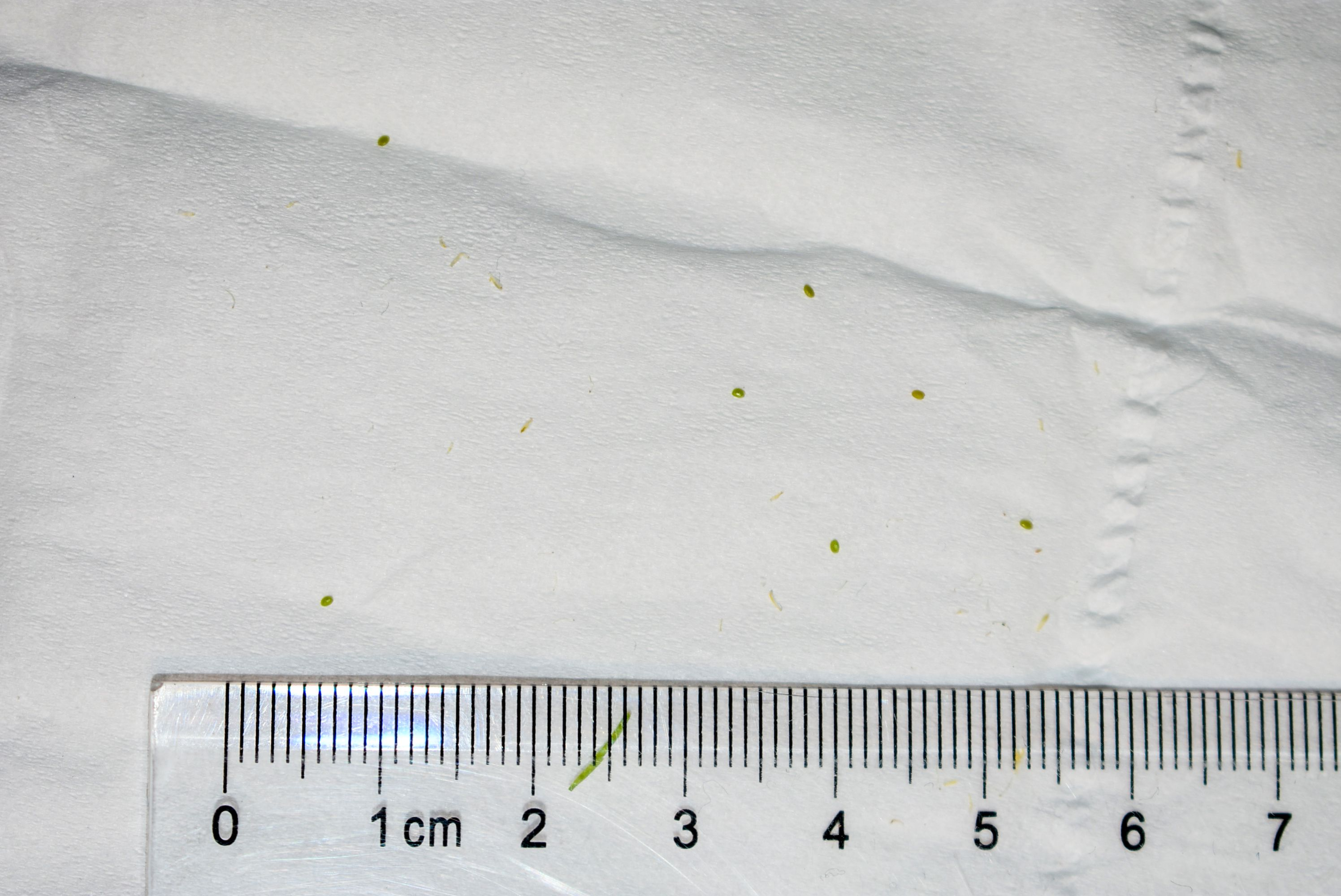
Seeds

Below the flowers there are 4 sepals which are oblong shaped and 1.5–2.5 mm long and .3–.7 mm wide. The seeds are borne in upright pointing siliquae which are straight and 1.5–2.5 cm long and 1–1.4 mm in diameter. When the fruit is ripe the valves on the siliquae will coil tightly from the bottom to the top after being touched and burst explosively, sending the seeds flying far from the parent plant. This seed dispersal strategy is referred to as ballochory and is a type of rapid plant movement.

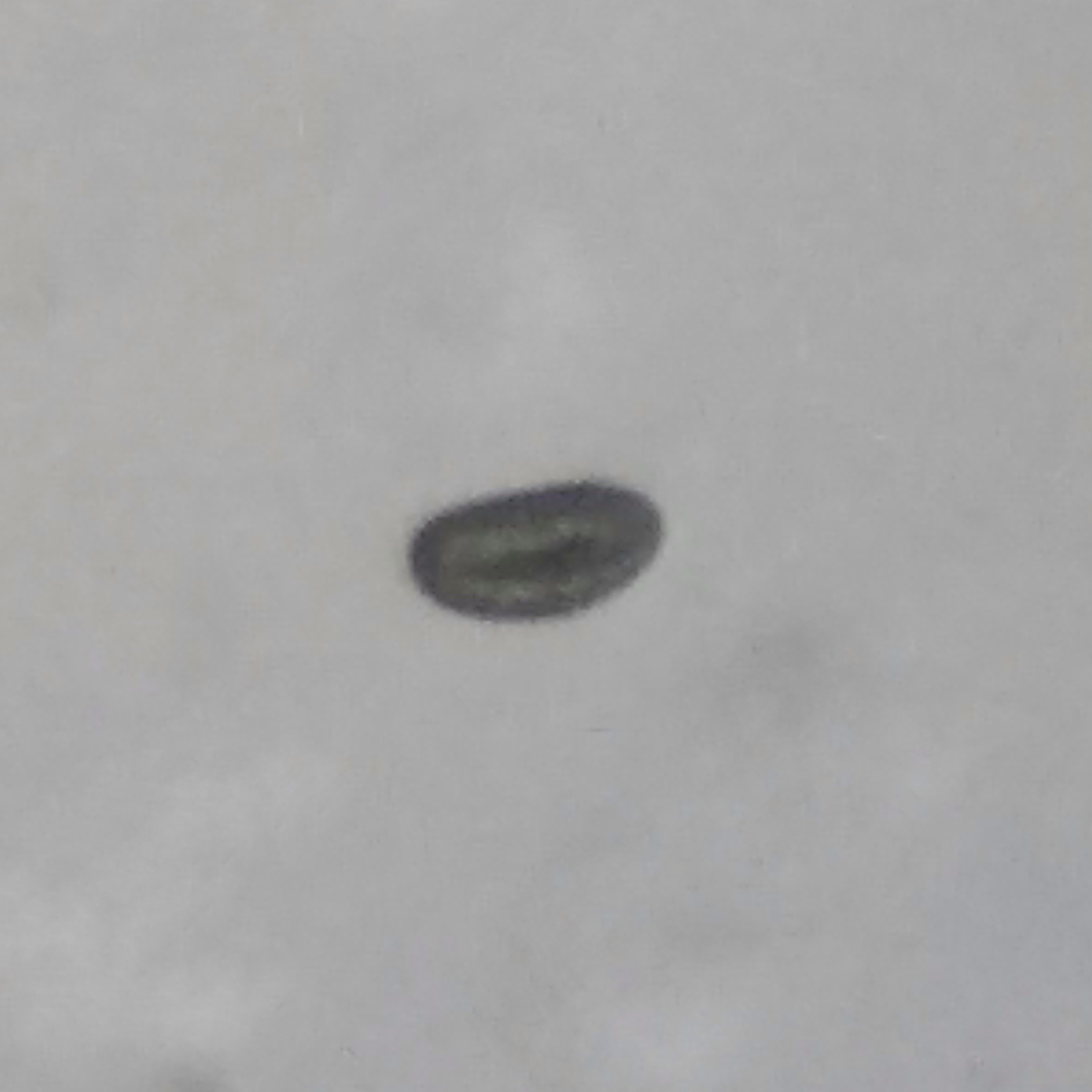
Pollen

Hairy bittercress is very similar to Cardamine flexuosa. Some differences are that C. hirsuta stems are hairless and the leaves do not clasp the stems, as in C. flexuosa. It usually has only 4 stamens, while C. flexuosa has 6 stamens, and the fruits of C. hirsuta overtop the flowers whereas in C. flexuosa the fruits do not overtop the younger flowers. The fruits grow in a thin pod arranged as a single row.

Cardamine hirsuta has a chromosome number of 2n = 16.

== Habitat and distribution ==
It is commonly found in damp, recently disturbed soil, open ground, turf and waste places and native to Europe, the Middle East, South Asia, Southeast Asia, Central Asia, North Africa, Central Africa, and the Horn of Africa.

These conditions are prevalent in nursery or garden centre plants, and hairy bittercress seeds may be introduced with those plants. Once established, it is difficult to eradicate. The tiny flowers are attractive to a few early butterflies, including (in the United States) spring azure (Celastrina ladon) and falcate orange-tip (Anthocharis midea).

Cardamine hirsuta has been introduced in many countries across the world. Its range includes but is not limited to: Argentina, Australia, Canada, China, Colombia, Costa Rica, Ecuador, Gabon, Great Britain, India, Japan, Laos, Madagascar, Mexico, Pakistan, Panama, Peru, Philippines, South Africa, Sri Lanka, Thailand, Turkmenistan, United States, Venezuela, and Vietnam.

The 1889 book The Useful Native Plants of Australia records that it was also called "Lady's Smock" and that "This and other species afford excellent pot-herbs when luxuriant and flaccid. The present one is a common weed almost throughout the world."

== Etymology and naming ==
- Binomial etymology
  - Cardamine is Dioscorides' name for cress. It is derived from Greek.
  - Hirsuta means "hairy" or "hirsute".
- Common names
  - Other common or country names include lamb's cress, land cress, hoary bitter cress, spring cress, flick weed, and shot weed, Alabama slapweed (or lambscress, landcress, hoary bittercress, springcress, flickweed, and shotweed). Some of these common names may be shared with other plants in the family Brassicaceae, and are therefore of limited usefulness. As Old English stune, the plant is cited as one of the herbs invoked in the pagan Anglo-Saxon Nine Herbs Charm, recorded in the 10th century.

== Uses ==
The leaves, flowers, and seedpods are edible raw or cooked, and are said to have a mild peppery taste. In Georgia and Eastern Europe, the leaves are used for salad, while seeds are a good substitute for mustard.
