= Eriogonum allenii =

Scientific classification
- Kingdom: Plantae
- Clade: Tracheophytes
- Clade: Angiosperms
- Clade: Eudicots
- Order: Caryophyllales
- Family: Polygonaceae
- Genus: Eriogonum
- Species: E. allenii

Binomial name
- Eriogonum allenii S.Watson

Species of flowering plant

Eriogonum allenii is a North American species of flowering plants in the family Polygonaceae known by the common names shale barren wild buckwheat or yellow buckwheat. It grows on Devonian shale in the eastern United States. It is found in the central Appalachian Mountains of West Virginia and Virginia.

Eriogonum allenii grows up to 50 cm (19.5 in) tall. The leaves are tomentose to floccose, oblong to ovate, 10–15 cm (4–6 in) long. The flowers are yellow and are 3–7 mm (0–0.5 in) in diameter.

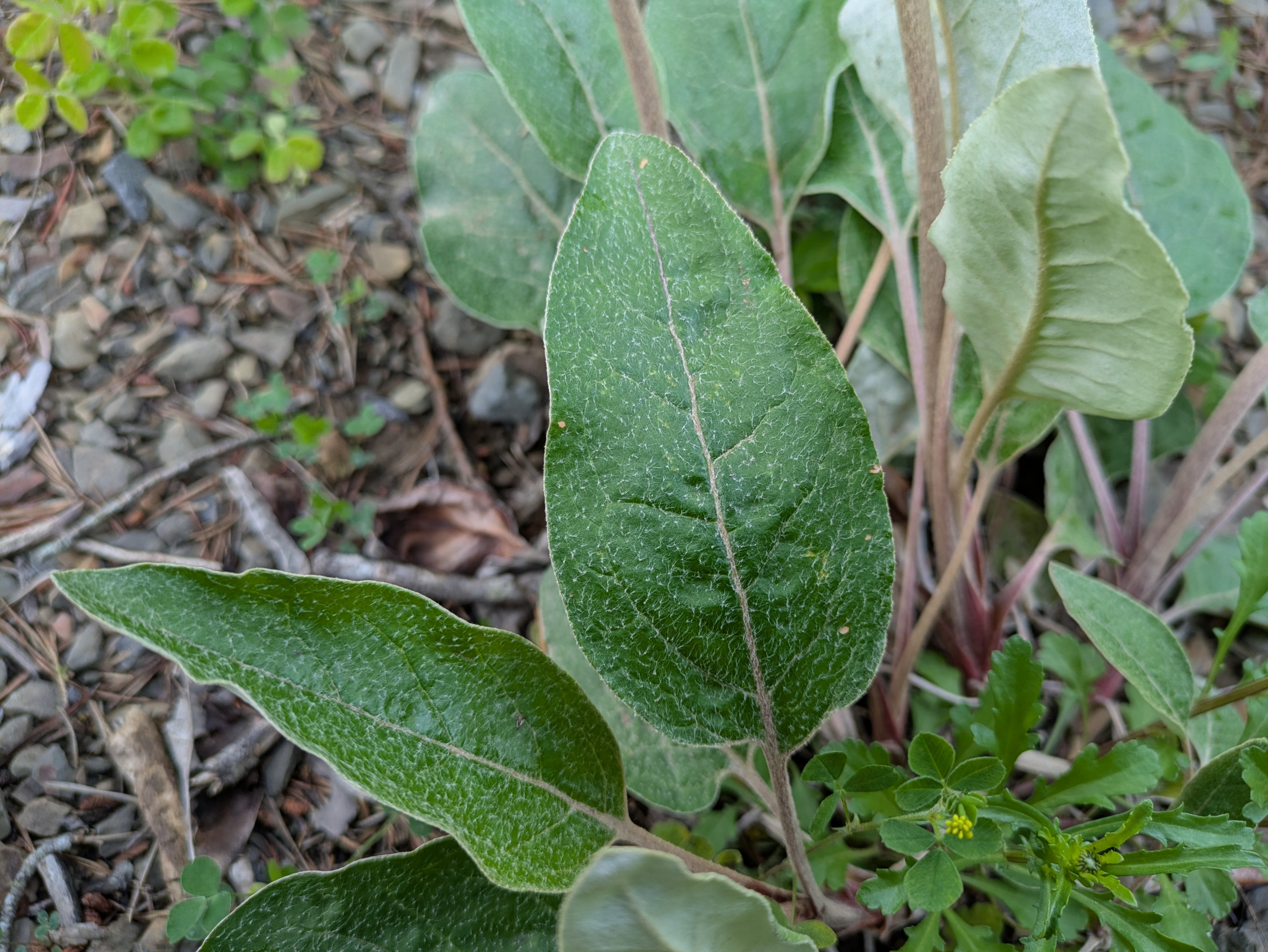
Upper leaf surface

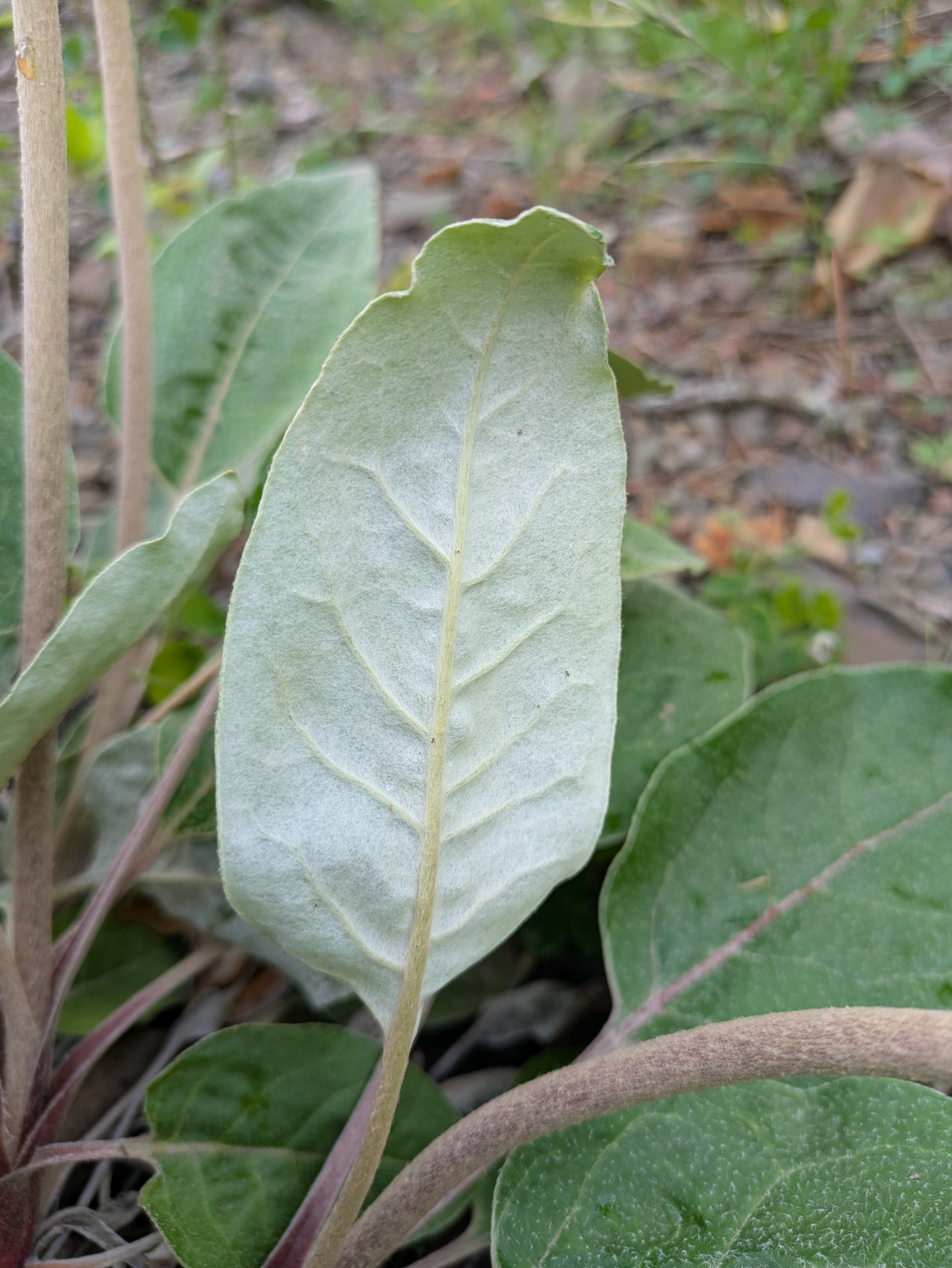
Underside leaf surface

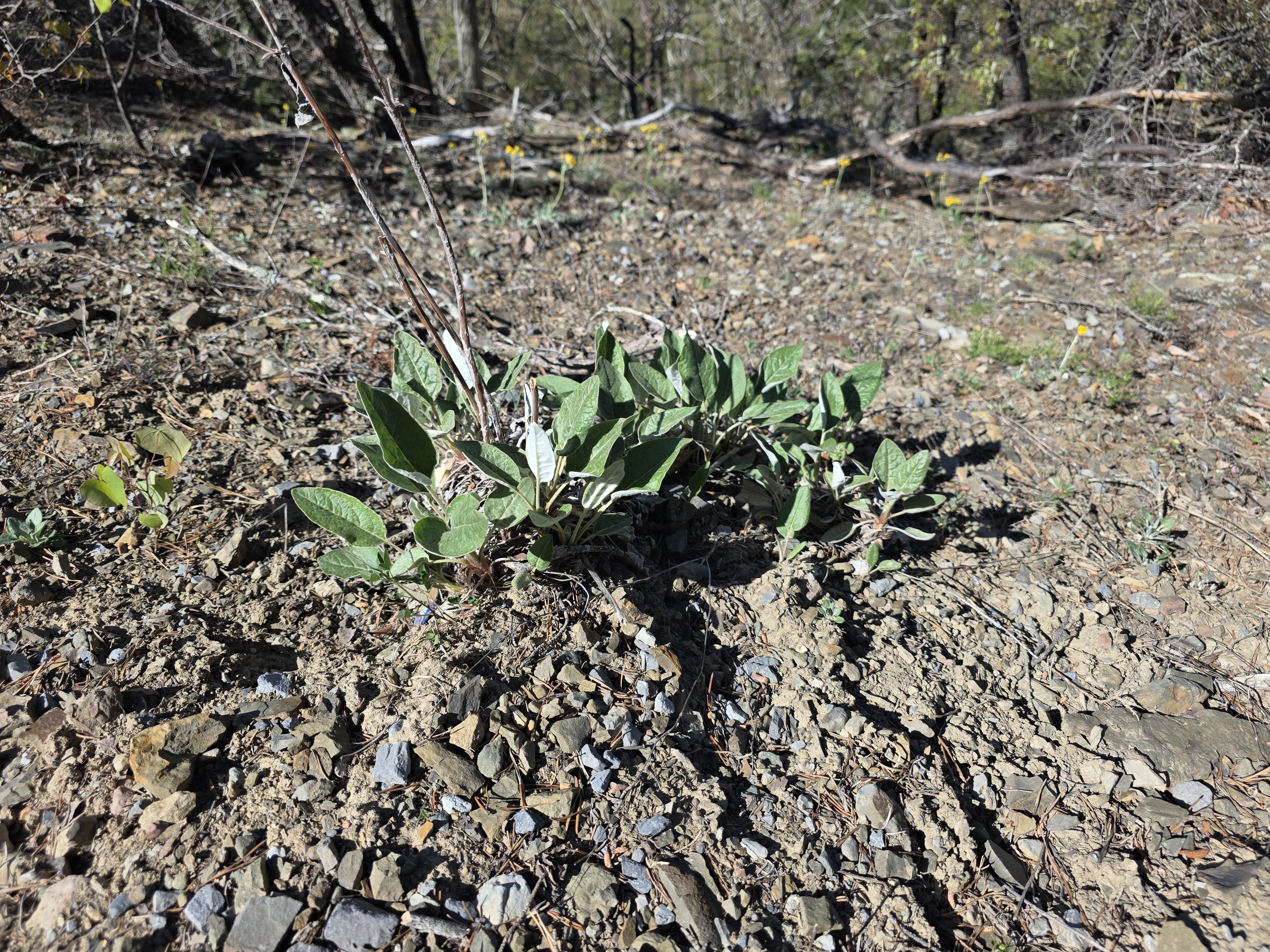
Plant in habitat

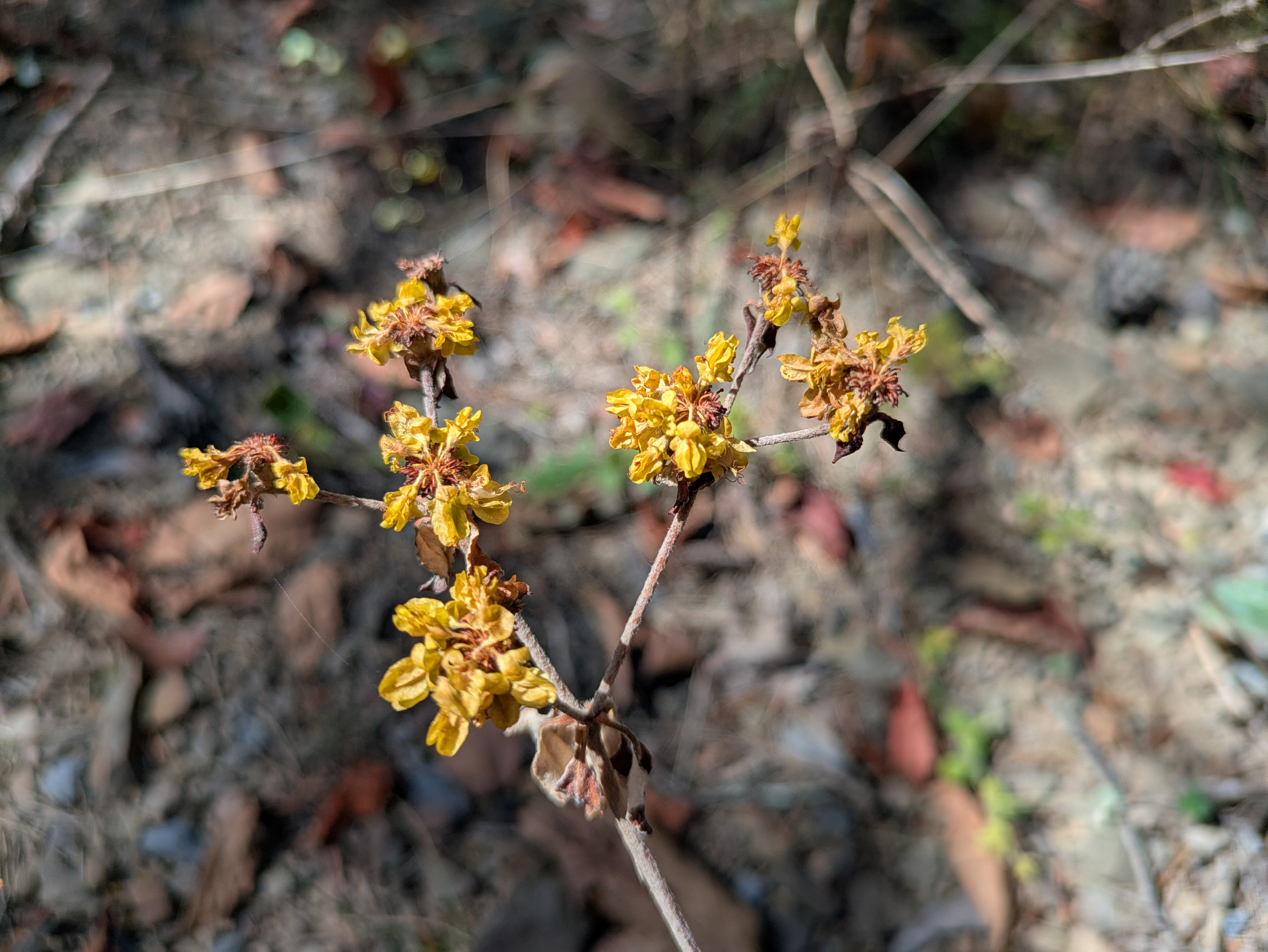
Fading flowers
