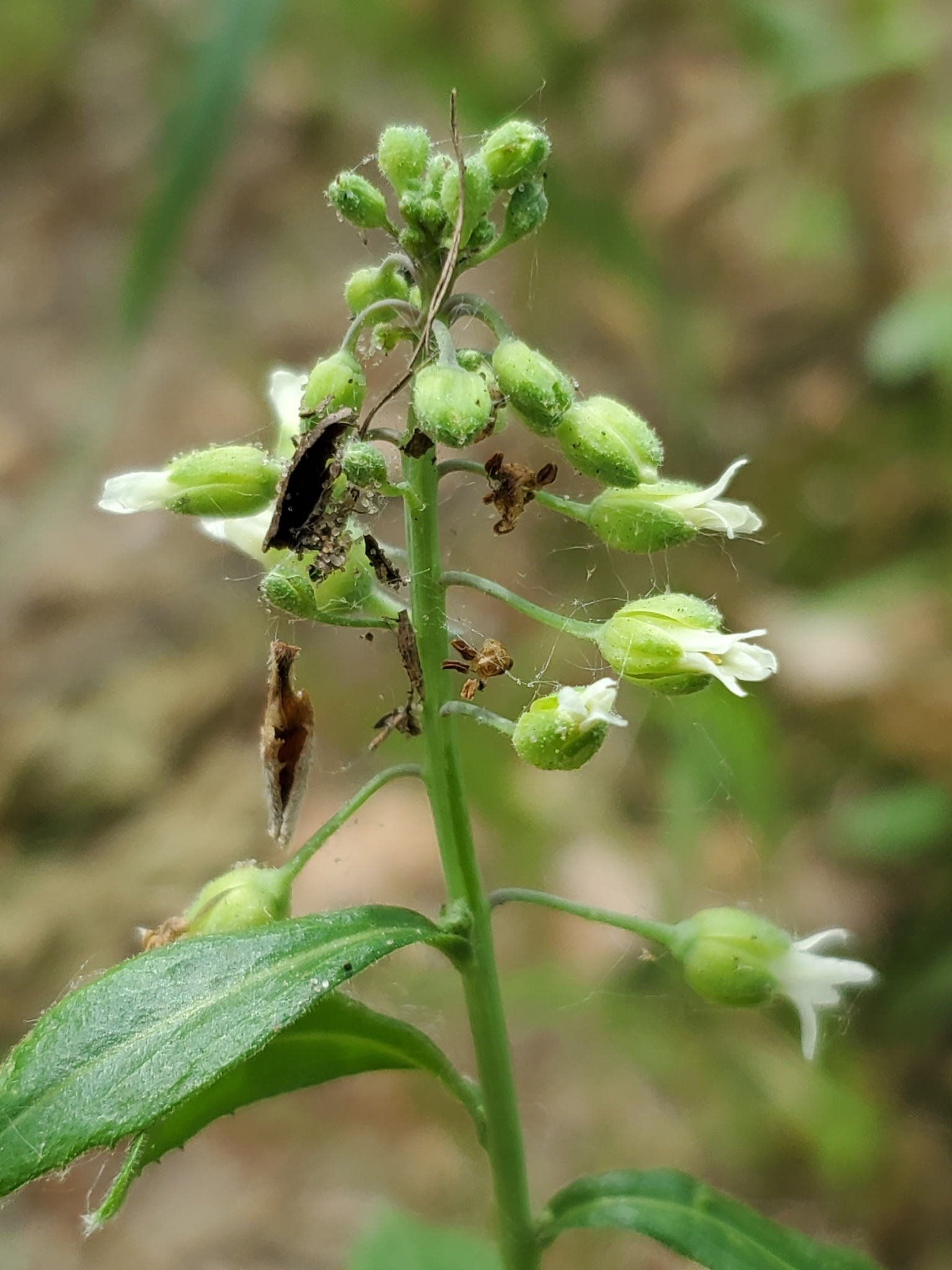
- Borodinia canadensis

Scientific classification
- Kingdom: Plantae
- Clade: Tracheophytes
- Clade: Angiosperms
- Clade: Eudicots
- Clade: Rosids
- Order: Brassicales
- Family: Brassicaceae
- Genus: Borodinia; Busch

Synonyms
- Shortia Raf.

= Borodinia (plant) =

Genus of flowering plants

Borodinia is a genus of flowering plants belonging to the family Brassicaceae. Species of the genus have a native range from southern Siberia and northern China, and from eastern Canada to the central and eastern United States. It was named by Nikolai Busch in 1921 to honor Ivan Borodin.

Species of this genus were formerly classified in the genus Boechera but were transferred to the genus Borodinia based on 2013 genetic analysis of this clade.

== Species ==
The following species are recognised in the genus Borodinia:

- Borodinia burkii (Porter) P.J.Alexander & Windham
- Borodinia canadensis (L.) P.J.Alexander & Windham - native to eastern and central USA and eastern Canada
- Borodinia dentata (Raf.) P.J.Alexander & Windham
- Borodinia laevigata (Muhl. ex Willd.) P.J.Alexander & Windham
- Borodinia macrophylla (Turcz.) O.E.Schulz - native to far eastern Russia
- Borodinia missouriensis (Greene) P.J.Alexander & Windham
- Borodinia perstellata (E.L.Braun) P.J.Alexander & Windham
- Borodinia serotina (E.S.Steele) P.J.Alexander & Windham - endemic to Virginia and West Virginia, USA;
