= Pyrgus centaureae wyandot =

Conservation status
- Critically Imperiled (NatureServe)

Scientific classification
- Kingdom: Animalia
- Phylum: Arthropoda
- Clade: Pancrustacea
- Class: Insecta
- Order: Lepidoptera
- Family: Hesperiidae
- Genus: Pyrgus
- Species: P. centaureae
- Subspecies: P. c. wyandot

Trinomial name
- Pyrgus centaureae wyandot (Edwards, 1863)

Subspecies of butterfly

Pyrgus centaureae wyandot, the Appalachian grizzled skipper, is a small, brown, gray and white butterfly known to inhabit parts of the Appalachian Highlands and Northern Michigan. It can be identified by its characteristic checkered wing pattern formed by the scales on the fore- and hindwings. The butterflies are known to prefer sites with minimal vegetation, such as open areas in hardwood forests, as well as sites of recent disturbance. The skipper's main larval food plants include Canada cinquefoil (Potentilla canadensis) and wild strawberry (Fragaria virginiana) depending on the specific population's range. The butterfly is listed as a federal species of concern and holds a state endangered title in Ohio and New Jersey.

== Description ==
The Appalachian grizzled skipper butterfly is a subspecies of the butterfly Pyrgus centaureae or northern grizzled skipper. The Appalachian skipper is characterized by its gray and brown top color, distinctive white checkered markings on the wings and wing edges as well as its unusual flight pattern. The butterflies are known to grow anywhere from around 29 to 33 millimeters in size. The grizzled skipper rarely flies above three feet off the ground and does so in quick, jerky movements. The skipper is hard to spot while flying because of its dingy color and its likeness to the exposed ground. When threatened, the butterfly typically lands in the vegetation, making it hard to find for predators.

== Habitat ==
The skipper's preferred habitats are now considered more varied than the original speculation that they only lived in shale barrens. Usually living in openings near pine or oak forests, the butterflies tend to populate sparsely vegetated, often disturbed, barrens with exposed rock or soil. One thing that does seem to remain a constant is the abundance of larval host plants in the populated area. Whether it is cinquefoil or wild strawberry, the grizzled skippers gravitate toward these plants as they act as a source of sustenance for both the butterfly larvae and the adults. A thriving population of Appalachian grizzled skippers was found inhabiting a distinct range of the Wayne National Forest in southern Ohio that has recently been developed for a new highway bypass project. Other known disturbed habitats the butterflies frequent are power lines, pipelines, forest roads, fire lanes, clear cuts and south-facing slopes.

== Mating and behavior ==
The Appalachian grizzled skipper is known to mate once a year in the months of April and May. The female lays her eggs on the underside of a host plant and the eggs typically hatch in eight to ten days. During mating season, which is the skipper's most active time of the year, the male patrols the populated area searching for prospective mates.

== Status and population decline ==
The Ohio Department of Natural Resources has classified the Appalachian grizzled skipper as a state endangered species due to declining population numbers in the state. One of the main causes of this decline is an unintended reaction to the spraying of pesticides aimed at controlling spongy moth populations. Many populations of spongy moths targeted to be sprayed with insecticides, such as diflubenzuron, were located on ridges with abundant oak trees, and Appalachian grizzled skippers may have been residing in or near these areas. This spraying has caused many populations to be extirpated in the Appalachian region and the state of New Jersey. Monitoring by conservationist groups coupled with state endangerment protection may prove successful at maintaining the remaining colonies.
