= Fourraea =

Scientific classification
- Kingdom: Plantae
- Clade: Tracheophytes
- Clade: Angiosperms
- Clade: Eudicots
- Clade: Rosids
- Order: Brassicales
- Family: Brassicaceae
- Genus: Fourraea; Greuter & Burdet
- Species: F. alpina

Binomial name
- Fourraea alpina (L.) Greuter & Burdet

Genus of plants

Fourraea alpina is a species of flowering plant in the family Brassicaceae, and the only member of the genus Fourraea. It is native to Europe, where its range extends from Spain in the west to Croatia in the east, and from Belgium and Czechia in the north to Italy in the south.

Its synonyms include:

- Arabis brassica (Leers) Rauschert
- Arabis brassiciformis Wallr.
- Arabis pauciflora (Grimm) Garcke
- Brassica alpina L.
- Caulopsis alpina (L.) Fourr.
- Caulopsis pauciflora (Grimm) A. Löve & D. Löve
- Conringia alpina (L.) Link
- Turritis brassica Leers
- Turritis pauciflora Grimm

It has a diploid chromosome number of 2n=14.

== Gallery ==
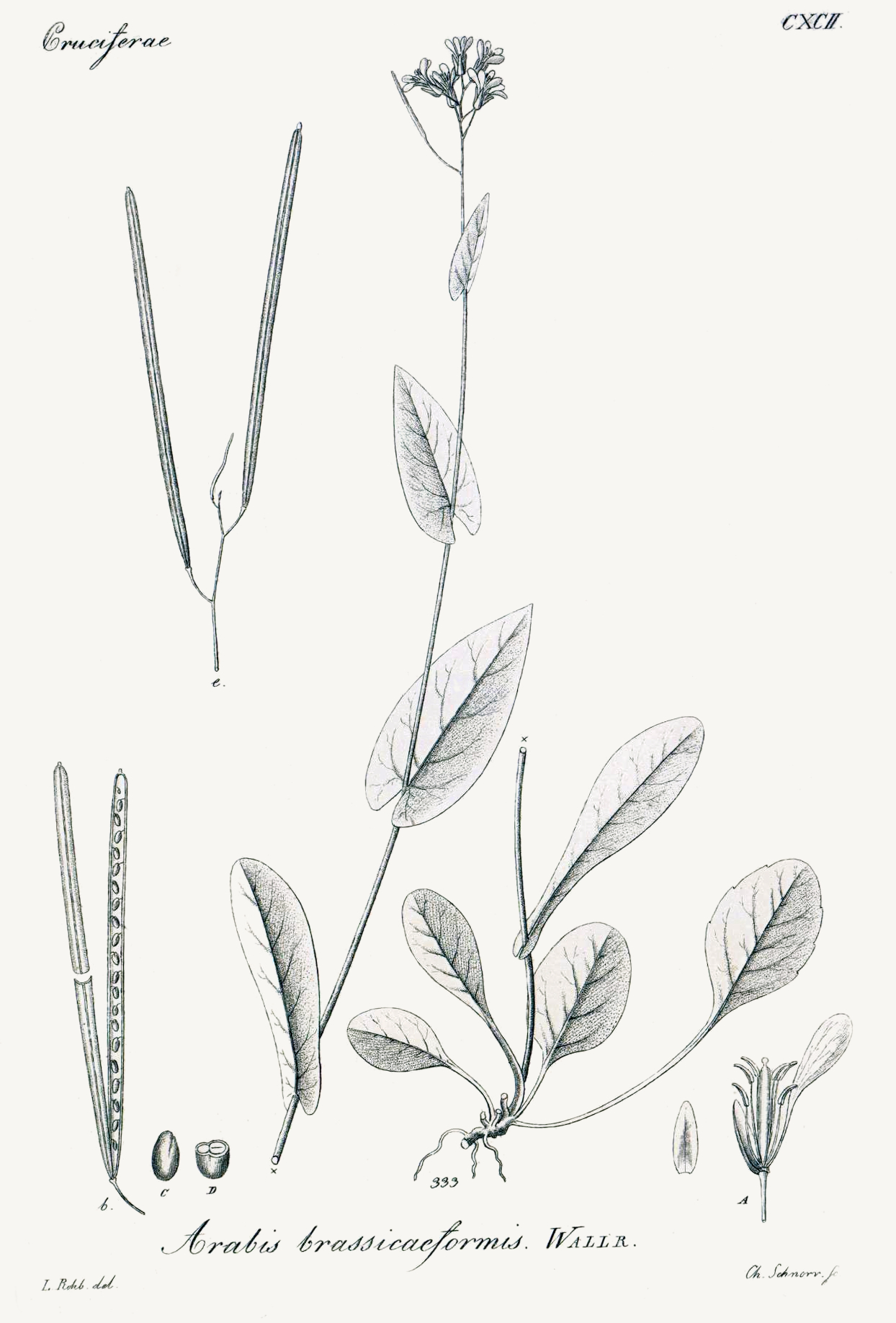

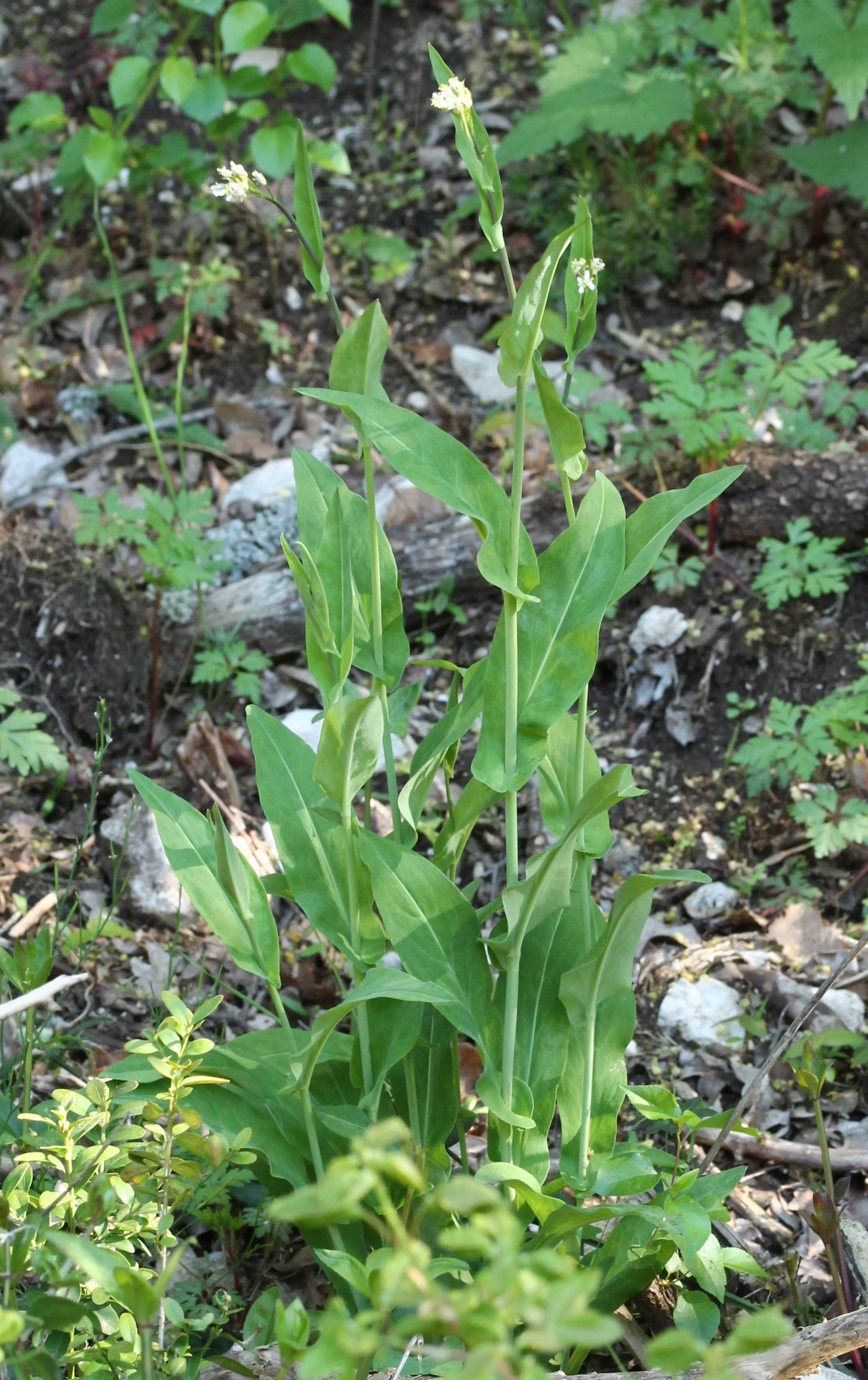

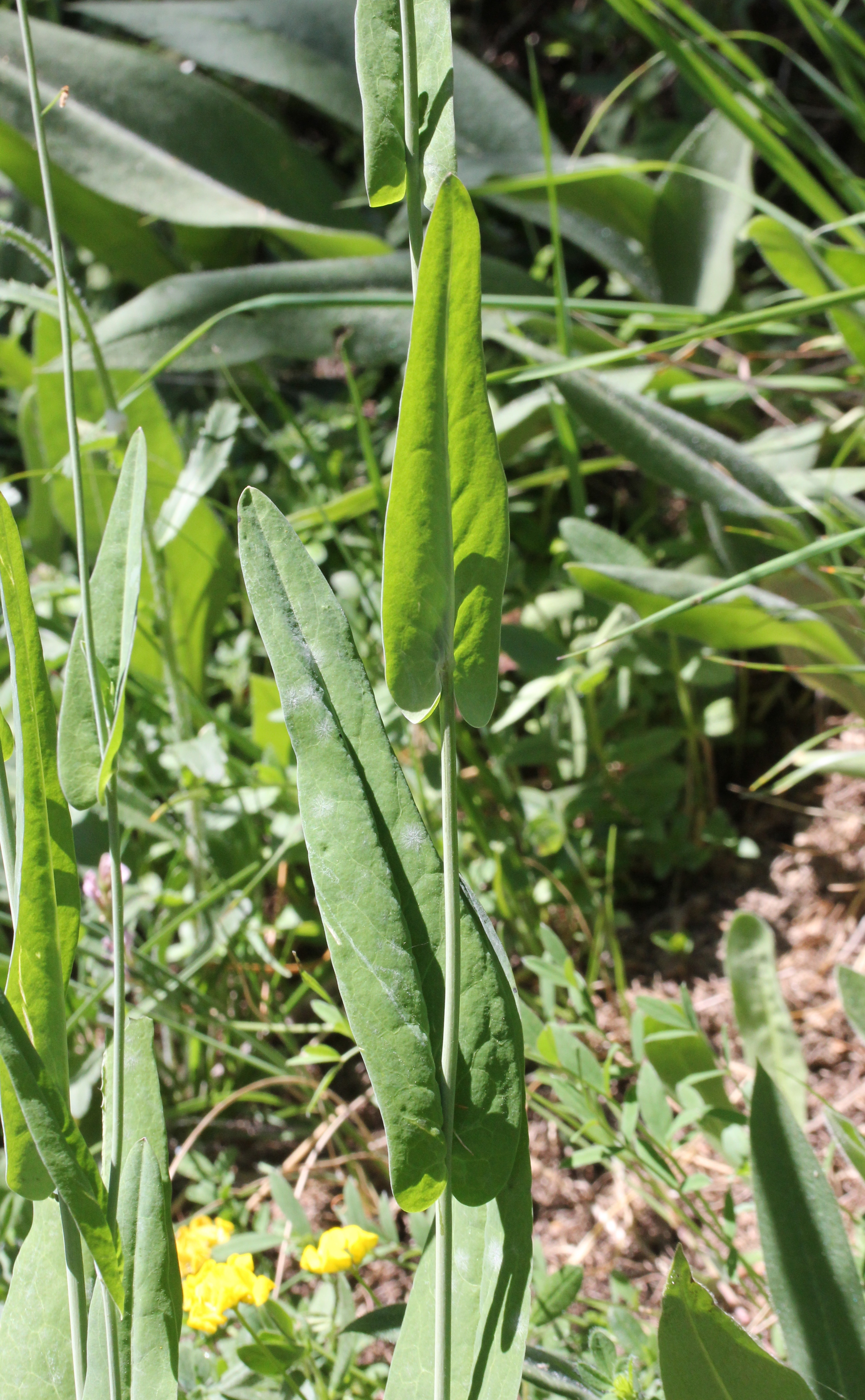

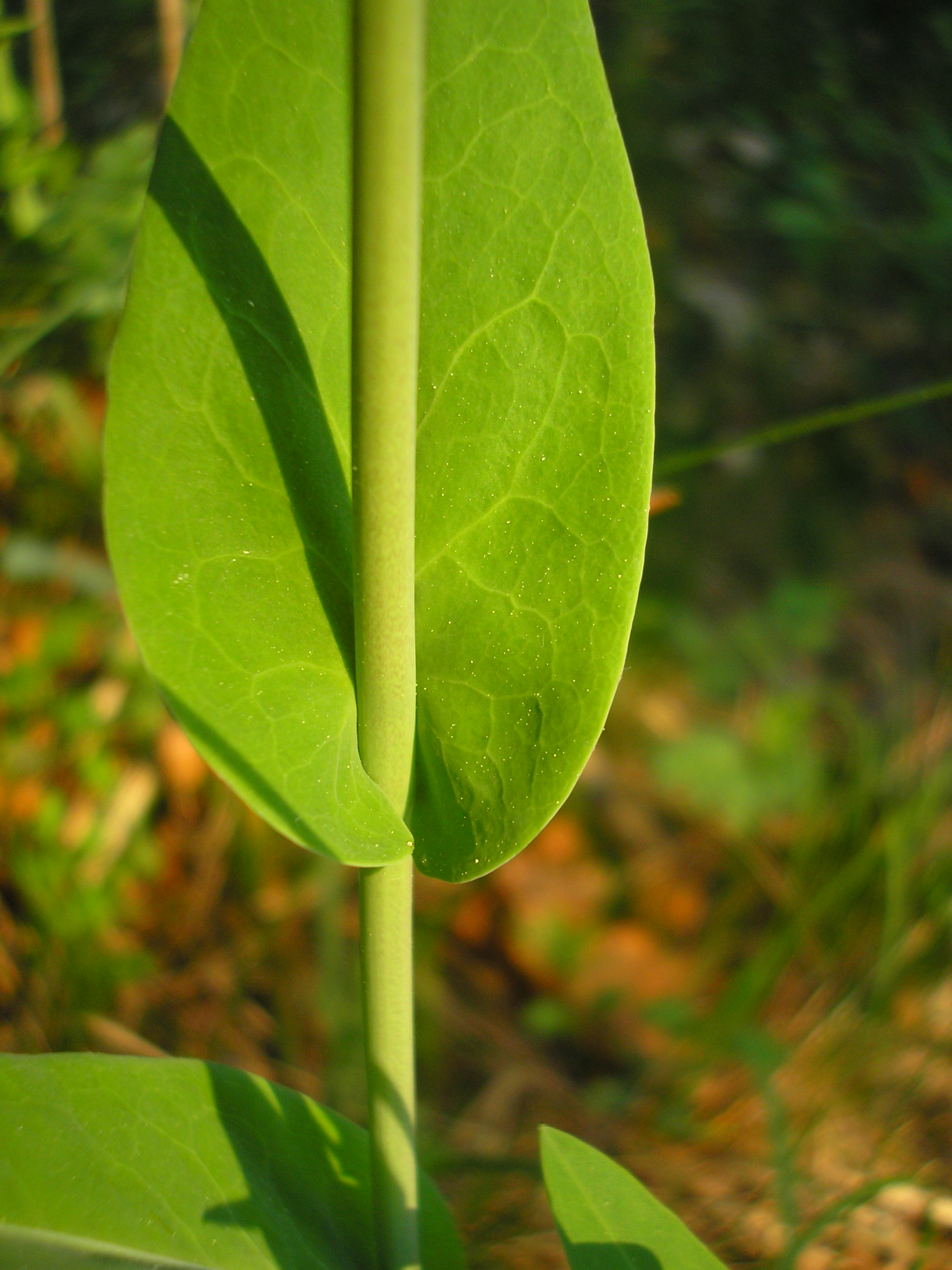

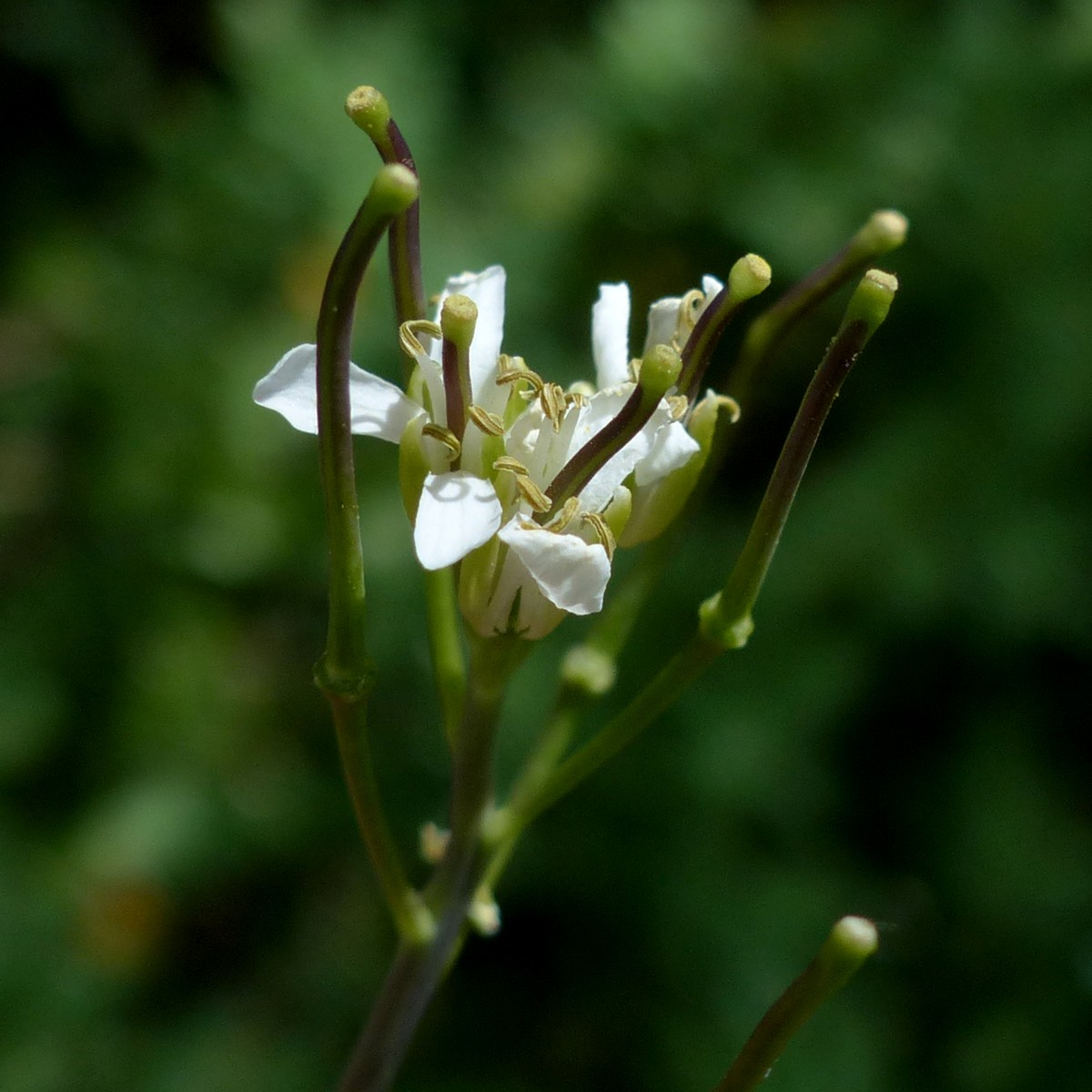
