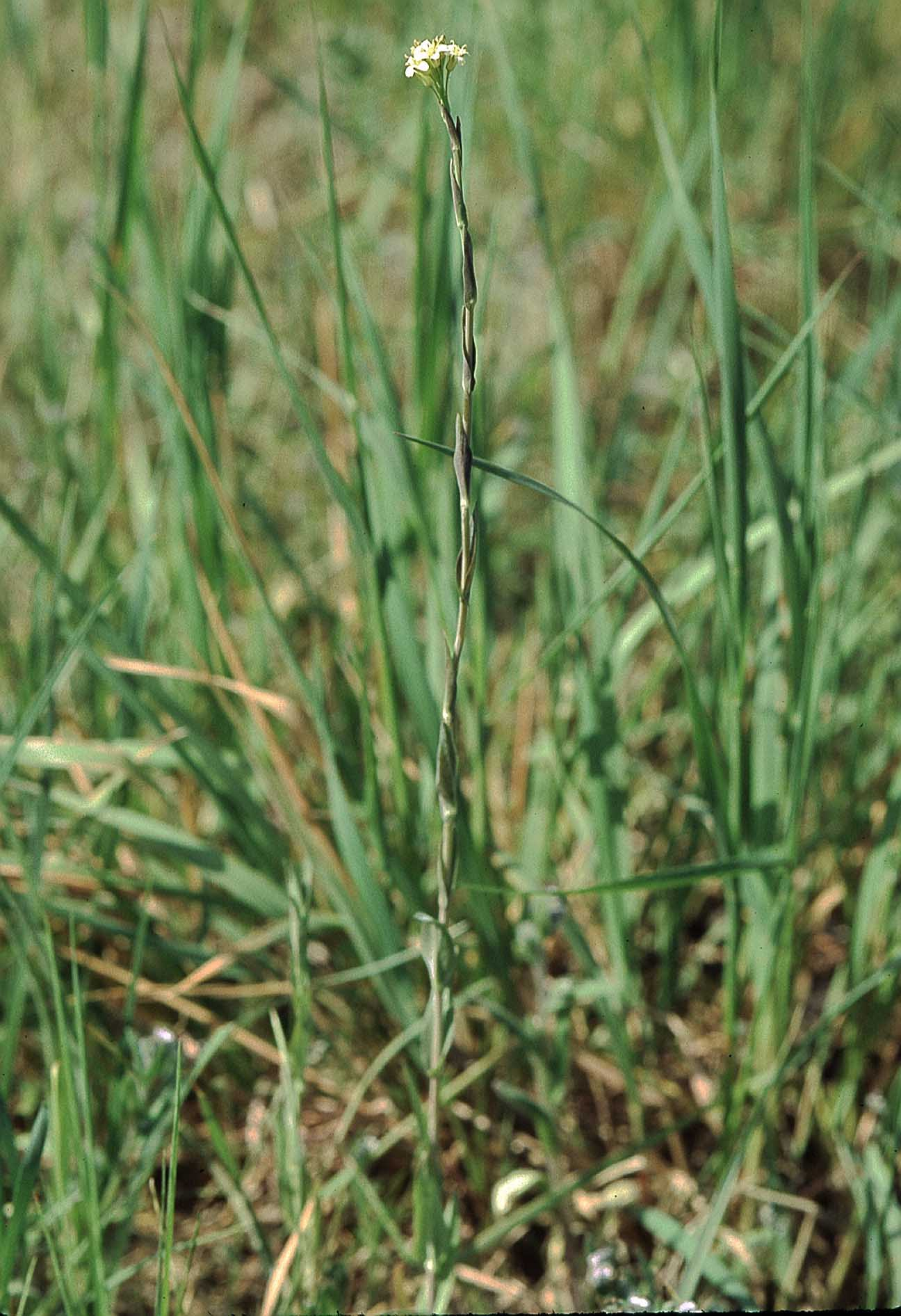

Conservation status
- Secure (NatureServe)

Scientific classification
- Kingdom: Plantae
- Clade: Tracheophytes
- Clade: Angiosperms
- Clade: Eudicots
- Clade: Rosids
- Order: Brassicales
- Family: Brassicaceae
- Genus: Turritis
- Species: T. glabra

Binomial name
- Turritis glabra (L.)

Synonyms
- List: Arabis columnalis Nakai; Arabis crepidiopoda Griseb. ex Pant.; Arabis excelsa Prokh.; Arabis glabra (L.) Bernh.; Arabis glabra f. columnalis (Nakai) M.Kim; Arabis glabra var. furcatipilis M.Hopkins; Arabis glabra subsp. pseudoturritis (Boiss. & Heldr.) Maire; Arabis glabra var. typica M.Hopkins; Arabis hirsuta var. glaucescens Caball.; Arabis macrocarpa Torr.; Arabis perfoliata (Neck.) Lam.; Arabis pseudoturritis Boiss. & Heldr.; Arabis turritis Vest; Crucifera turritis E.H.L.Krause; Erysimum glabrum (L.) Kuntze; Erysimum glastifolium Crantz; Erysimum pseudoturritis (Boiss. & Heldr.) Kuntze; Psilarabis glabra (L.) Fourr.; Sisymbrium simplicissimum Lapeyr.; Turritis dregeana Sond.; Turritis glabra f. glaberrima Kuusk; Turritis glabra var. lilacina O.E.Schulz; Turritis glabra var. ramosa DC.; Turritis macrocarpa Nutt.; Turritis perfoliata Neck.; Turritis pseudoturritis (Boiss. & Heldr.) Velen.; Turritis rigida Wall.; Turritis stricta Host

= Turritis glabra =

Species of plant

Turritis glabra, commonly known as tower rockcress or tower mustard, is a tall, slim, grey-green plant with small creamy flowers at the top of the stem. It usually grows on poor chalky or sandy soils, in open situations. It is native to Europe, Asia, and North Africa, and it is widespread in North America where it is also probably native. It can be found in many other parts of the world as an introduced species.

== Description ==
Tower mustard typically reaches 40 to 120 centimeters in height at full growth, but may be stunted to just 30 centimeters or might reach 1.5 meters in height in exceptional circumstances. It is typically a biennial herb, but may occasionally be a short lived perennial. Plants have a tap-root and fibrous side-roots. Plants usually have several erect, usually unbranched stems which are grey in the lower parts with a covering of simple hairs, but green and glabrous (hairless) above.

The leaves occur in a basal rosette initially, and later grow alternately on the main stem and branches. The basal leaves are blunt and toothed or pinnatifid and up to 15 cm long, whereas the stem and branch leaves become progressively smaller, less divided and more pointed, clasping the stem. The basal leaves are usually covered in hairs (pubescent) on the upper surface, but in rare cases they may be hairless. They vary in shape from spoon shape with a narrow base and wide at the end (spatulate), to being a narrow spear point with the widest point in the middle (oblanceolate), or a rounded rectangle longer than wide (oblong) with a broad point. They are typically 5 to 12 centimeters long, but may be only 4 cm or as much as 15 cm in length. The basal leaves are 1 to 3 centimeters in width.

The leaves on the stems (cauline leaves) are narrowed versions of the spear head shape (blade lanceolate), a somewhat more rounded rectangle (oblong-elliptic), or fully egg shaped with a wider base than end (ovate).

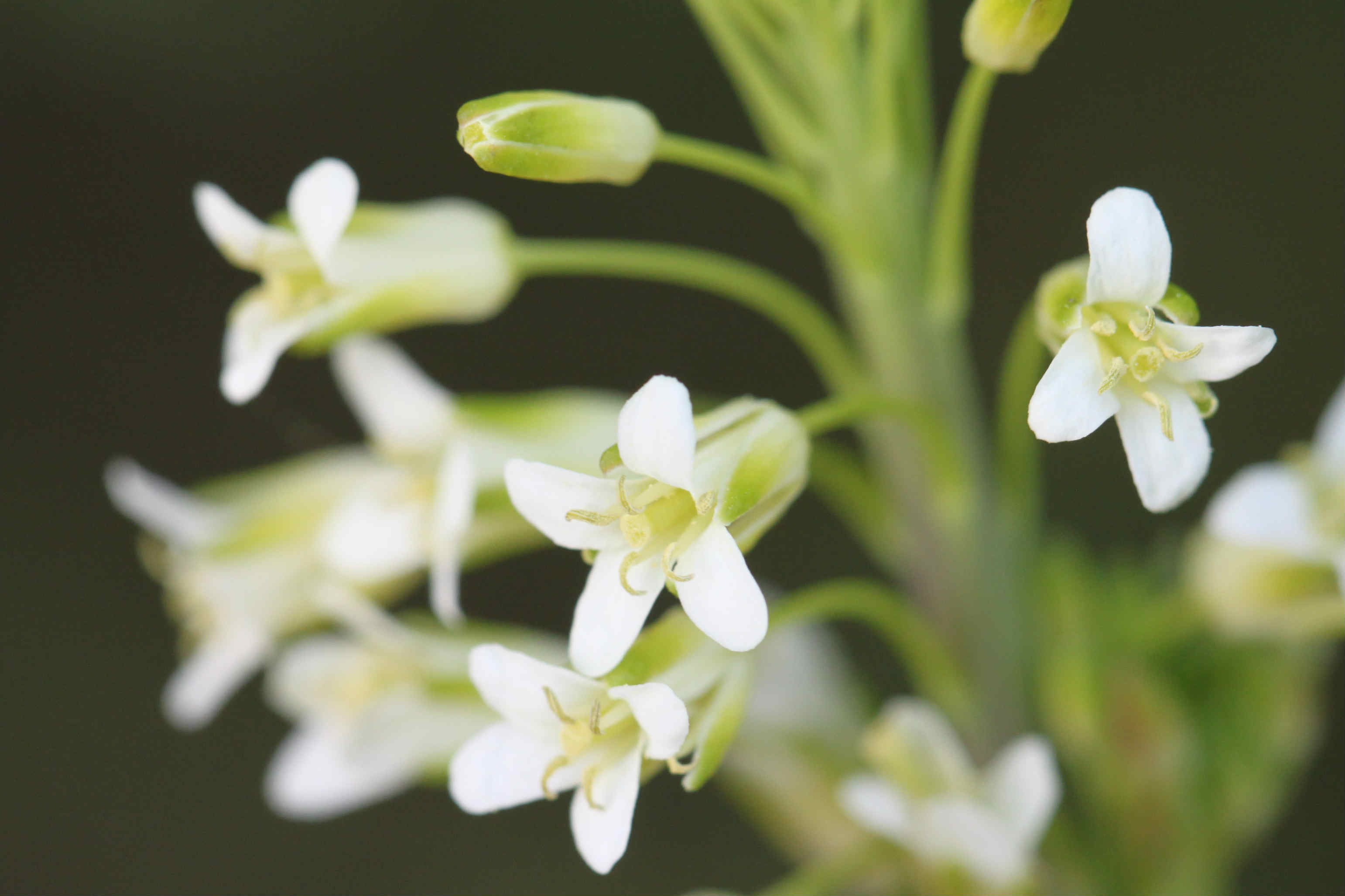
The flowers are cream or white, with 4 petals.

The inflorescence is a terminal raceme with numerous small, white flowers on small flower stems (pedicels) up to 2 centimeters long. There are four greenish sepals about 5 millimeters long; four pale yellow petals up to 1.7 cm long; 6 stamens and 1 style. The fruit is a greenish silique up to 8 cm long by 1.7 cm wide, flattened, and held vertically beside the stem.

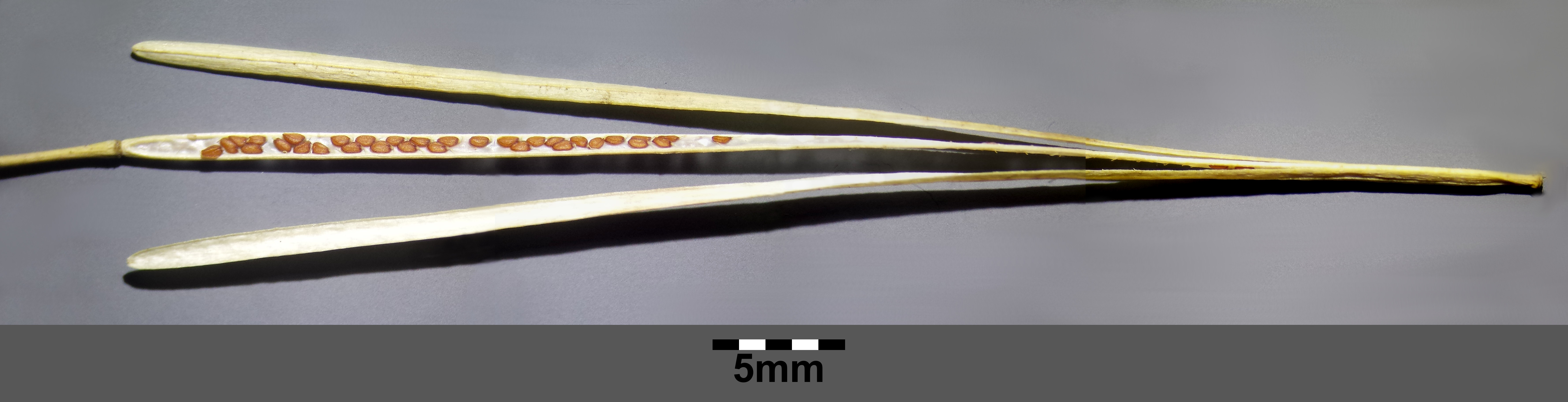
The fruit is a long, narrow silique with two rows of seeds in each valve.

== Taxonomy ==
Turritis glabra was given its first scientific name by Carl Linnaeus in 1753. In 1800 it was moved from Turritis to genus Arabis by Johann Jakob Bernhardi with than name Arabis glabra. Authors such as Hervé Maurice Burdet, James Cullen, and František Dvořák (1921–2016) maintained that the lack of white to purple flowers, not having seeds arranged in a single row in the pod like peas (uniserrately), and not having flattened fruits distinguishes the species in Turritis from Arabis. Botanists maintaining the contrary position such as Reed C. Rollins and Ihsan Ali Al-Shehbaz point to the ambiguous characteristics of some individuals in Turritis glabra and what they consider more critical features such as similar seed-coat anatomy and chemical similarities such as fatty-acid composition and glucosinolate content. Descriptions of this and other related species in North America in the 19th century accepted the classification in Turritis, but late in the century authors such as Asa Gray were treating it as synonymous with Arabis.

As of 2023 the most common classification is as Turritis glabra as listed in Plants of the World Online (POWO), World Flora Online, and in the Flora of North America.

=== Names ===
The genus name Turritis comes from Latin for tower as a reference to the narrow growth of the plant with the leaves and fruits upright and overlapping. Many of its common names similarly reference this such as "tower rockcress", "tower-mustard", and " towercress".

== Distribution and status ==
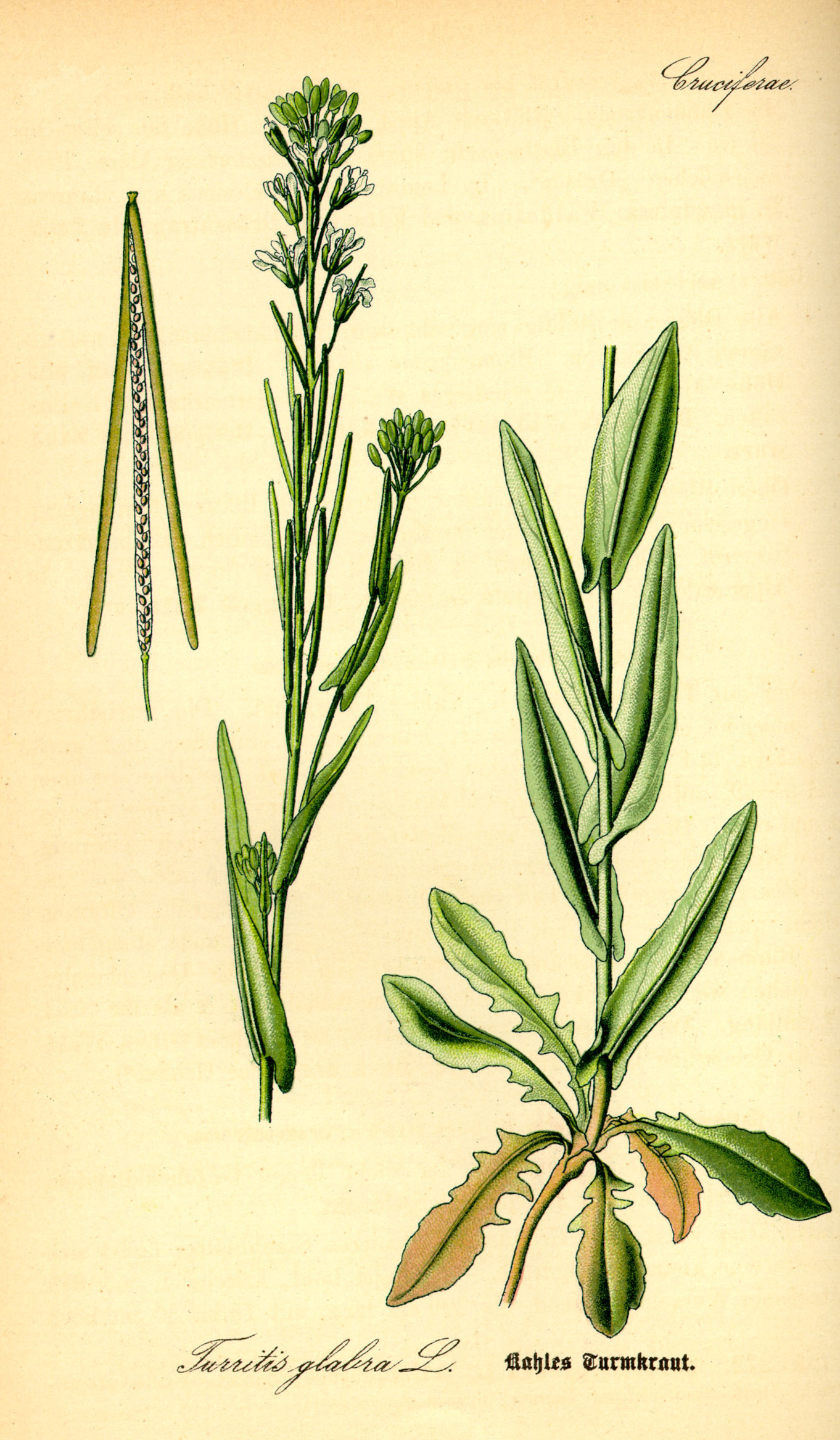
Illustration of Turritis glabra from Flora von Deutschland, Österreich und der Schweiz 1885

The native distribution of tower mustard is moderately uncertain with sources having some details of its range different. POWO lists it as native to all parts of Europe with the exceptions of Ireland, Sardinia, and Corsica.

They list it as growing in much of the northwest of Temperate Asia from Turkey and Iran northwards into central Asia and from Chita Oblast, Irkutsk Oblast, and Krasnoyarsk Krai westwards in Siberia. In the more southerly parts of Asia POWO lists it as native to Korea, Japan, Mongolia, Manchuria, north-central China, southeast China, Xinjiang, Nepal, and the western Himalayas. In addition they list it as introduced to Primorsky Krai, Sakhalin Island, and the Kuril Islands.

In Africa POWO lists it as native to Algeria, Kenya, Morocco, Rwanda, Tanzania, Uganda, and the Democratic Republic of the Congo, with it being introduced to Lesotho and two parts of South Africa, KwaZulu-Natal, the Cape Provinces, and the Northern Provinces.

In North America POWO lists it as native to all parts of Canada with the exceptions of Newfoundland and Labrador, Nova Scotia, Prince Edward Island, and Nunavut. It is also listed as native to all of the western United States, the north-central US from Missouri and Nebraska northwards, the northeastern US with the exception of Vermont, where they list it as introduced, and in the southeastern US states of Delaware, Kentucky, Maryland, North Carolina, Tennessee, and Virginia. NatureServe disagrees with some of these, not listing it as present in Maryland, present but not evaluated in Vermont, additionally introduced to Kansas, not native to Montana, and also present and evaluated in Georgia. They also do not list it as present in the Northwest Territories of Canada.

Finally Plants of the World Online lists it as introduced to the Australian states of New South Wales and Victoria.

It is classified as an endangered species in the UK and is considered to be facing a very high risk of extinction in the wild. It is listed as a Priority Species under the UK Biodiversity Action Plan. Only 35 sites are recorded by Plantlife mostly in Norfolk, (where 100 plants were found at a new site in 1999) but includes 6 sites near Kidderminster in Worcestershire.
