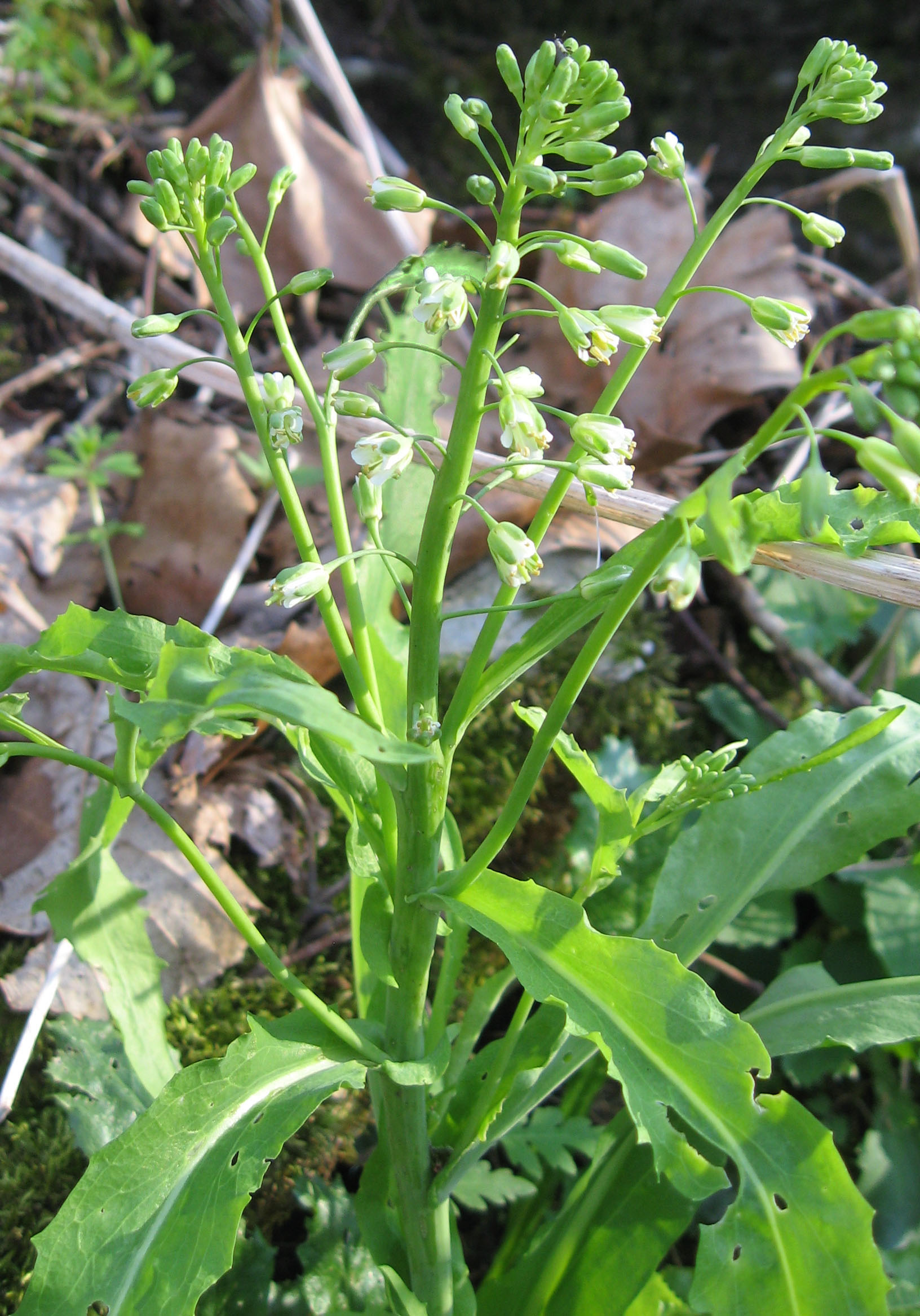

Scientific classification
- Kingdom: Plantae
- Clade: Tracheophytes
- Clade: Angiosperms
- Clade: Eudicots
- Clade: Rosids
- Order: Brassicales
- Family: Brassicaceae
- Genus: Borodinia
- Species: B. laevigata

Binomial name
- Borodinia laevigata (Muhlenberg ex Willdenow) Al-Shehbaz

Synonyms
- List: Arabis laevigata (Muhl. ex Willd.) Poir.; Boechera laevigata (Muhl. ex Willd.) Al-Shehbaz; Erysimum laevigatum (Muhl. ex Willd.) Kuntze; Turritis laevigata Muhl. ex Willd.; Arabis hastata Eaton; Arabis heterophylla Nutt.; Arabis laevigata var. heterophylla (Nutt.) Farw.; Arabis laevigata var. laciniata Torr. & A.Gray; Arabis laevigata var. minor Porter ex Alph.Wood; Arabis lyrifolia DC.; Arabis viridis var. heterophylla (Nutt.) Farw.

= Borodinia laevigata =

Species of flowering plant

Borodinia laevigata is a species of flowering plant in the mustard family known by the common name smooth rockcress. It is native to many areas of the eastern United States and Canada, where it grows in calcareous rocky woods and bluffs. It is moderately common throughout its range, although it is absent from the southeastern coastal plain and the far north.

This species is a biennial herb growing from a single stem. It flowers in early spring and has persistent fruit. It is differentiated from other species by its auriculate-clasping leaves, short white petals, and glaucous stem.

This species was moved to the genus Borodinia in 2013 following a genetic analysis.
