= List of Cardamine species =

List of wikimedia

Cardamine is a large, broadly distributed genus of flowering plants in the mustard family, Brassicaceae. As of January 2019, there are around 230 accepted species in Kew's Plants of the World Online. An additional 31 new species found in New Zealand were described in 2017 but are not listed in the Plants of the World Online database.

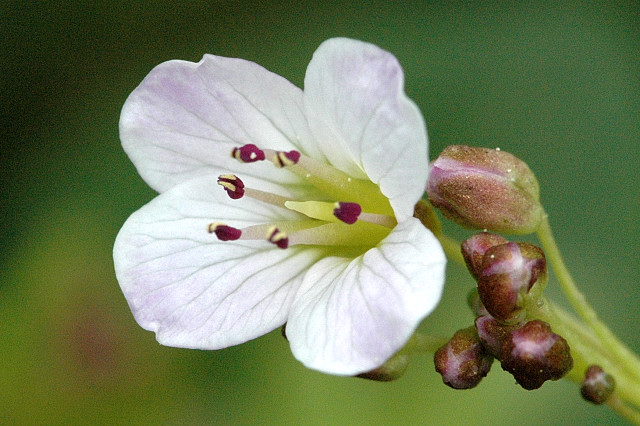
Cardamine amara

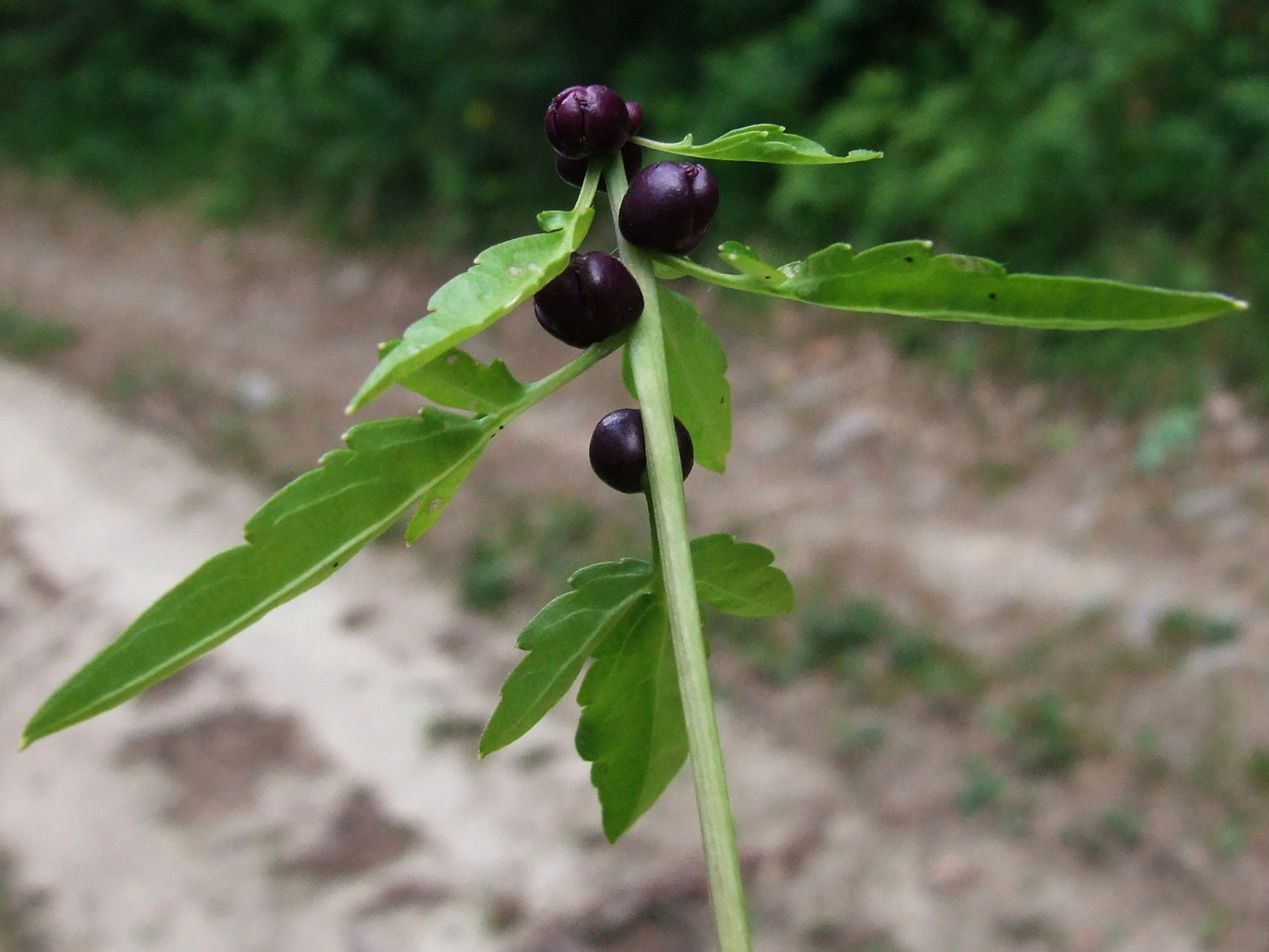
Cardamine bulbifera

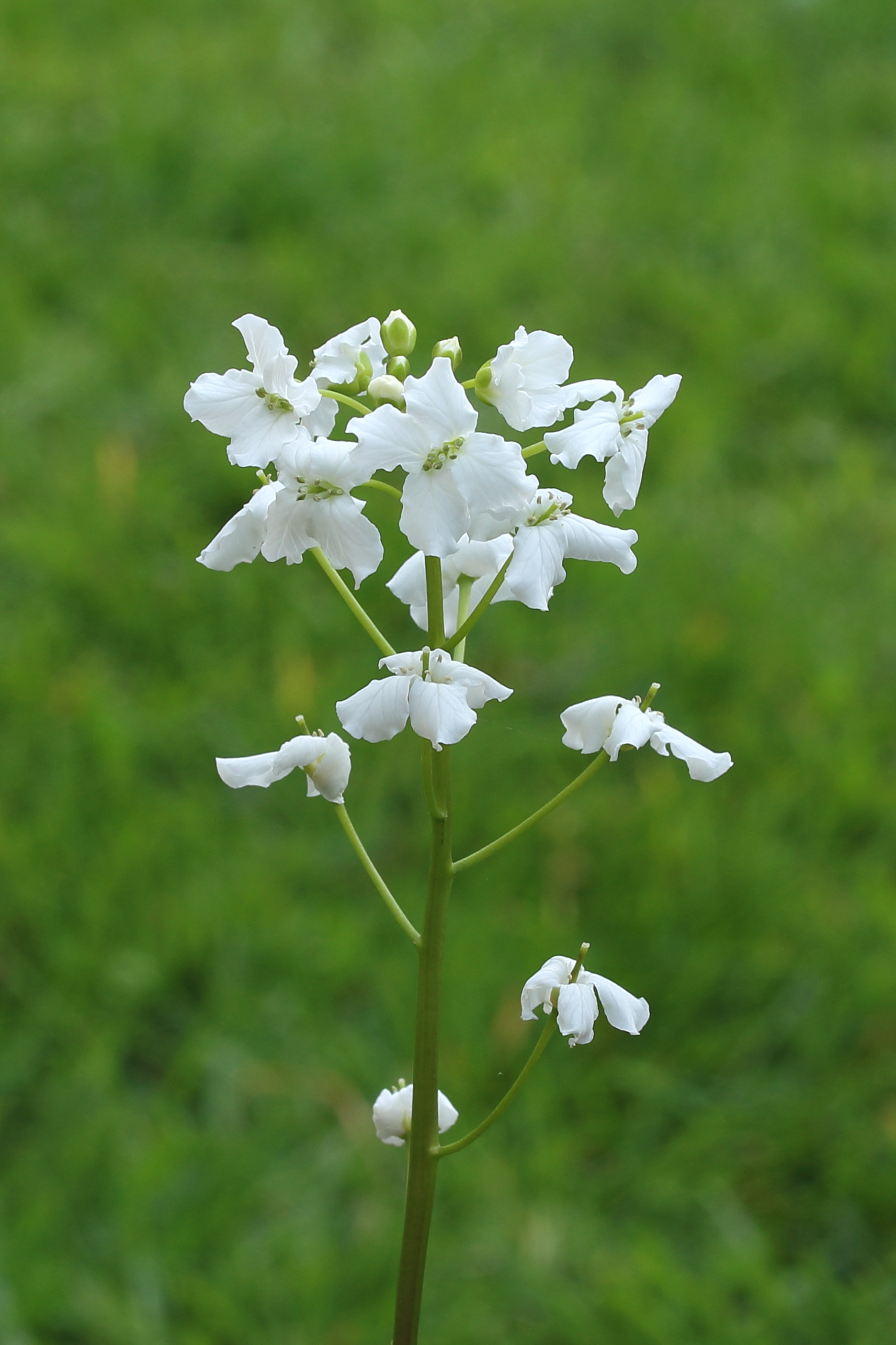
Cardamine trifolia

== By Latin name ==
- Cardamine abchasica Govaerts (Caucasus)
- Cardamine acris Griseb. (C Balkans, Colchis)
- Cardamine adriatica Jar.Kucera, Lihová & Marhold (Dalmatia)
- Cardamine africana L. (Paleotropis)
- Cardamine alalata Heenan (New Zealand)
- Cardamine alberti O.E.Schulz (N Andes)
- Cardamine altaica Lippmaa (U Irtysh, Ob, Yenisei)
- Cardamine alticola Heenan (NZ South Island)
- Cardamine altigena Schltr. ex O.E.Schulz (New Guinea Highlands)
- Cardamine amara L. (Europe, Transcaucasus, W Siberia)
- Cardamine anemonoides O.E.Schulz (Honshu, Shikoku, Kyushu)
- Cardamine angulata Hook. (NE Pacific)
- Cardamine angustata O.E.Schulz (E USA)
- Cardamine anhuiensis D.C.Zhang & C.Z.Shao (M/L Yangtze)
- Cardamine apennina Lihová & Marhold (N Apennines)
- Cardamine appendiculata Franch. & Sav. (N/C Honshu)
- Cardamine arakiana Koidz. (S Honshu)
- Cardamine armoracioides Turcz. (Orinoco)
- Cardamine asarifolia L. (C/W Alps, N Apennines)
- Cardamine astoniae I.Thomps. (SE Australia, Tasmania)
- Cardamine auriculata S.Watson (NE Mexico)
- Cardamine balnearia Standl. & Steyerm. (Guatemala)
- Cardamine barbaraeoides Halácsy (Pindus)
- Cardamine basicola Heenan (NZ South Island)
- Cardamine battagliae Cesca & Peruzzi (Calabria)
- Cardamine bellidifolia L. (Circumboreal, Alps, Pyrenees, Changbai, California)
- Cardamine bilobata Kirk (New Zealand)
- Cardamine bipinnata (C.A.Mey.) O.E.Schulz (Caucasus)
- Cardamine bisetosa Heenan (NZ North Island)
- Cardamine blaisdellii Eastw. (Beringia)
- Cardamine bodinieri (H.Lév.) Lauener (Xingren)
- Cardamine bonariensis Juss. ex Pers. (Neotropis)
- Cardamine breweri S.Watson (NW America)
- Cardamine bulbifera (L.) Crantz (Europe, Caucasus)
- Cardamine bulbosa (Schreb. ex Muhl.) Britton, Sterns & Poggenb. (NE America)
- Cardamine caesiella Heenan (NZ South Island)
- Cardamine calcicola W.W.Sm. (Yunnan)
- Cardamine caldeirarum Guthnick ex Seub. (Azores)
- Cardamine californica (Nutt.) Greene (NE Pacific)
- Cardamine calliphaea Kit Tan, Vold & Giannop. (W Elis)
- Cardamine calthifolia H.Lév. (Guangdong, Sichuan, Yunnan, Myanmar)
- Cardamine carnosa Waldst. & Kit. (S Balkans, Velebit, Lesbos)
- Cardamine caroides C.Y.Wu (Sichuan)
- Cardamine carrii B.L.Turner (South Texas)
- Cardamine castellana Lihová & Marhold (Asturias)
- Cardamine cebollana B.L.Turner (Nuevo León)
- Cardamine changbaiana Al-Shehbaz (Changbai)
- Cardamine chelidonia L. (Italy, Lika, Sardinia, Corsica)
- Cardamine chenopodiifolia Pers. (Southern Cone)
- Cardamine cheotaiyienii Al-Shehbaz & G.Yang (Inland S China)
- Cardamine chilensis DC. (Patagonia)
- Cardamine chiriensis Miyabe & Tatew. (Sakhalin)
- Cardamine chlorina Heenan (New Zealand)
- Cardamine circaeoides Hook.f. & Thomson (Sikkim, Bhutan, Temperate Indochina, S China, Taiwan)
- Cardamine clematitis Shuttlew. ex S.Watson (S Appalachians)
- Cardamine concatenata (Michx.) O.Schwarz (NE America)
- Cardamine conferta Jurtzev (Kolyma, Kamchatka)
- Cardamine constancei Detling (Clearwater, Coeur d'Alene)
- Cardamine cordata Barnéoud (S Andes)
- Cardamine cordifolia A.Gray (NW America)
- Cardamine coronata Heenan (NZ South Island)
- Cardamine corymbosa Hook.f. (New Zealand, Outlying Islands, Macquarie)
- Cardamine crassifolia Pourr. (Pyrenees, N/S Iberia)
- Cardamine cubita Molloy, Heenan & Smissen (NZ South Island)
- Cardamine dactyloides Heenan (NZ South Island)
- Cardamine debilis DC. (New Zealand)
- Cardamine delavayi Franch. (Bhutan, Yunnan, Sichuan)
- Cardamine densiflora Gontsch. (Sughd, Qashqadaryo)
- Cardamine depressa Hook.f. (New Zealand, Outlying Islands)
- Cardamine dichondroides (Speg.) Govaerts (C Chile, SW Argentina)
- Cardamine digitata Richardson (Beringia, W Nearctic tundra)
- Cardamine dilatata Heenan (NZ South Island)
- Cardamine dimidia Heenan (NZ South Island)
- Cardamine diphylla (Michx.) Alph.Wood (NE America)
- Cardamine dissecta (Leavenw.) Al-Shehbaz (Appalachia, outskirts)
- Cardamine dolichostyla Heenan (New Zealand)
- Cardamine douglassii Britton (E USA)
- Cardamine dubia Nicotra (Sicily)
- Cardamine elegantula Hook.f. & Thomson (C/E Himalayas, Assam)
- Cardamine eminentia Heenan (NZ South Island)
- Cardamine engleriana O.E.Schulz (Shaanxi, Gansu, Yangtze)
- Cardamine enneaphyllos (L.) Crantz (C Apennines, N Hellenides, Dinarides, C/E Alps, Tatras, Bohemia, Świętokrzyskie, Frankenjura)
- Cardamine exigua Heenan (NZ South Island)
- Cardamine fargesiana Al-Shehbaz (Chengkou)
- Cardamine fialae Fritsch (Herzegovina)
- Cardamine flaccida Cham. & Schltdl. (Neotropis?)
- Cardamine flagellifera O.E.Schulz (S Appalachians)
- Cardamine flexuosa With. (Europe)
- Cardamine forsteri Govaerts (New Zealand, Chatham)
- Cardamine fragariifolia O.E.Schulz (C/E Himalayas, Myanmar, S China)
- Cardamine franchetiana Diels (Qinghai, Tibet, Yunnan, Sichuan)
- Cardamine franklinensis I.Thomps. (SE Australia, Tasmania)
- Cardamine fulcrata Greene (S Central America, N South America)
- Cardamine geraniifolia (Poir.) DC. (Patagonia, S Andes)
- Cardamine glacialis (G.Forst.) DC. (Patagonia, Falklands)
- Cardamine glanduligera O.Schwarz (Tatras, Carpathians, outskirts)
- Cardamine glara Heenan (New Zealand)
- Cardamine glauca Spreng. ex DC. (Balkans, S Carpathians, C/S Italy, Sicily)
- Cardamine glechomifolia H.Lév. (Korea)
- Cardamine gouldii Al-Shehbaz (Bhutan)
- Cardamine gracilis (O.E.Schulz) T.Y.Cheo & R.C.Fang (E Himalayas, Yunnan)
- Cardamine graeca L. (Crimea, Balkans, S Carpathians, Italy, Sicily, Corsica, Aegean, Anatolia, Levant, Tunisia)
- Cardamine grandiscapa Heenan (NZ South Island)
- Cardamine granulifera (Franch.) Diels (Yunnan)
- Cardamine griffithii Hook.f. & Thomson (Tibet, Yunnan, Sichuan, C/E Himalayas)
- Cardamine guatemalensis Al-Shehbaz (Guatemala)
- Cardamine gunnii Hewson (SE Australia, Tasmania)
- Cardamine heleniae Heenan (New Zealand, Chatham)
- Cardamine heptaphylla (Vill.) O.E.Schulz (C/W Alps, Massif Central, Apennines, W European Plain)
- Cardamine hirsuta L. (Old World)
- Cardamine hispidula Phil. (Biobío, La Rioja
- Cardamine holmgrenii Al-Shehbaz (Blue Mountains)
- Cardamine hongdeyuana Al-Shehbaz (Tibet)
- Cardamine hupingshanensis K.M.Liu, L.B.Chen, H.F.Bai & L.H.Liu (Hunan)
- Cardamine hydrocotyloides W.T.Wang (Yunnan, Sichuan)
- Cardamine hygrophila T.Y.Cheo & R.C.Fang (Badong, Guangxi, Guizhou, Hunan, Sichuan)
- Cardamine impatiens L. (Palearctic)
- Cardamine incisa K.Schum. (Connecticut)
- Cardamine innovans O.E.Schulz (Oaxaca)
- Cardamine integra Heenan (NZ South Island)
- Cardamine intonsa Heenan (New Zealand)
- Cardamine jamesonii Hook. (N South America)
- Cardamine jejuna Standl. & Steyerm. (S Central America)
- Cardamine jonselliana Al-Shehbaz (Uganda)
- Cardamine keysseri O.E.Schulz (New Guinea Highlands)
- Cardamine kitaibelii Bech. (N Dinarides, C Alps, Apennines)
- Cardamine komarovii Nakai (Korean Peninsula)
- Cardamine kruesselii Johow ex Reiche (Juan Fernández)
- Cardamine kuankuoshuiense M.T.An, Yun Lin & Y.B.Yang (Guizhou)
- Cardamine lacustris (Garn.-Jones & P.N.Johnson) Heenan (NZ South Island)
- Cardamine lanceolaris Linden & Planch. (Venezuela)
- Cardamine latior Heenan (NZ South Island)
- Cardamine lazica Boiss. & Balansa (Colchis, Pontus)
- Cardamine leucantha (Tausch) O.E.Schulz (Manchuria, North China Plain, Sakhalin, Korea, Japan)
- Cardamine lihengiana Al-Shehbaz (Yunnan)
- Cardamine lilacina Hook. (SE Australia, Tasmania)
- Cardamine lineariloba I.Thomps. (SE Australia)
- Cardamine lojanensis Al-Shehbaz (Cordillera Central of Ecuador)
- Cardamine longii Fernald (E USA Coast)
- Cardamine longipedicellata Rollins (N Central America)
- Cardamine loxostemonoides O.E.Schulz (Himalayas, Tibet, Yunnan)
- Cardamine lyrata Bunge (Cisbaikalia, Manchuria, Japan, Korea, Mongolia, Hebei South China)
- Cardamine macrocarpa Brandegee (SW Texas, NE Mexico)
- Cardamine macrophylla Willd. (Temperate C/E Asia)
- Cardamine macrostachya Phil. (Subtropical SC Chile)
- Cardamine manshurica (Kom.) Nakai (Primorye, Korea)
- Cardamine marginata Phil. (Temperate SC Chile)
- Cardamine marholdii Tzvelev (U Tisza)
- Cardamine maritima DC. (Littoral Dalmatia)
- Cardamine matthioli Moretti (Central Europe, Balkans)
- Cardamine maxima (Nutt.) Alph.Wood (Great Lakes region)
- Cardamine megalantha Heenan (Stewart Island)
- Cardamine mexicana O.E.Schulz (NE Mexico)
- Cardamine micranthera Rollins (U Dan River)
- Cardamine microphylla Adams (C/E Siberia, Beringia, W Nearctic tundra)
- Cardamine microthrix I.Thomps. (CE/SE Australia)
- Cardamine microzyga O.E.Schulz (Tibet, Sichuan)
- Cardamine moirensis I.Thomps. (SE Australia)
- Cardamine monteluccii Brilli-Catt. & Gubellini (Italy, Sicily)
- Cardamine montenegrina Jar.Kucera, Lihová & Marhold (Montenegro)
- Cardamine multiflora T.Y.Cheo & R.C.Fang (Sichuan, Yunnan)
- Cardamine multijuga Franch. (Yunnan)
- Cardamine mutabilis Heenan (New Zealand)
- Cardamine nepalensis N.Kurosaki & H.Ohba (C/E Himalayas)
- Cardamine niigatensis H.Hara (Honshu, Sado)
- Cardamine nipponica Franch. & Sav. (Hokkaido, Honshu, Taiwan)
- Cardamine nuttallii Greene (NE Pacific)
- Cardamine nymanii Gand. (Arctic)
- Cardamine obliqua Hochst. ex A.Rich. (C Afromontane, N Andes, N Mexico)
- Cardamine occidentalis (S.Watson ex B.L.Rob.) Howell (NE Pacific)
- Cardamine occulta Hornem. (India, Indochina, C/E China, Korea, Yaponesia, Taiwan, Philippines, Sulawesi, S Sundaland)
- Cardamine ocoana O.E.Schulz (E Hispaniola)
- Cardamine oligosperma Nutt. (Aleutians, NE Pacific)
- Cardamine ovata Benth. (S Central America, N/C Andes)
- Cardamine pacensis Romero (Bolivian Altiplano)
- Cardamine pachyphylla Heenan (NZ South Island)
- Cardamine pachystigma (S.Watson) Rollins (California)
- Cardamine papillata I.Thomps.
- Cardamine papuana (Lauterb.) O.E.Schulz
- Cardamine parviflora L.
- Cardamine parvula Heenan (NZ North Island)
- Cardamine pattersonii L.F.Hend.
- Cardamine paucifolia Hand.-Mazz.
- Cardamine paucijuga Turcz.
- Cardamine pectinata Pall. ex DC.
- Cardamine pedata Regel & Tiling
- Cardamine penduliflora O.E.Schulz
- Cardamine pensylvanica Muhl. ex Willd.
- Cardamine pentaphyllos (L.) Crantz
- Cardamine penzesii Ancev & Marhold
- Cardamine picta Hook.
- Cardamine plumieri Vill.
- Cardamine polyodontes Heenan (New Zealand)
- Cardamine porphyroneura Heenan (NZ South Island)
- Cardamine pratensis L.
- Cardamine prorepens Fisch. ex DC.
- Cardamine pseudotrifoliolata Al-Shehbaz
- Cardamine pulchella (Hook.f. & Thomson) Al-Shehbaz & G.Yang
- Cardamine purpurascens (O.E.Schulz) Al-Shehbaz & al.
- Cardamine purpurea Cham. & Schltdl.
- Cardamine quinquefolia (M.Bieb.) Schmalh.
- Cardamine ramosa Rollins
- Cardamine raphanifolia Pourr.
- Cardamine repens (Franch.) Diels
- Cardamine reptans Heenan (NZ South Island)
- Cardamine resedifolia L.
- Cardamine rhizomata Rollins
- Cardamine robusta I.Thomps.
- Cardamine rockii O.E.Schulz
- Cardamine rostrata Griseb.
- Cardamine rotundifolia Michx.
- Cardamine rupestris (O.E.Schulz) K.Malý
- Cardamine rupicola (O.E.Schulz) C.L.Hitchc.
- Cardamine scaposa Franch.
- Cardamine schinziana O.E.Schulz
- Cardamine sciaphila Heenan (NZ South Island)
- Cardamine scutata Thunb.
- Cardamine seravschanica Botsch.
- Cardamine serbica Pancic
- Cardamine serpentina Heenan (NZ South Island)
- Cardamine silana Marhold & Perný
- Cardamine simplex Hand.-Mazz.
- Cardamine sinuatifolia Heenan (NZ South Island)
- Cardamine speciosa Britton
- Cardamine stenoloba Hemsl.
- Cardamine subcarnosa (Hook.f.) Allan
- Cardamine subterranea Larrañaga
- Cardamine tanakae Franch. & Sav.
- Cardamine tangutorum O.E.Schulz
- Cardamine tenera S.G.Gmel. ex C.A.Mey.
- Cardamine tenuifolia Hook.
- Cardamine tenuirostris Hook. & Arn.
- Cardamine tepelenensis F.K.Mey.
- Cardamine thalassica Heenan (NZ South Island)
- Cardamine thyrsoidea O.E.Schulz
- Cardamine tianqingiae Al-Shehbaz & Boufford
- Cardamine trichocarpa Hochst. ex A.Rich.
- Cardamine trifida (Lam. ex Poir.) B.M.G.Jones
- Cardamine trifolia L.
- Cardamine trifoliolata Hook.f. & Thomson
- Cardamine tryssa I.Thomps.
- Cardamine tuberosa DC.
- Cardamine uliginosa M.Bieb.
- Cardamine umbellata Greene
- Cardamine unguiculus Heenan (NZ South Island)
- Cardamine unicaulis Heenan (New Zealand, Stewart Island)
- Cardamine variabilis Phil.
- Cardamine verna Heenan (NZ South Island)
- Cardamine victoris N.Busch
- Cardamine violacea (D.Don) Wall.
- Cardamine volckmannii Phil.
- Cardamine vulgaris Phil.
- Cardamine waldsteinii Dyer
- Cardamine xinfenii Al-Shehbaz
- Cardamine yezoensis Maxim.
- Cardamine yunnanensis Franch.
- Cardamine zollingeri Turcz.

Named hybrids include:

- Cardamine × ambigua O.E.Schulz
- Cardamine × digenea (Gremli) O.E.Schulz
- Cardamine × enriquei Marhold, Lihová & Perný
- Cardamine × grafiana O.E.Schulz
- Cardamine × insueta Urbanska-Worytkiewicz
- Cardamine × keckii A.Kern.
- Cardamine × killiasii (Brügger) Brügger
- Cardamine × paxiana O.E.Schulz
- Cardamine × rhodopaea Ancev
- Cardamine × schulzii Urbanska-Worytkiewicz
- Cardamine × undulata De Laramb. & Timb.-Lagr.
- Cardamine × wettsteiniana O.E.Schulz
