= Pepper root =

Pepper root is a common name for several plants and may refer to:

- Cardamine concatenata
- Cardamine diphylla
