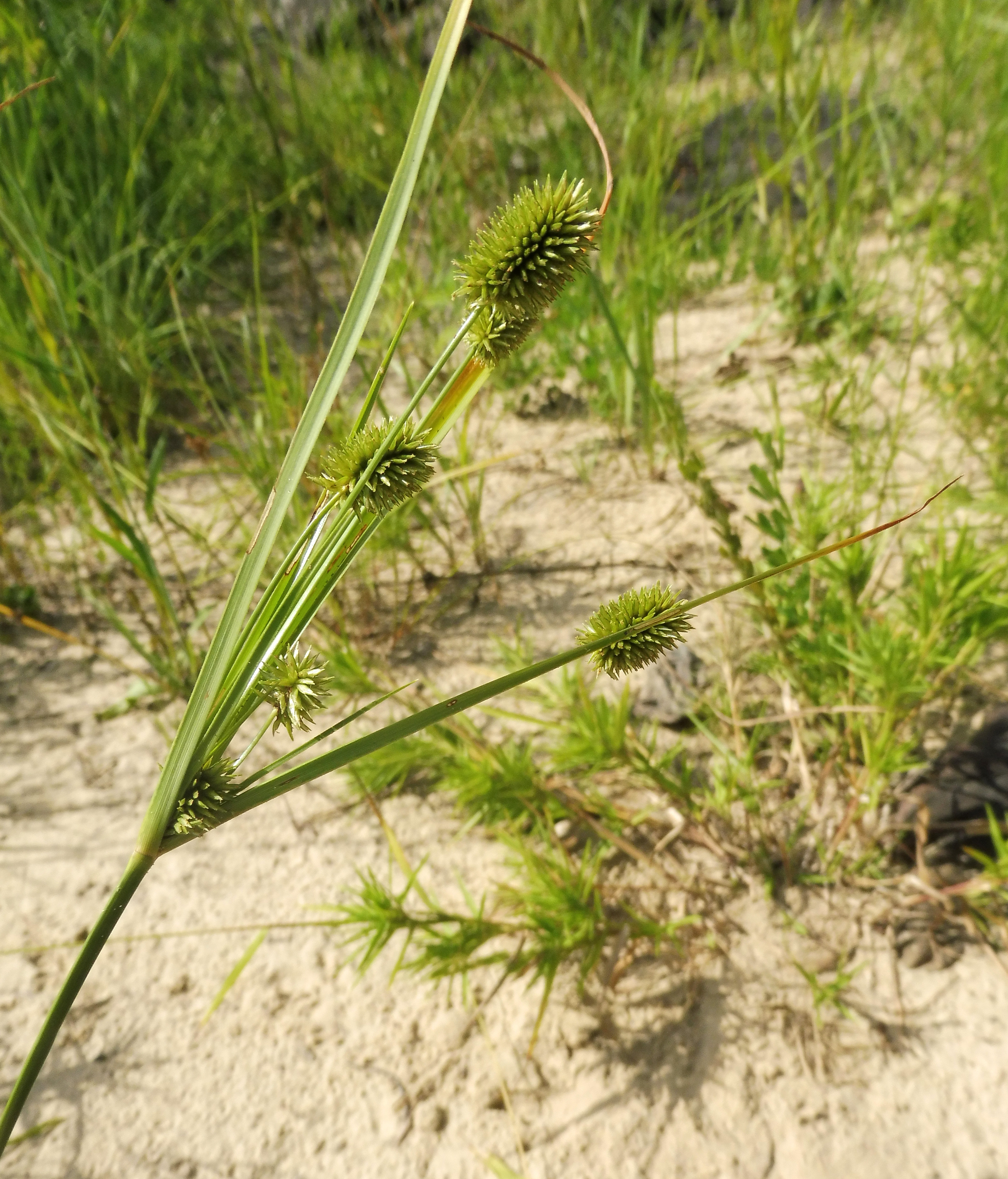

Scientific classification
- Kingdom: Plantae
- Clade: Tracheophytes
- Clade: Angiosperms
- Clade: Monocots
- Clade: Commelinids
- Order: Poales
- Family: Cyperaceae
- Genus: Cyperus
- Species: C. retrorsus

Binomial name
- Cyperus retrorsus Chapm.

= Cyperus retrorsus =

Species of plant

Cyperus retrorsus, commonly called pine barren flatsedge, is a species of flowering plant in the sedge family (Cyperaceae). It is found primarily in the Southeastern United States, with a range extending north to Martha's Vineyard, Massachusetts and south to Tamaulipas, Mexico. Its natural habitat corresponds to dry sandy soils, open woodlands and thickets.

Cyperus retrorsus is a tufted perennial, growing to around 50 cm (20 in) tall. Its fruits mature in the summer. It is similar to the closely related C. echinatus, from which C. retrorsus can be distinguished by its cylindrical inflorescence and shorter stature.

== See also ==
- List of Cyperus species
