= Goyang (fermented food) =

Fermented vegetable food of the Sherpa

Goyang is a fermented, lightly acidic vegetable food of the Himalayan Sherpa people of Sikkim state and Darjeeling hills of India, and Nepal. It is prepared during the summer monsoon season when the leaves of the wild plant Cardamine macrophylla Willd., with the local name magane-saag, belonging to the family Brassicaceae are available abundantly for picking in the surrounding hillside.

== Preparation ==
The magane-saag leaves are collected, washed, cut, drained, and pressed into bamboo baskets lined with local fig leaves. The baskets are covered with more fig leaves and stored at room temperature for nearly a month, allowing the magane-saag leaves to ferment. The goyang is now ready and transferred to airtight containers where it is stored for two or three months. If the fermented goyang is shaped into tightly-pressed balls and dried in the sun for several days, its shelf life may be extended.

== Culinary practice ==
Goyang is most commonly prepared in Sherpa homes, there being no reports of its sale in the markets. It is generally boiled with yak meat or beef, along with noodles, to make a thukpa of heavy consistency, a regularly eaten Sherpa food.

== Bibliography ==
- Tamang, Jyoti Prakash (2010), Himalayan fermented foods: Microbiology, Nutrition and Ethnic Values, Boca Raton: CRC Press, ISBN 978-1-4200-9324-7
- Tamang, Jyoti Prakash; Thapa, Namrata; Bhalla, Tek Chand; Savitri (2016), "Ethnic Fermented Foodsand Beverages of India", in Tamang, J. P. (ed.), Ethnic Fermented Foods and Alcoholic Beverages of Asia, Springer, pp. 17–72, ISBN 978-81-322-2798-4
