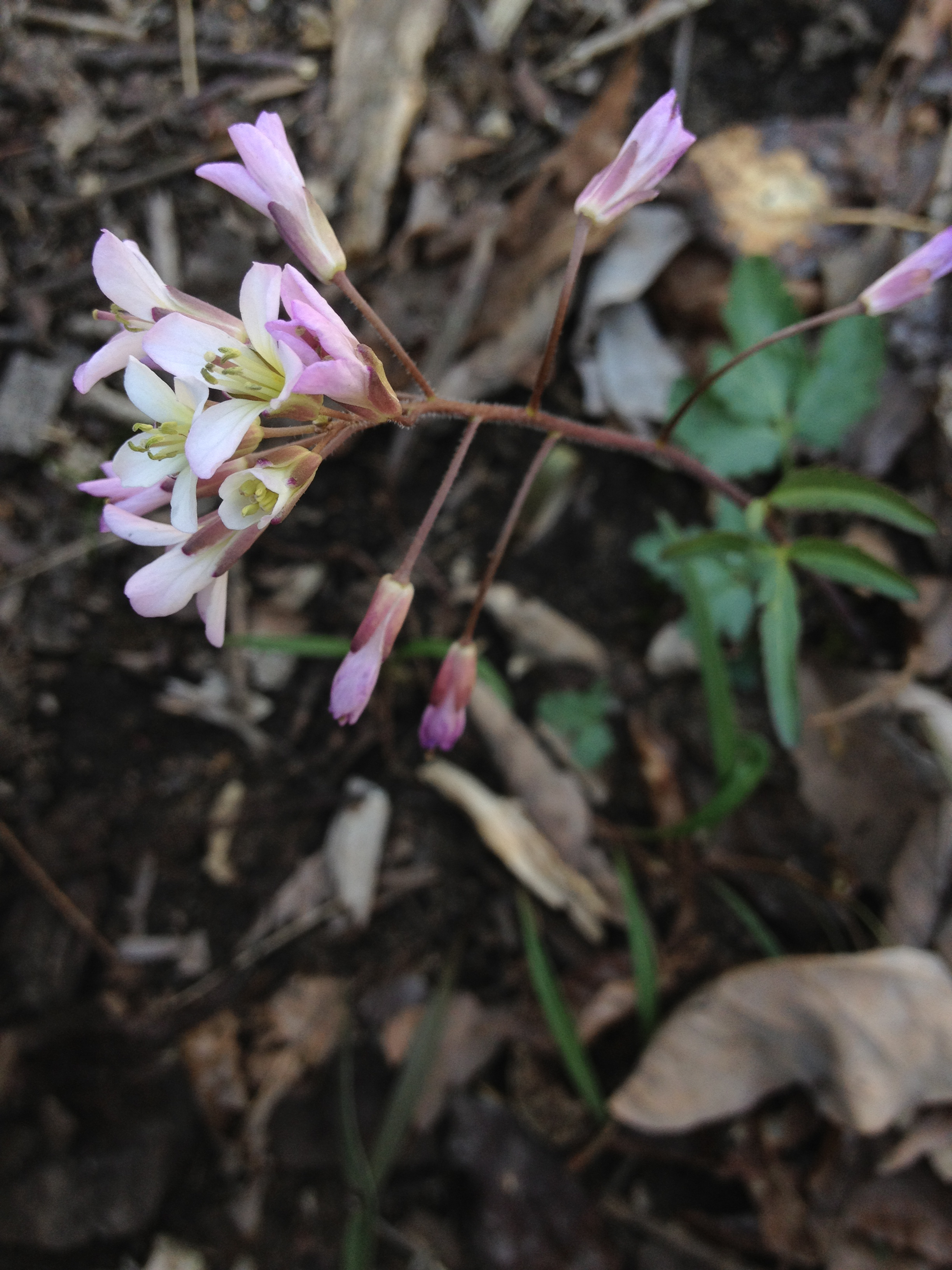

Conservation status
- Secure (NatureServe)

Scientific classification
- Kingdom: Plantae
- Clade: Tracheophytes
- Clade: Angiosperms
- Clade: Eudicots
- Clade: Rosids
- Order: Brassicales
- Family: Brassicaceae
- Genus: Cardamine
- Species: C. angustata

Binomial name
- Cardamine angustata O.E.Schulz

Synonyms
- Homotypic synonyms: Cardamine heterophylla (Nutt.) Alph.Wood; Dentaria heterophylla Nutt.; Heterotypic synonyms: Cardamine angustata var. ouachitana E.B.Sm.; Cardamine angustata f. parviflora O.E.Schulz

= Cardamine angustata =

Species of flowering plant

Cardamine angustata (known by the common name slender toothwort) is a perennial forb native to the eastern United States, that produces white to pink or purple flowers in early spring.

== Description ==
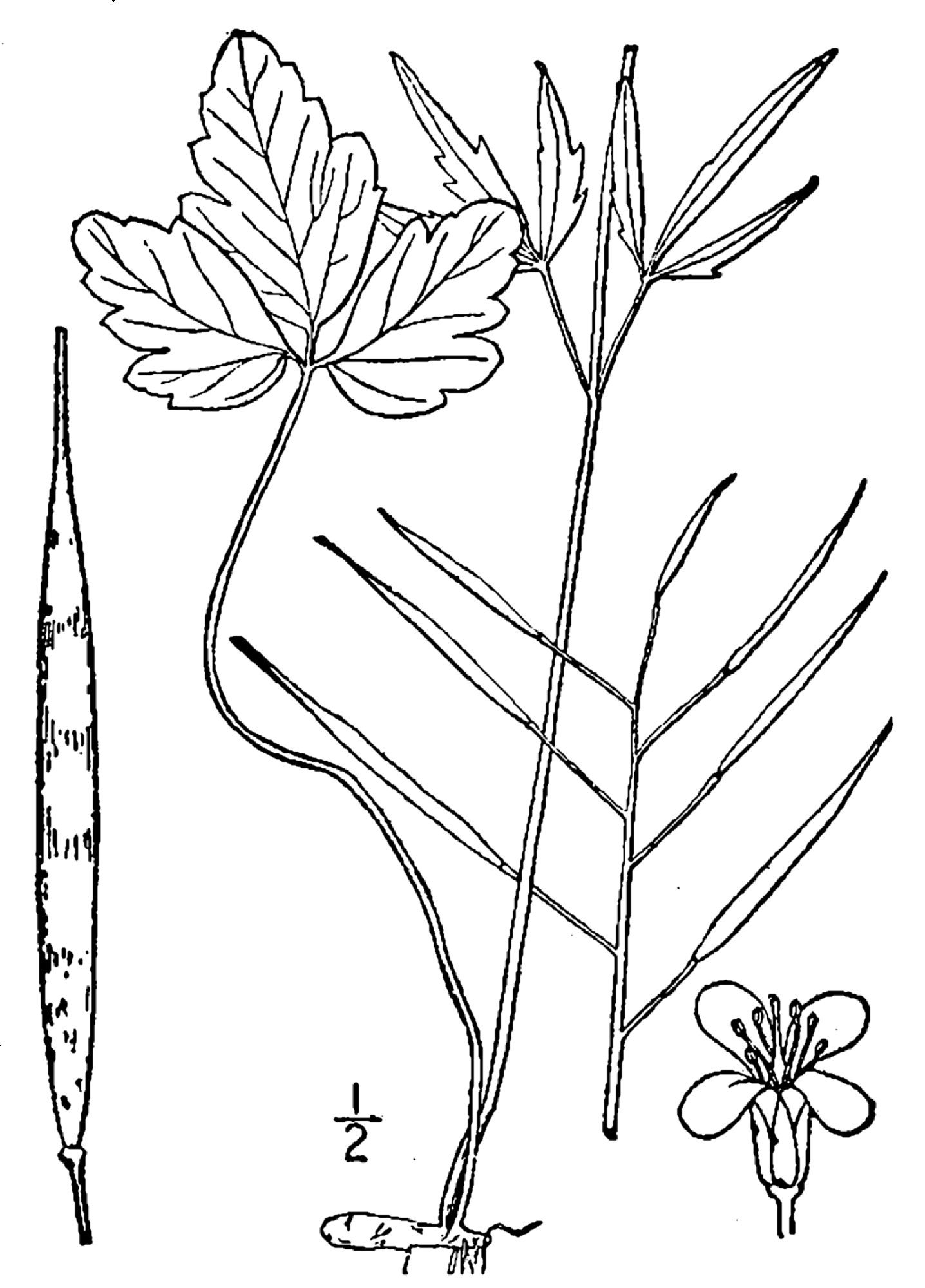
Botanical illustration of Cardamine angustata (1913)

Cardamine angustata has basal leaves which can be as large as 24 centimeters, consisting of three leaflets borne on a 3 to 16 centimeter long petiole. The erect unbranched stem is 12 to 30 centimeters tall, and can be smooth or pubescent. There are two or three leaves on the stem, which are different in morphology from the basal leaves, they are also divided into three leaflets, but these are only 2 to 7 centimeters long and 3 to 6 millimeters wide. The flowers are borne in a raceme. The petals are 9 to 18 millimeters long and 2 to 5 millimeters wide. The fruit is linear, 2.5 to 4 centimeters long and 1.5 to 2.5 millimeters wide.

== Taxonomy ==
Cardamine angustata was first described as Dentaria heterophylla by the English botanist Thomas Nuttall in 1818. The American botanist Alphonso Wood placed Dentaria heterophylla Nutt. in genus Cardamine in 1870. However, in 1903 the German botanist Otto Eugen Schulz declared the name Cardamine heterophylla (Nutt.) Alph.Wood to be illegitimate since the binomial name Cardamine heterophylla had already been in use prior to 1870. To correct the error, Schulz proposed the specific epithet angustata in lieu of heterophylla. The resulting name Cardamine angustata O.E.Schulz is widely used today.

Cardamine angustata is a member of the Cardamine concatenata alliance, a monophyletic group of eastern North American species that includes Cardamine angustata, Cardamine concatenata, Cardamine diphylla, Cardamine dissecta, Cardamine incisa, and Cardamine maxima. All members of the alliance were previously placed in genus Dentaria Tourn. ex L., which is now considered to be a synonym for Cardamine L.

== Distribution and habitat ==
Cardamine angustata is widely distributed in the eastern United States, although local distribution may be spotty. It has been recorded in Alabama, Arkansas, Washington, D.C., Delaware, Georgia, Indiana, Kentucky, Maryland, Mississippi, North Carolina, New Jersey, Ohio, Oklahoma, Pennsylvania, South Carolina, Tennessee, Virginia, and West Virginia. In Virginia, it grows in habitats such as well-drained floodplain forests and mesic to dry-mesic upland forests. The presence of this species is dependent on the appropriate habitat, and it may be eliminated from an area by development, changes in land use, or competition with invasive species.

== Conservation ==
The global conservation status of Cardamine angustata is secure (G5).

== Bibliography ==
- Weakley, Alan S.; Southeastern Flora Team (2022). "Flora of the southeastern United States". University of North Carolina Herbarium, North Carolina Botanical Garden.
- Wood, Alphonso (1889) [First edition 1870]. Willis, Oliver R. (ed.). The New American Botanist and Florist (Revised 8th ed.). New York and Chicago: A. S. Barnes & Company.
