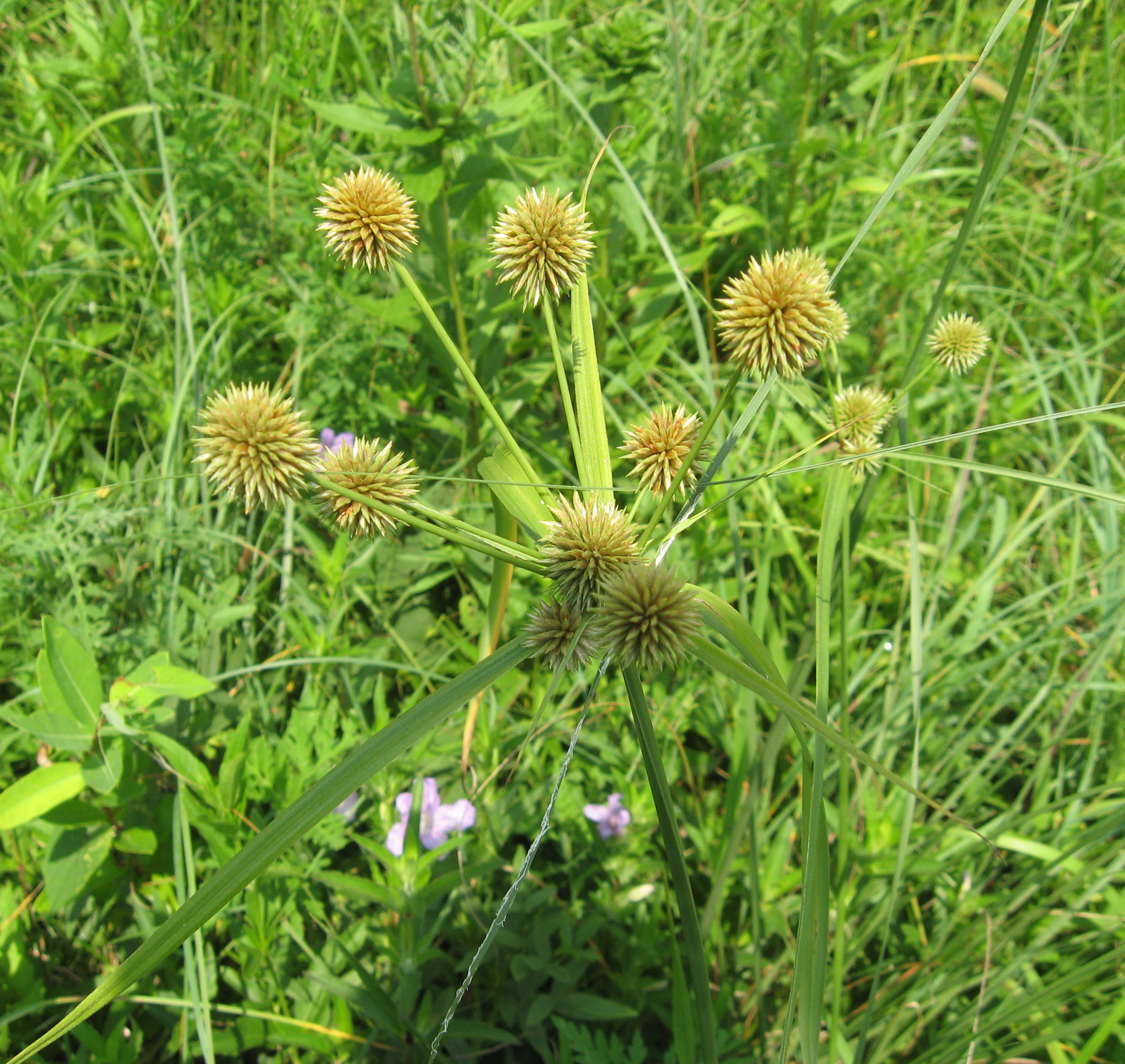

Conservation status
- Secure (NatureServe)

Scientific classification
- Kingdom: Plantae
- Clade: Tracheophytes
- Clade: Angiosperms
- Clade: Monocots
- Clade: Commelinids
- Order: Poales
- Family: Cyperaceae
- Genus: Cyperus
- Species: C. echinatus

Binomial name
- Cyperus echinatus (L.) Alph.Wood

Synonyms
- Scirpus echinatus L.

= Cyperus echinatus =

Species of plant

Cyperus echinatus, commonly called globe flatsedge, is a species of plant in the sedge family. It is native to much of the eastern United States, primarily in the lower Mississippi Valley and the lowland plain east of the southern Appalachians, with scattered populations in Florida and as far north as Wisconsin and the Adirondacks. Additional isolated populations occur in southern Mexico. It is found in a variety of sunny, often mesic habitats.

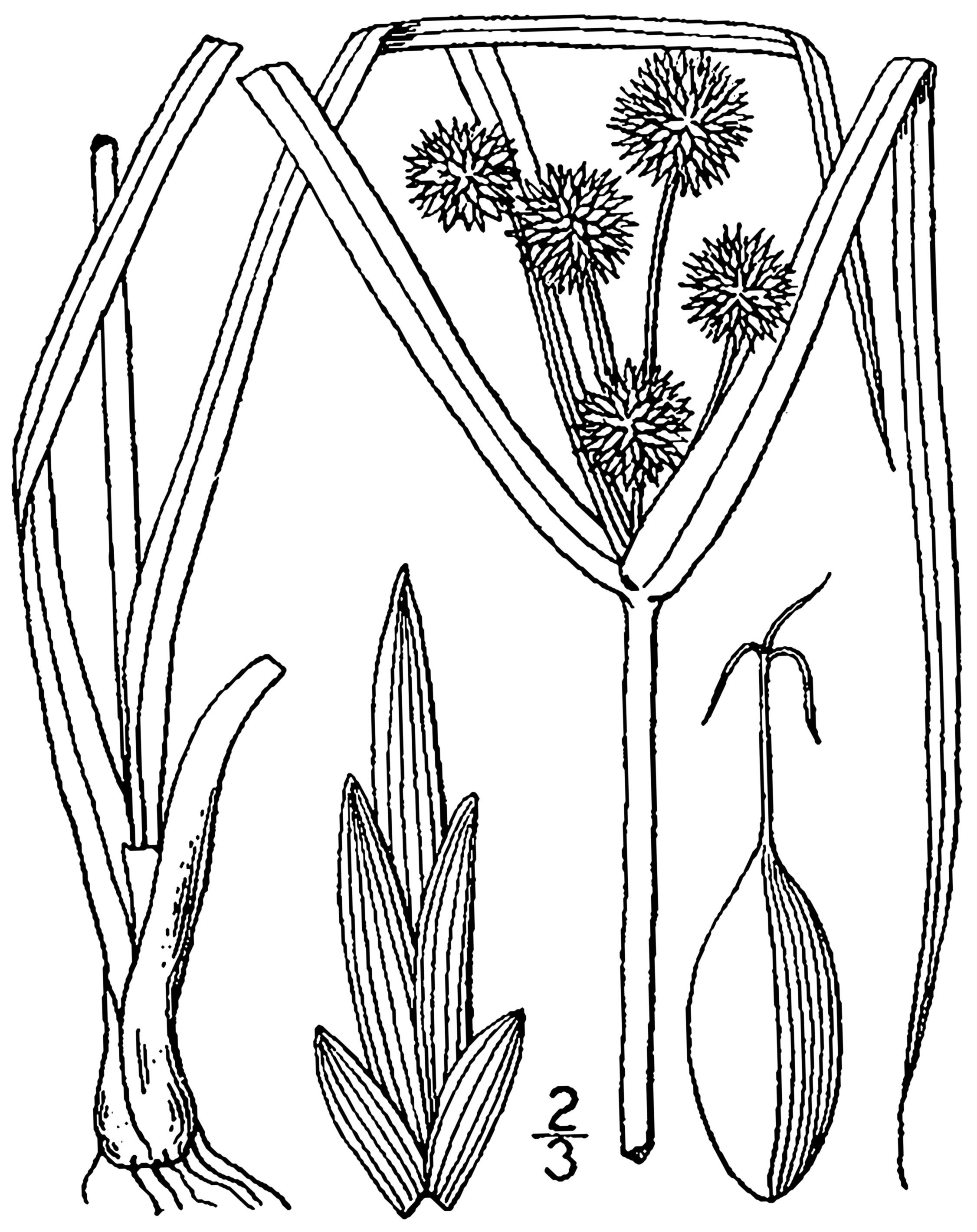
1913 drawing Britton, N.L., and A. Brown. 1913. An illustrated flora of the northern United States, Canada and the British Possessions. 3 vols. Charles Scribner's Sons, New York.

== See also ==
- List of Cyperus species
