= Cardamine barbaraeoides =

Scientific classification
- Kingdom: Plantae
- Clade: Tracheophytes
- Clade: Angiosperms
- Clade: Eudicots
- Clade: Rosids
- Order: Brassicales
- Family: Brassicaceae
- Genus: Cardamine
- Species: C. barbaraeoides

Binomial name
- Cardamine barbaraeoides Halácsy

Species of plant

Cardamine barbaraeoides is a perennial herbaceous plant in the Brassicaceae (mustard) family that is stenoendemic to the Southern Pindos mountains in Greece.

== Description ==
The distribution of Cardamine barbaraeoides is restricted to the northern part of the Southern Pindos mountains and the southern part of the Northern Pindos mountains. C. barbaraeoidies grows in wetter soil, commonly growing along small streams, stream banks, wet rock faces, and in springs on wet meadows or pastures. At elevations between 1,000 and 1,800 meters above sea level. It is a perennial and grows primarily in the temperate biome. C. barbaraeoides has a petal color that is white with violet anthers; the overall inflorescence is racemose. The stigma is inconspicuous absent basal leaves and is as wide as the style. The basal leaf rosette is glabrous, pinnate, with 1–2 leaflets, and is loosely congested near the glabrous stem base. 9–21 Stem leaves are equally distributed on the stem, are pinnate, and are similar to basal leaves

Cardamine barbaraeoides is a tetraploid with 32 chromosomes. Analysis of sequencing suggests and allopolyploid origin with its progenitors being derived from two major clades of diploids C. amara and C. acris. A second possible scenario is that wide-ranging genomic changes in the polypoid in response to a "genomic shock", including nonhomologous recombination, significantly transformed and differentiated the polypoid genome from its diploid progenitors.
