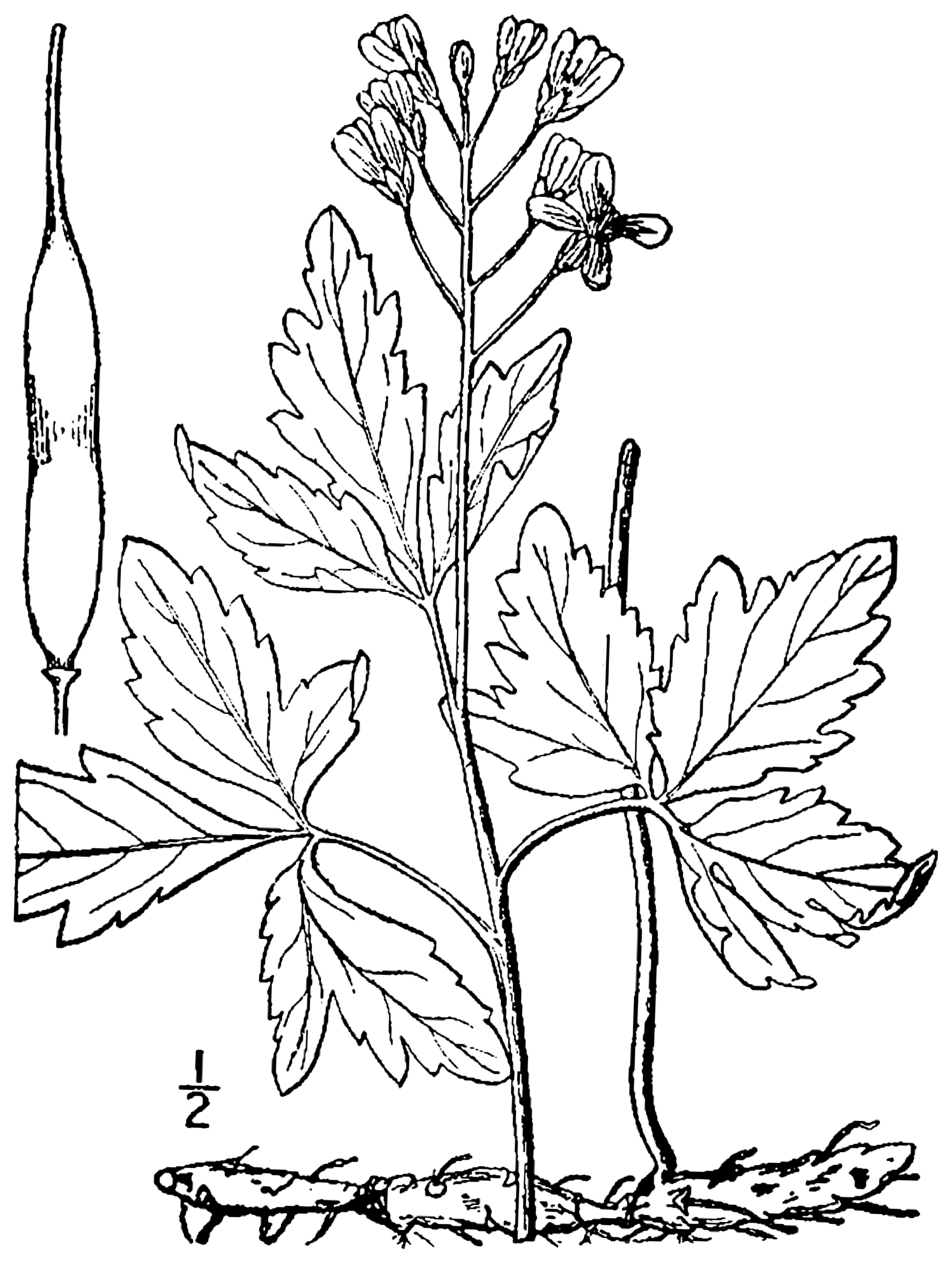

Conservation status
- Secure (NatureServe)

Scientific classification
- Kingdom: Plantae
- Clade: Tracheophytes
- Clade: Angiosperms
- Clade: Eudicots
- Clade: Rosids
- Order: Brassicales
- Family: Brassicaceae
- Genus: Cardamine
- Species: C. maxima

Binomial name
- Cardamine maxima (Nutt.) Alph.Wood

Synonyms
- Homotypic Synonyms: Dentaria maxima Nutt.; Heterotypic Synonyms: Cardamine × anomala (Eames) K.Schum.; Dentaria anomala Eames; Dentaria maxima f. albiflora Louis-Marie; Dentaria maxima f. aphylla Louis-Marie

= Cardamine maxima =

Species of flowering plant

Cardamine maxima is a species of flowering plant in the mustard family Brassicaceae.

== Taxonomy ==
Cardamine maxima was first described as Dentaria maxima by the English botanist Thomas Nuttall in 1818. The American botanist Alphonso Wood placed Dentaria maxima Nutt. in genus Cardamine in 1870. The name Cardamine maxima (Nutt.) Alph.Wood is widely used today.

Cardamine maxima is a member of the Cardamine concatenata alliance, a monophyletic group of eastern North American species that includes Cardamine angustata, Cardamine concatenata, Cardamine diphylla, Cardamine dissecta, Cardamine incisa, and Cardamine maxima. All members of the alliance were previously placed in genus Dentaria Tourn. ex L., which is now considered to be a synonym for Cardamine L.

== Distribution and habitat ==
Cardamine maxima is native to eastern North America. Its range extends north to New Brunswick and Québec, south to Pennsylvania and New Jersey, and west to Ontario and Wisconsin. It is known to occur in the following provinces and states:

- Canada: New Brunswick, Ontario, Québec
- United States: Connecticut, Maine, Massachusetts, Michigan, New Jersey, New York, Ohio, Pennsylvania, Vermont, Wisconsin

In the United States, its distribution is centered in New York and western New England (Connecticut, Massachusetts, Vermont).

== Conservation ==
The global conservation status of Cardamine maxima is secure (G5). However, outside of New York (its center of distribution) it is uncommon (S3) at best.

== Bibliography ==
- Gilman, Arthur V. (2015). New Flora of Vermont. Memoirs of The New York Botanical Garden, Volume 110. Bronx, New York, USA: The New York Botanical Garden Press. ISBN 978-0-89327-516-7.
- Haines, Arthur (2011). New England Wild Flower Society's Flora Novae Angliae: A Manual for the Identification of Native and Naturalized Higher Vascular Plants of New England. Illustrated by Elizabeth Farnsworth and Gordon Morrison. Yale University Press. ISBN 978-0-300-17154-9.
- Weakley, Alan S.; Southeastern Flora Team (2022). "Flora of the southeastern United States". University of North Carolina Herbarium, North Carolina Botanical Garden.
- Wood, Alphonso (1889) [First edition 1870]. Willis, Oliver R. (ed.). The New American Botanist and Florist (Revised 8th ed.). New York and Chicago: A. S. Barnes & Company.
