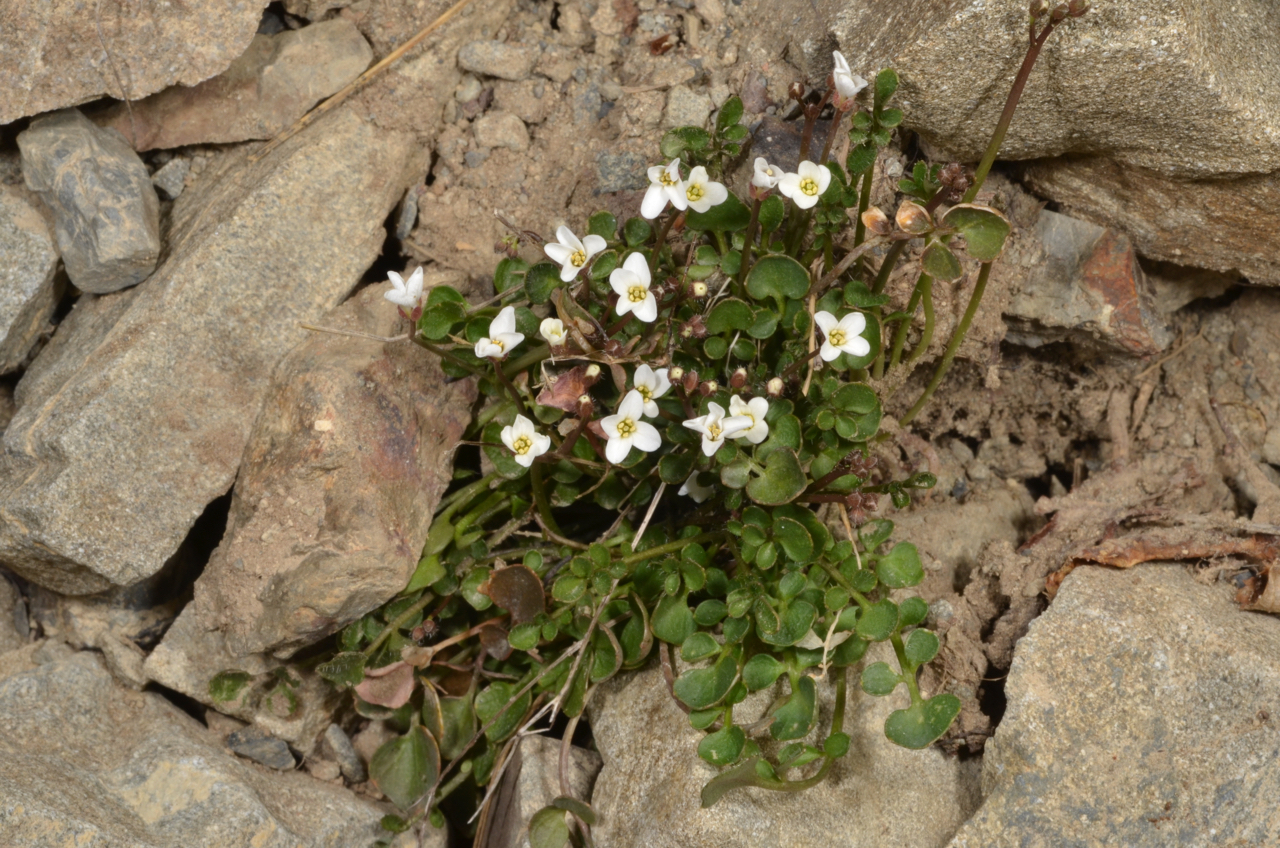
- Cardamine glara seen near Mount Cockayne in the South Island

Scientific classification
- Kingdom: Plantae
- Clade: Tracheophytes
- Clade: Angiosperms
- Clade: Eudicots
- Clade: Rosids
- Order: Brassicales
- Family: Brassicaceae
- Genus: Cardamine
- Species: C. glara

Binomial name
- Cardamine glara Heenan

= Cardamine glara =

Species of plant

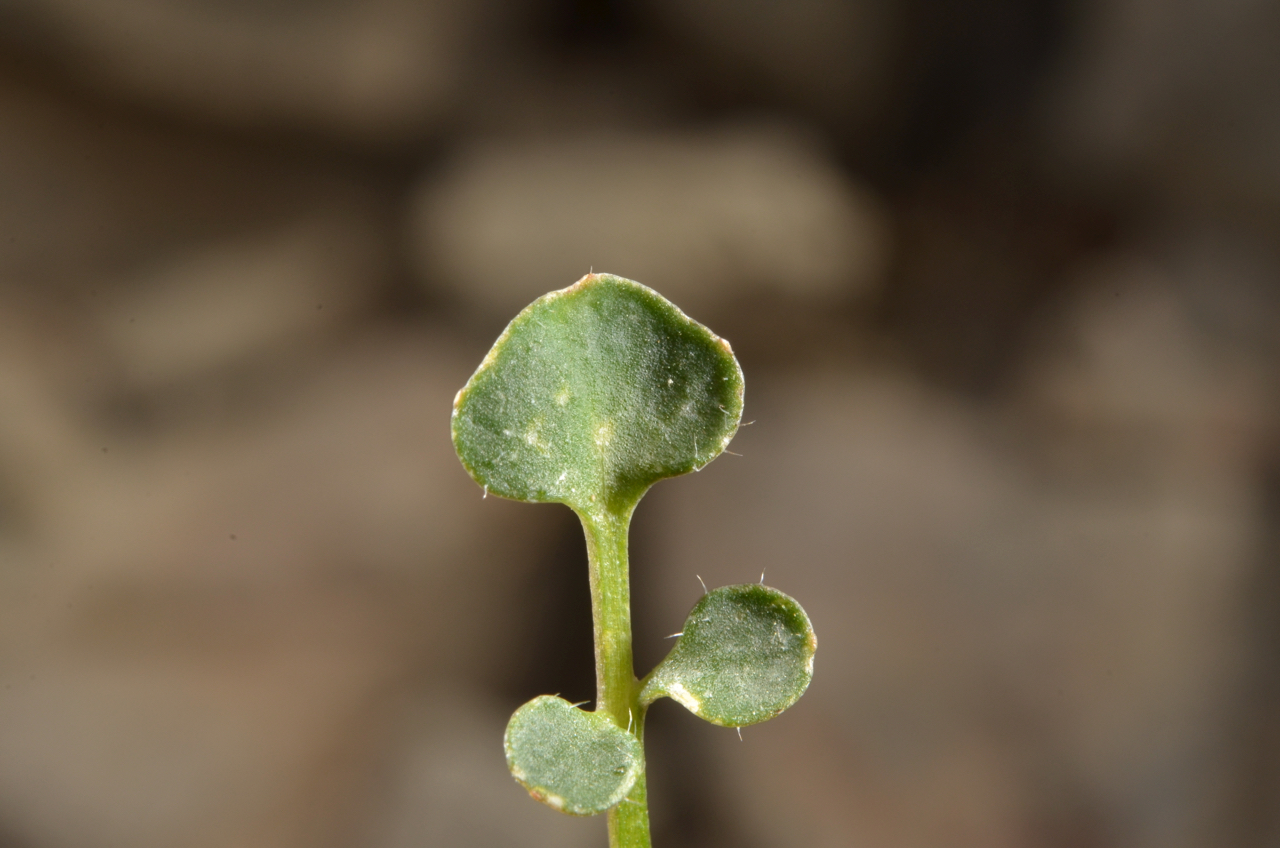
Close-up of Cardamine glara leaves

Cardamine glara is a species of flowering plant in the family Brassicaceae, native to New Zealand. A rhizomatous perennial herb, its specific epithet refers to the scree that it is often found growing in.
