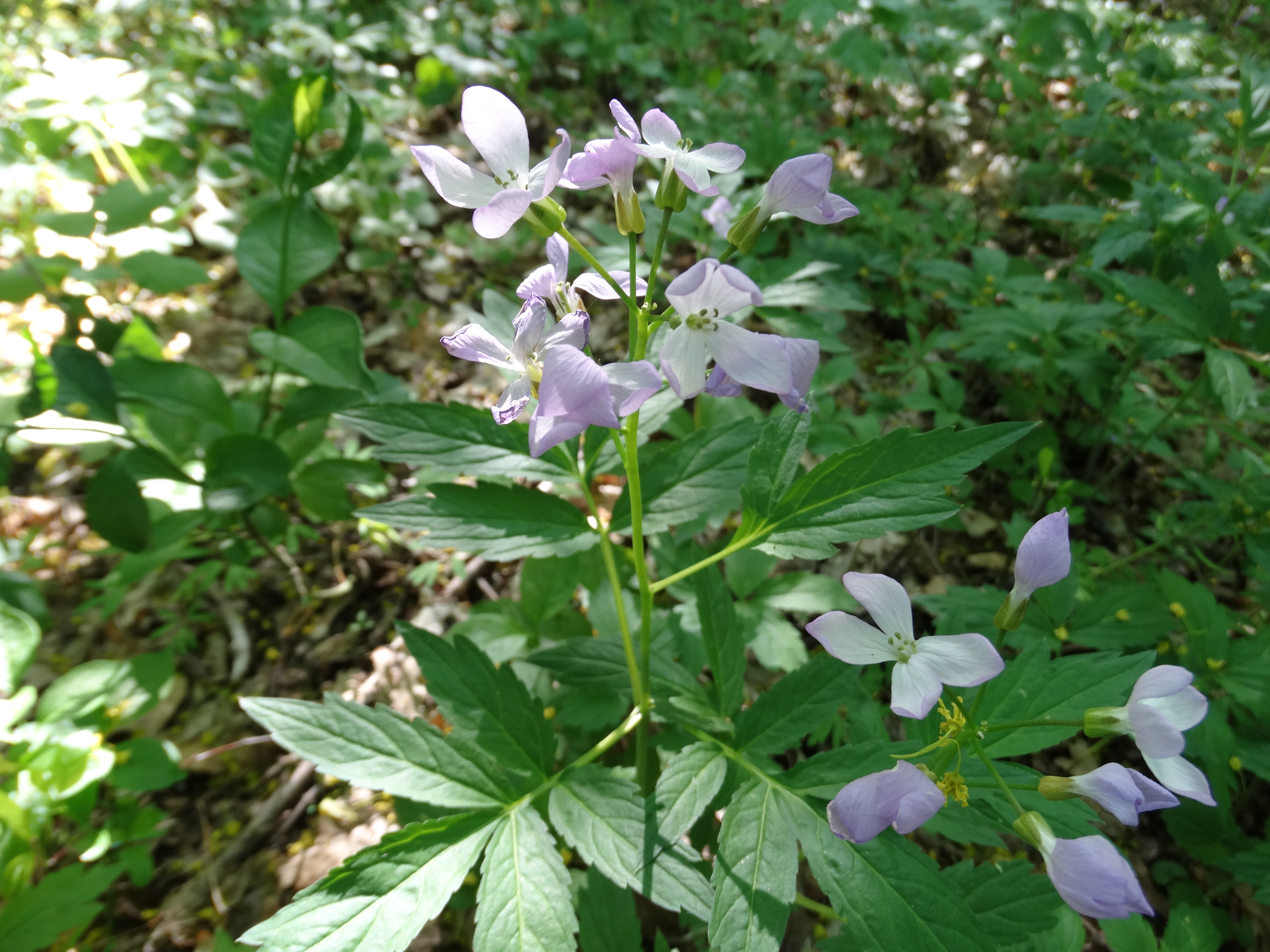

Scientific classification
- Kingdom: Plantae
- Clade: Tracheophytes
- Clade: Angiosperms
- Clade: Eudicots
- Clade: Rosids
- Order: Brassicales
- Family: Brassicaceae
- Genus: Cardamine
- Species: C. quinquefolia

Binomial name
- Cardamine quinquefolia (M.Bieb.) Schmalh.

= Cardamine quinquefolia =

Species of flowering plant

Cardamine quinquefolia, the five-leaved cuckoo flower or whorled coral-root, is a species of flowering plant in the family Brassicaceae, native to an area from south eastern Europe to northern Iran.

Growing to 30 cm (12 in) tall and 100 cm (39 in) broad, this spreading herbaceous perennial produces masses of violet coloured flowers in spring. The Latin specific epithet quinquefolia means "with five-lobed leaves". The whole plant dies down in summer.

This plant is used as groundcover in gardens. It has received the Royal Horticultural Society's Award of Garden Merit. It prefers a sheltered spot in full or partial shade.
