= Cardamine griffithii =

Scientific classification
- Kingdom: Plantae
- Clade: Tracheophytes
- Clade: Angiosperms
- Clade: Eudicots
- Clade: Rosids
- Order: Brassicales
- Family: Brassicaceae
- Genus: Cardamine
- Species: C. griffithii

Binomial name
- Cardamine griffithii Hook.f. & Thomson

Species of plant

Cardamine griffithii is a species of herb characterized by angled or grooved stems that are sparsely branched above and can reach heights of up to 60 cm. The plant is glabrous, meaning it lacks hair or trichomes.

== Description ==
The leaves of Cardamine griffithii are 2–9 cm long. The lateral leaflets are arranged in 3-6 pairs and are sessile or subsessile. They are orbicular or ovate in shape, with a rounded base. The leaflets have entire margins or are irregularly sinuate along the edges. They measure 3–10 mm in length and 2–8 mm in width. The lowest pair of leaflets is auriculate, meaning it has ear-like lobes. The terminal leaflet is suborbicular and can reach a diameter of up to 1.3 cm.

The plant produces few-flowered racemes that are somewhat crowded at the apex. The flowers of Cardamine griffithii are lilac or purple and approximately 6 mm in diameter. The sepals are oblong-elliptic and have an obtuse apex. They measure around 3 mm in length and 2 mm in width. The petals are obovate and range in size from 4–10 mm in length and 3–5 mm in width. They can be either white or purplish in color.

Cardamine griffithii has six stamens, with the four inner ones being larger and measuring around 6 mm in length. The two outer stamens are smaller. The plant produces pods that are 10–15 mm long.

This species flowers and fruits from May to July.

== Habitat and distribution ==
It is primarily found in India, specifically in streamsides and along shady places at elevations ranging from 2000 to 4000 m. Cardamine griffithii is also distributed in Nepal, Bhutan, and China.
