= Cardamine carrii =

Scientific classification
- Kingdom: Plantae
- Clade: Tracheophytes
- Clade: Angiosperms
- Clade: Eudicots
- Clade: Rosids
- Order: Brassicales
- Family: Brassicaceae
- Genus: Cardamine
- Species: C. carrii

Binomial name
- Cardamine carrii B.L.Turner

Species of plant

Cardamine carrii, or Carr's bittercress, is a flowering plant in the family Brassicaceae. It is native to the US state of Texas. It is an annual herb, growing up to 8 inches (20 centimetres) tall.
