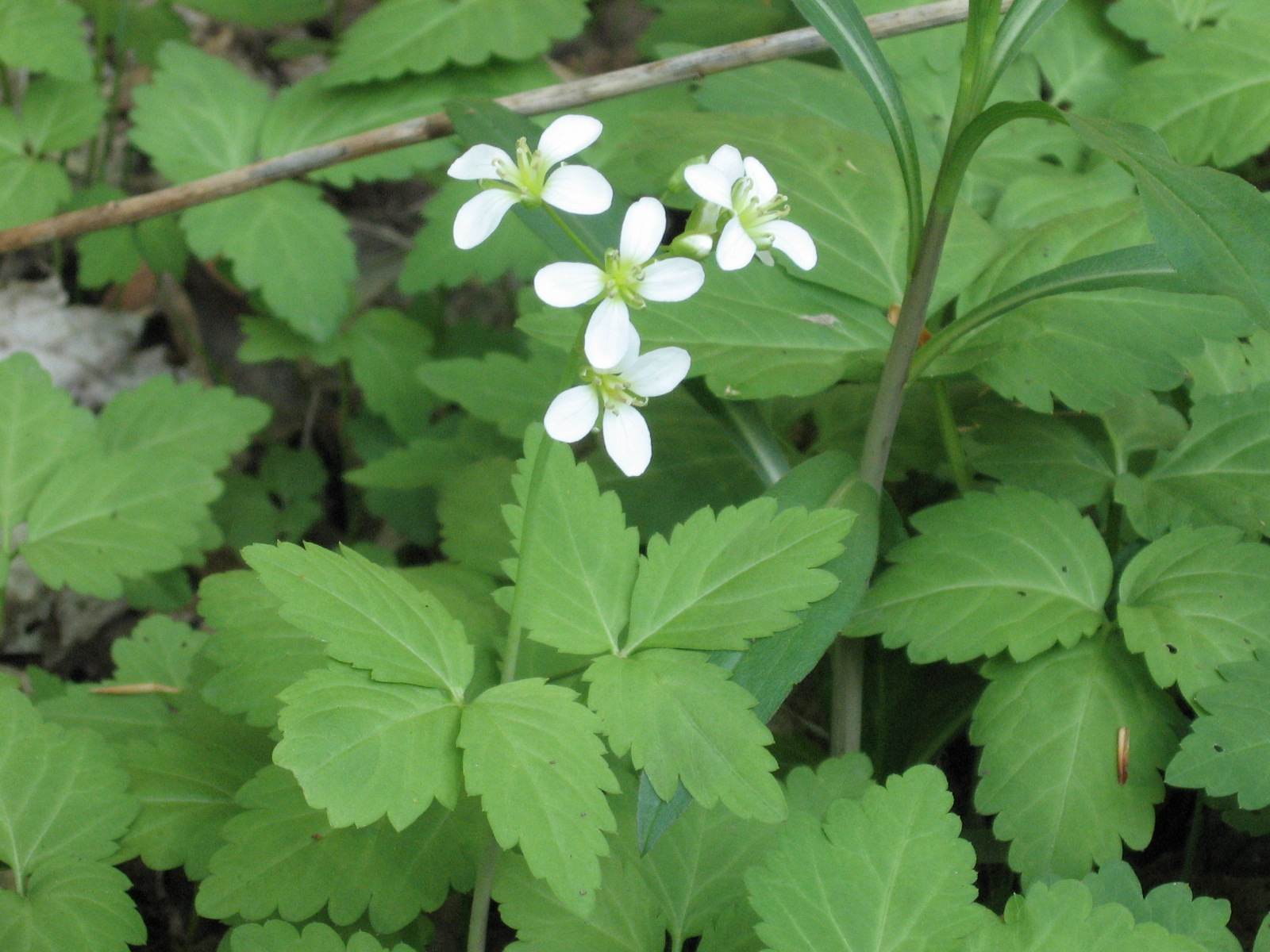

Conservation status
- Secure (NatureServe)

Scientific classification
- Kingdom: Plantae
- Clade: Tracheophytes
- Clade: Angiosperms
- Clade: Eudicots
- Clade: Rosids
- Order: Brassicales
- Family: Brassicaceae
- Genus: Cardamine
- Species: C. diphylla

Binomial name
- Cardamine diphylla (Michx.) Alph.Wood

Synonyms
- Homotypic Synonyms: Dentaria diphylla Michx.; Heterotypic Synonyms: Dentaria bifolia Stokes; Dentaria incisa Small

= Cardamine diphylla =

Species of flowering plant in the cabbage family

Cardamine diphylla (broadleaf toothwort, crinkle root, crinkle-root, crinkleroot, pepper root, twin-leaved toothwort, twoleaf toothwort, toothwort) is a flowering plant in the family Brassicaceae. It is a spring flowering woodland plant that is native to eastern North America.

== Description ==
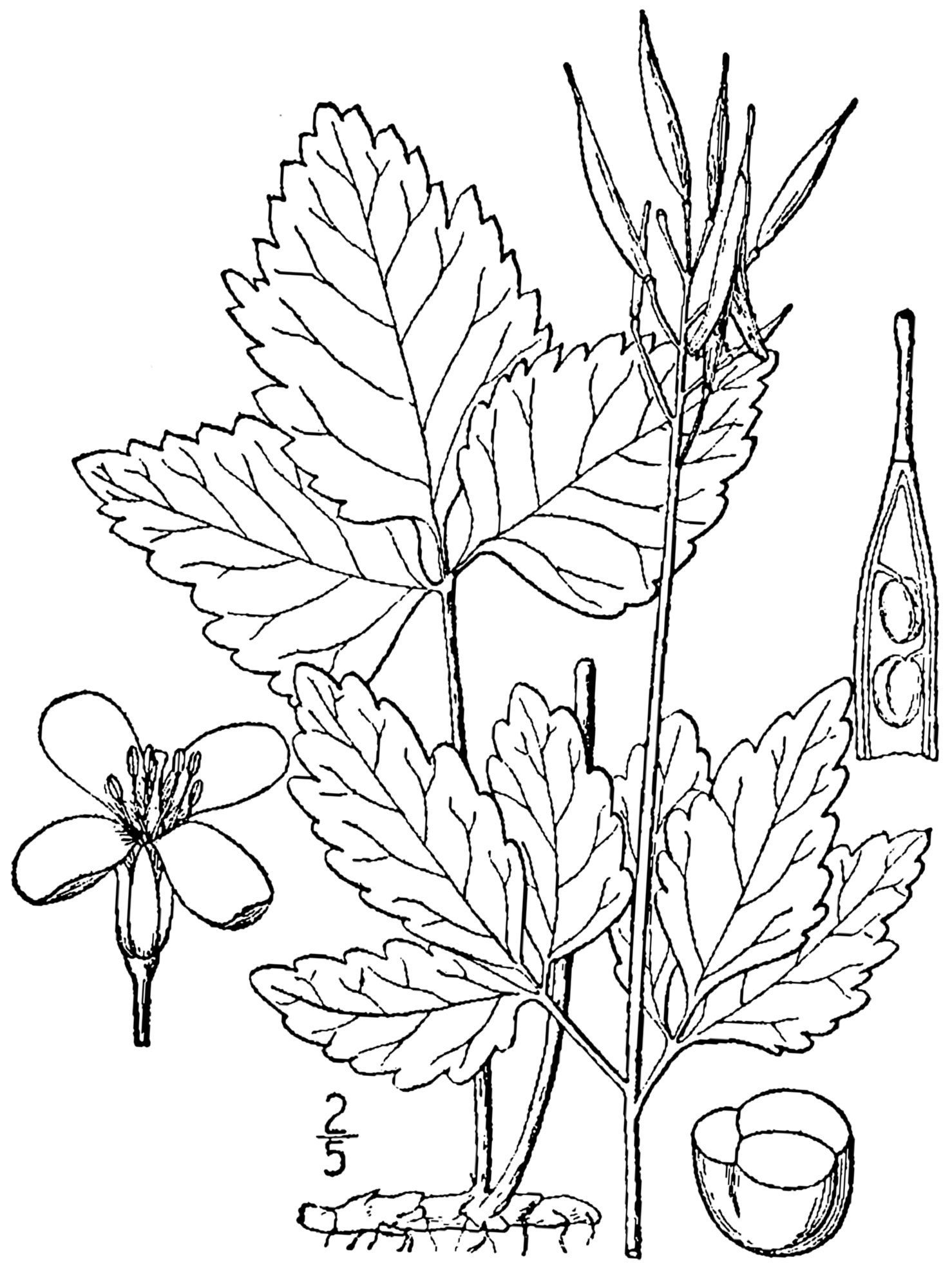
Botanical illustration of Cardamine diphylla (1913)

A member of the mustard family, it is typified by a four petal flower which blooms in a cluster on a single stalk above a single pair of toothed stem leaves each divided into three broad leaflets. After flowering, narrow seedpods appear just below the flower cluster. It grows approximately 30 cm (12 in) tall.

== Taxonomy ==
Cardamine diphylla was first described as Dentaria diphylla by the French botanist André Michaux in 1803. The American botanist Alphonso Wood placed Dentaria diphylla Michx. in genus Cardamine in 1870. The name Cardamine diphylla (Michx.) Alph.Wood is widely used today.

Cardamine diphylla is a member of the Cardamine concatenata alliance, a monophyletic group of eastern North American species that includes Cardamine angustata, Cardamine concatenata, Cardamine diphylla, Cardamine dissecta, Cardamine incisa, and Cardamine maxima. All members of the alliance were previously placed in genus Dentaria Tourn. ex L., which is now considered to be a synonym for Cardamine L.

== Distribution and habitat ==
Cardamine diphylla is native to eastern North America. Its wide range extends north to Québec and Nova Scotia, south to Georgia and Alabama, and west to Wisconsin. It is known to occur in the following provinces and states:

- Canada: New Brunswick, Nova Scotia, Ontario, Québec
- United States: Alabama, Arkansas, Connecticut, Georgia, Indiana, Kentucky, Maine, Maryland, Massachusetts, Michigan, Minnesota, New Hampshire, New Jersey, New York, North Carolina, Ohio, Pennsylvania, South Carolina, Tennessee, Vermont, Virginia, West Virginia, Wisconsin

Its distribution is centered in the Great Lakes region of North America. It is found in moist woodlands usually in edge habitats and blooms from April to June.

== Ecology ==
The West Virginia white butterfly (Pieris virginiensis) lays its eggs on this plant as well as C. laciniata. The larvae also feed on this plant. As with Pieris oleracea, Pieris virginiensis mistakes garlic mustard for its host plants, making eradication of it important for their continued survival. Garlic mustard also competes with the plants for space and nutrients.

== Conservation ==
The global conservation status of Cardamine diphylla is secure (G5).

== Uses ==
=== Medicinal ===
The ground root is mixed with vinegar by the Algonquin people of Quebec and used as a relish. They also give an infusion to children to treat fevers, and use an infusion of the plant and sweet flag root to treat heart disease. The Cherokee use a poultice of the root for headaches, chew the root for colds and gargle an infusion for sore throats. The Lenape use the roots as a stomach medicine, and use an infusion of the roots combined with other plants as a treatment for scrofula and venereal disease. The Delaware Nation of Oklahoma use a compound containing the root as a stomach remedy, for scrofula, and for venereal disease.

The Haudenosaunee take an infusion of the whole plant to strengthen the breasts. They also chew the raw root for stomach gas, apply a poultice of roots to swellings, take a cold infusion of the plant for fever and for "summer complaint, drink a cold infusion of the roots for "when love is too strong", and use an infusion of the roots when "heart jumps and the head goes wrong." They also use a compound for chest pains. They also take an infusion of the plant at the beginning of tuberculosis. The Malecite use an infusion of the roots as a tonic, and chew green or dried roots for hoarseness. The Mi'kmaq use the root as a sedative, to clear the throat and for hoarseness, and use the root as a tonic.

=== Culinary ===
The Abenaki use it as a condiment. The Cherokee parboil and rinse the stems and leaves, add hot grease, salt and water, and boiled them until they are soft as potherbs. They also use the leaves in salads, and smoke the plant. The Haudenosaunee eat the roots raw with salt or boiled. The Ojibwa mix the roots with salt, vinegar, or sugar and use them as a condiment.

== Bibliography ==
- Gilman, Arthur V. (2015). New Flora of Vermont. Memoirs of The New York Botanical Garden, Volume 110. Bronx, New York, USA: The New York Botanical Garden Press. ISBN 978-0-89327-516-7.
- Haines, Arthur (2011). New England Wild Flower Society's Flora Novae Angliae: A Manual for the Identification of Native and Naturalized Higher Vascular Plants of New England. Illustrated by Elizabeth Farnsworth and Gordon Morrison. Yale University Press. ISBN 978-0-300-17154-9.
- Michaux, André (March 1803). Flora Boreali-Americana. Vol. 2. Paris and Strasbourg.
- Weakley, Alan S.; Southeastern Flora Team (2022). "Flora of the southeastern United States". University of North Carolina Herbarium, North Carolina Botanical Garden.
- Wood, Alphonso (1889) [First edition 1870]. Willis, Oliver R. (ed.). The New American Botanist and Florist (Revised 8th ed.). New York and Chicago: A. S. Barnes & Company.
