= Cardamine lilacina =

Lilac bitter-cress

Scientific classification
- Kingdom: Plantae
- Clade: Tracheophytes
- Clade: Angiosperms
- Clade: Eudicots
- Clade: Rosids
- Order: Brassicales
- Family: Brassicaceae
- Genus: Cardamine
- Species: C. lilacina

Binomial name
- Cardamine lilacina Hook.

Species of flowering plant

Cardamine lilacina, commonly known as the lilac bitter-cress, is a herbaceous plant native to Australia.
