= Cardamine incisa =

Scientific classification
- Kingdom: Plantae
- Clade: Tracheophytes
- Clade: Angiosperms
- Clade: Eudicots
- Clade: Rosids
- Order: Brassicales
- Family: Brassicaceae
- Genus: Cardamine
- Species: C. incisa

Binomial name
- Cardamine incisa K.Schum.

Synonyms
- Homotypic synonyms: Dentaria incisa Eames; Dentaria incisifolia Eames ex Britton

Species of flowering plant

Cardamine incisa is a species of flowering plant in the mustard family Brassicaceae.

== Taxonomy ==
Cardamine incisa was first described as Dentaria incisa by Edwin Hubert Eames in 1903. However, the name Dentaria incisa Eames is an illegitimate name since the binomial name Dentaria incisa was already in use at the time Eames published his description. The American botanist Nathaniel Lord Britton corrected this oversight by describing Dentaria incisifolia Eames ex Britton in 1905, but by that time, a valid description for Cardamine incisa had already been provided by the German botanist Karl Moritz Schumann in 1904. Therefore, the correct name for this taxon is Cardamine incisa K.Schum., while the other two names are synonyms. In recognition of Eames' contribution, the taxon is sometimes referred to as Eames' toothwort.

Cardamine incisa is a member of the Cardamine concatenata alliance, a monophyletic group of eastern North American species that includes Cardamine angustata, Cardamine concatenata, Cardamine diphylla, Cardamine dissecta, Cardamine incisa, and Cardamine maxima. All members of the alliance were previously placed in genus Dentaria Tourn. ex L., which is now considered to be a synonym for Cardamine L.

Some authorities recognize the taxon corresponding to Cardamine incisa K.Schum., while others do not. In particular, Flora of North America and NatureServe do not recognize this taxon.

== Bibliography ==
- Eames, Edwin H. (September 1903). "The Dentarias of Connecticut". Rhodora. 5 (57): 213–219.
- Haines, Arthur (2011). New England Wild Flower Society's Flora Novae Angliae: A Manual for the Identification of Native and Naturalized Higher Vascular Plants of New England. Illustrated by Elizabeth Farnsworth and Gordon Morrison. Yale University Press. ISBN 978-0-300-17154-9.
