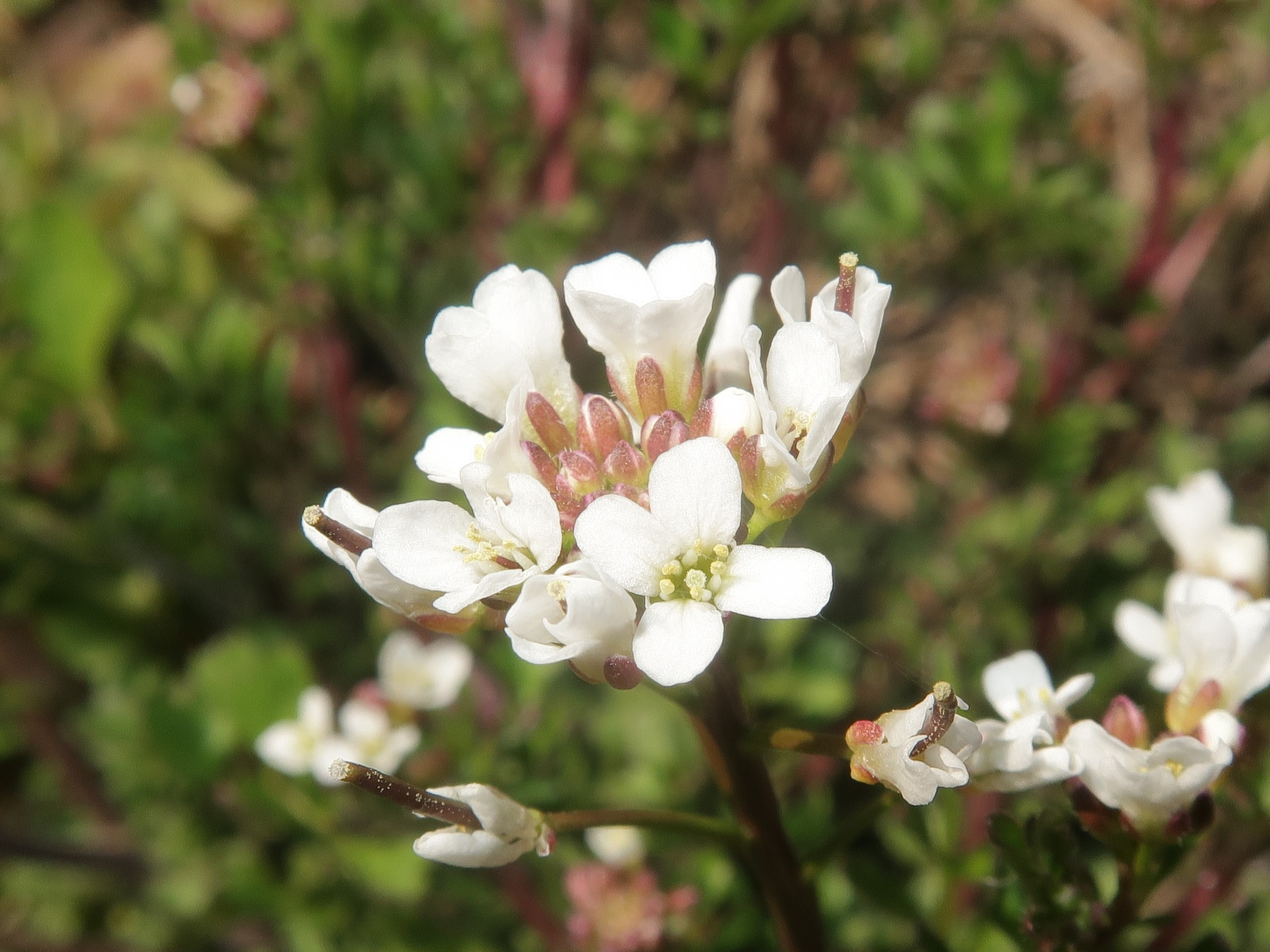
- Inflorescence
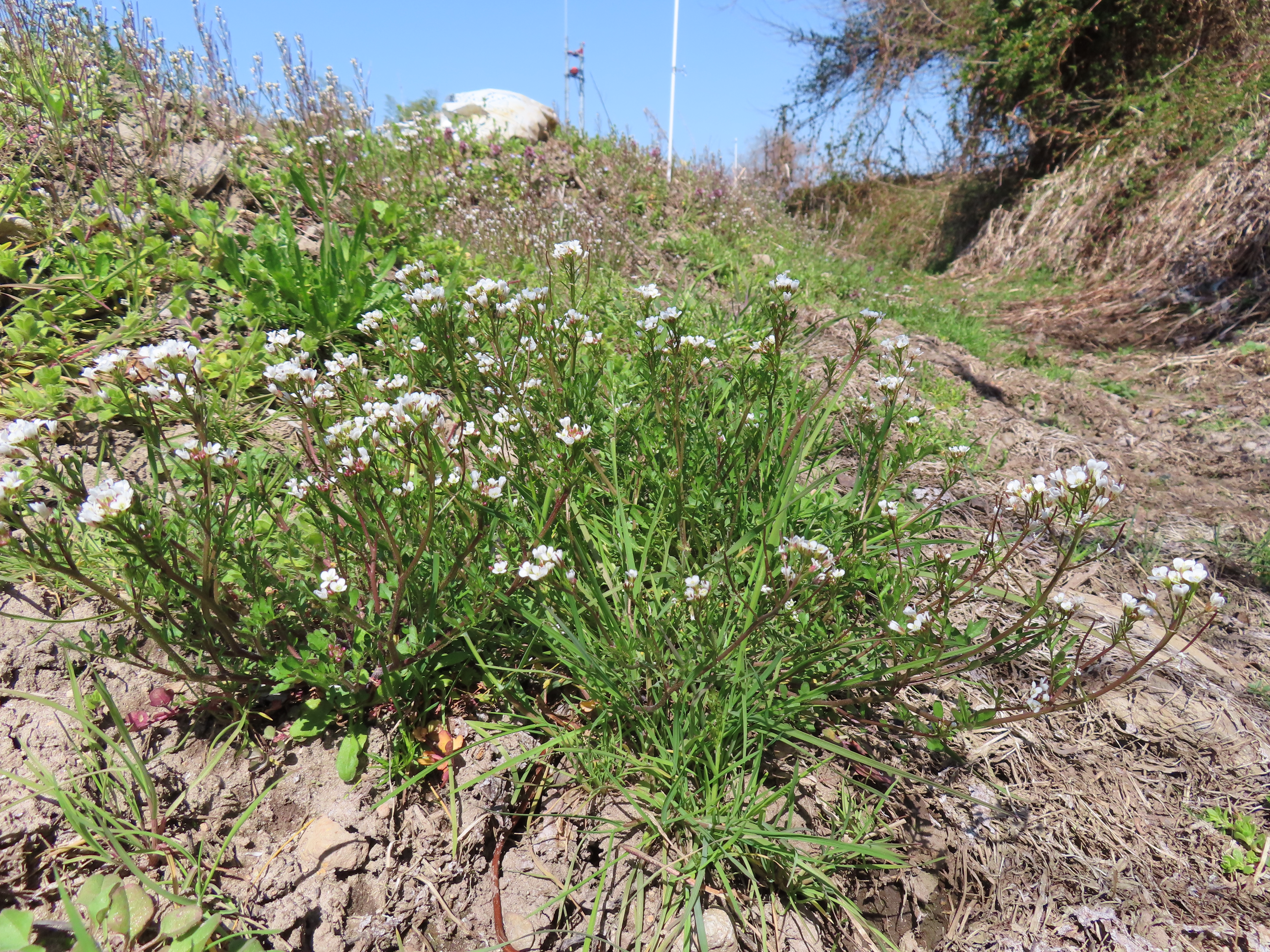
- Habit

Scientific classification
- Kingdom: Plantae
- Clade: Tracheophytes
- Clade: Angiosperms
- Clade: Eudicots
- Clade: Rosids
- Order: Brassicales
- Family: Brassicaceae
- Genus: Cardamine
- Species: C. occulta

Binomial name
- Cardamine occulta Hornem.

Synonyms
- List: Barbarea arisanensis (Hayata) S.S.Ying; Cardamine arisanensis Hayata; Cardamine autumnalis Koidz.; Cardamine brachycarpa Franch.; Cardamine debilis D.Don; Cardamine decurrens (Blume) Zoll. & Moritzi; Cardamine flexuosa subsp. debilis O.E.Schulz; Cardamine flexuosa var. debilis (O.E.Schulz) T.Y.Cheo & R.C.Fang; Cardamine flexuosa var. occulta (Hornem.) O.E.Schulz; Cardamine hamiltonii G.Don; Cardamine hirsuta var. flaccida Franch.; Cardamine nasturtioides D.Don; Pteroneurum decurrens Blume

= Cardamine occulta =

Species of plant

Cardamine occulta, the hidden bittercress, is a species of flowering plant in the family Brassicaceae, native to the Indian Subcontinent, China, Taiwan, Southeast Asia, most of Malesia, and Japan. It has been introduced many locales around the world, including most of Europe, the South Island of New Zealand, central Mexico, Costa Rica, El Salvador, Cuba, the US state of Maryland, and Newfoundland. An annual or biennial, it is typically found in ruderal situations.
