= Cardamine dissecta =

Conservation status
- Apparently Secure (NatureServe)

Scientific classification
- Kingdom: Plantae
- Clade: Tracheophytes
- Clade: Angiosperms
- Clade: Eudicots
- Clade: Rosids
- Order: Brassicales
- Family: Brassicaceae
- Genus: Cardamine
- Species: C. dissecta

Binomial name
- Cardamine dissecta (Leavenw.) Al-Shehbaz

Synonyms
- Homotypic Synonyms: Dentaria dissecta Leavenw.; Heterotypic Synonyms: Cardamine angustata var. multifida (Muhl. ex Elliott) H.E.Ahles; Cardamine laciniata var. lasiocarpa O.E.Schulz; Cardamine laciniata var. multifida (Muhl. ex Elliott) J.James; Cardamine laciniata subsp. multifida (Muhl. ex Elliott) O.E.Schulz; Cardamine multifida (Muhl. ex Elliott) Alph.Wood; Dentaria furcat Small; Dentaria heterophylla var. multifida (Muhl.) H.E.Ahles; Dentaria laciniata var. multifida (Muhl. ex Elliott) S.Watson & J.M.Coult.; Dentaria multifida Muhl. ex Elliott

Species of flowering plant

Cardamine dissecta is a species of flowering plant in the mustard family Brassicaceae.

== Taxonomy ==
Cardamine dissecta was first described as Dentaria dissecta by the American botanist Melines Conklin Leavenworth in 1824. The American botanist Ihsan Ali Al-Shehbaz placed Dentaria dissecta Leavenw. in genus Cardamine in 1988. The name Cardamine dissecta (Leavenw.) Al-Shehbaz is widely used today.

Cardamine dissecta is a member of the Cardamine concatenata alliance, a monophyletic group of eastern North American species that includes Cardamine angustata, Cardamine concatenata, Cardamine diphylla, Cardamine dissecta, Cardamine incisa, and Cardamine maxima. All members of the alliance were previously placed in genus Dentaria Tourn. ex L., which is now considered to be a synonym for Cardamine L.

== Distribution and habitat ==
Cardamine dissecta is native to eastern North America. Its range extends north to Ohio and Indiana, and south to Virginia and Alabama. It is known to occur in the following states:

- United States: Alabama, Georgia, Indiana, Kentucky, North Carolina, Ohio, Tennessee

Its distribution is centered in Kentucky, Tennessee, and Alabama.

== Conservation ==
The global conservation status of Cardamine dissecta is apparently secure (G4).

== Bibliography ==
- Weakley, Alan S.; Southeastern Flora Team (2022). "Flora of the southeastern United States". University of North Carolina Herbarium, North Carolina Botanical Garden.
