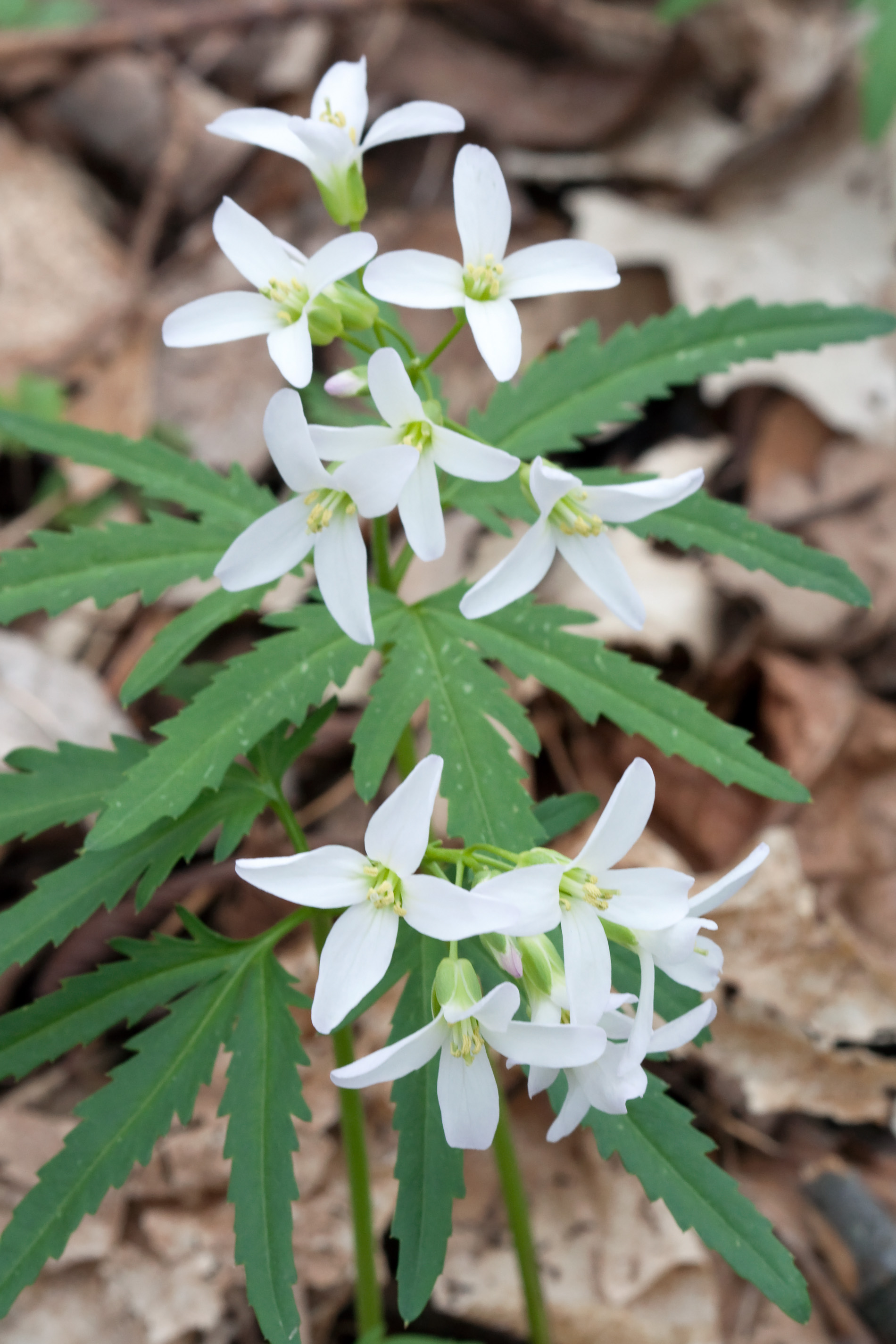

Conservation status
- Secure (NatureServe)

Scientific classification
- Kingdom: Plantae
- Clade: Embryophytes
- Clade: Tracheophytes
- Clade: Angiosperms
- Clade: Eudicots
- Clade: Rosids
- Order: Brassicales
- Family: Brassicaceae
- Genus: Cardamine
- Species: C. concatenata

Binomial name
- Cardamine concatenata (Michx.) O.Schwarz

Synonyms
- Homotypic Synonyms: Dentaria concatenata Michx.; Heterotypic Synonyms: Cardamine laciniata (Muhl. ex Willd.) Alph.Wood; Cardamine laciniata var. integra O.E.Schulz; Cardamine laciniata f. minor (DC.) O.E.Schulz; Dentaria laciniata Muhl. ex Willd.; Dentaria laciniata f. albiflora Louis-Marie; Dentaria laciniata var. alterna Farw.; Dentaria laciniata var. coalescens Fernald; Dentaria laciniata f. hexifolia Wolden; Dentaria laciniata var. integra (O.E.Schulz) Fernald; Dentaria laciniata var. latifolia Farw.; Dentaria laciniata var. minor DC.; Dentaria laciniata var. opposita Farw.

= Cardamine concatenata =

Species of flowering plant in the cabbage family

Cardamine concatenata, the cutleaved toothwort, crow's toes, pepper root or purple-flowered toothwort, is a flowering plant in the family Brassicaceae. It is a perennial woodland wildflower native to eastern North America.

== Description ==
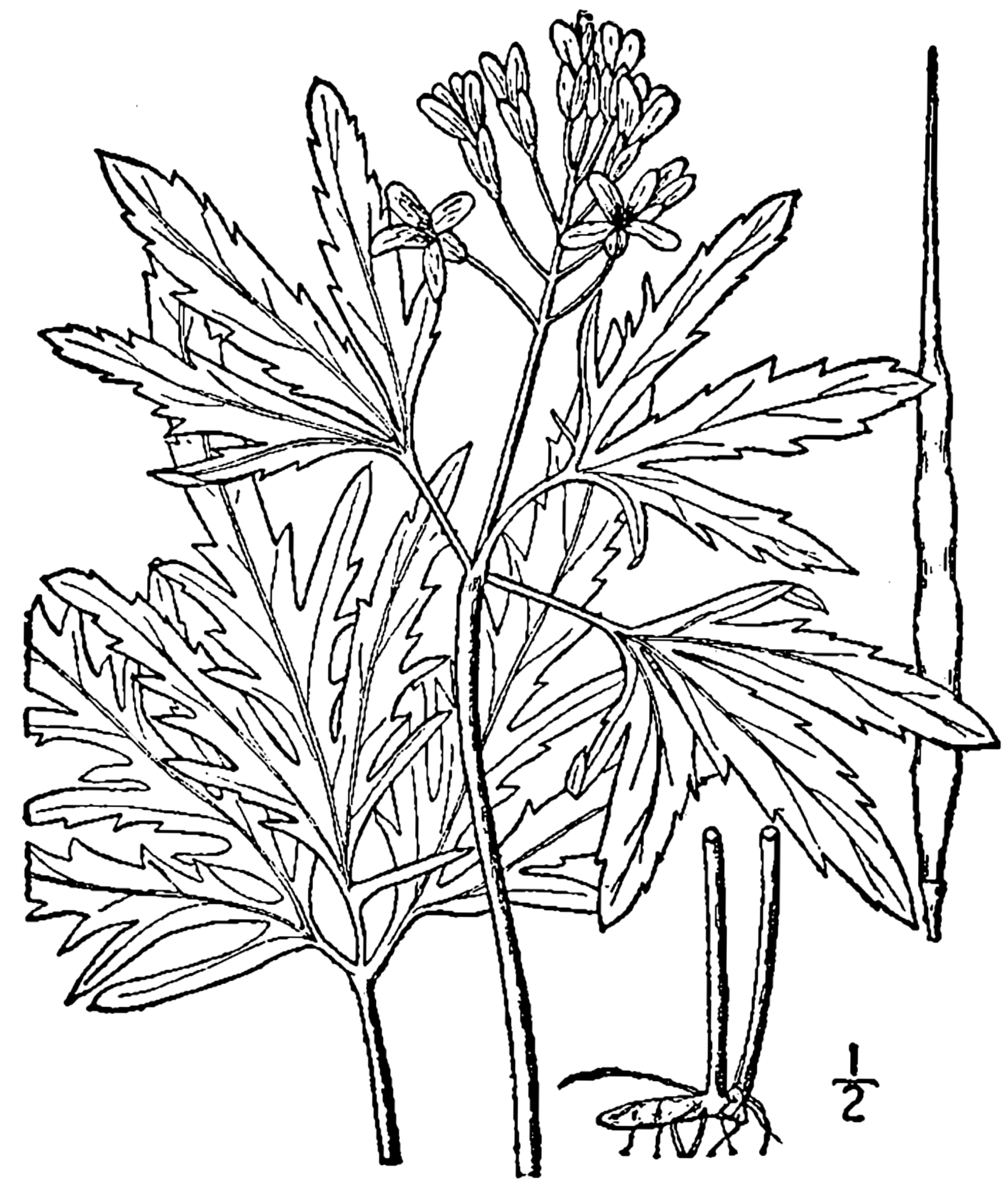
Botanical illustration of Cardamine concatenata (1913)

Cardamine concatenata is a member of the Cardamine concatenata alliance, a distinctive group of species that includes Cardamine angustata, Cardamine concatenata, Cardamine diphylla, Cardamine dissecta, Cardamine incisa, and Cardamine maxima. Members of the alliance are morphologically similar, with an elongated fleshy rhizome and either ternate or palmately compound leaves.

The vegetative parts of this plant, which can reach 20–40 cm (7.9–15.7 in), arise from a segmented rhizome. The leaves are on long petioles, deeply and palmately dissected into five segments with large "teeth" on the margins. The white to pinkish flowers are held above the foliage in a spike. Fruit is an elongated pod which can be up to 4 cm (1.6 in) long.

== Taxonomy ==
Cardamine concatenata was first described as Dentaria concatenata by the French botanist André Michaux in 1803. Otto Karl Anton Schwarz placed Dentaria concatenata Michx. in genus Cardamine in 1939. The name Cardamine concatenata (Michx.) O.Schwarz is widely used today.

Cardamine concatenata is a member of the Cardamine concatenata alliance, a group of species that includes Cardamine angustata, Cardamine concatenata, Cardamine diphylla, Cardamine dissecta, Cardamine incisa, and Cardamine maxima. Members of the alliance were previously placed in genus Dentaria Tourn. ex L., which is now considered to be a synonym for Cardamine L. The alliance is strongly supported as a monophyletic group, which is consistent with the strong morphological resemblance among the species.

== Distribution and habitat ==
Cardamine concatenata, like all members of the Cardamine concatenata alliance, is native to eastern North America. It has the widest distribution of any member of the alliance, with a range that extends north to Québec and Ontario, south to Florida and Texas, and west to Kansas and Oklahoma. It is known to occur in the following provinces and states:

- Canada: Ontario, Québec
- United States: Alabama, Arkansas, Connecticut, Delaware, District of Columbia, Florida, Georgia, Illinois, Indiana, Iowa, Kansas, Kentucky, Louisiana, Maine, Maryland, Massachusetts, Michigan, Minnesota, Mississippi, Missouri, Nebraska, New Hampshire, New Jersey, New York, North Carolina, Ohio, Oklahoma, Pennsylvania, South Carolina, Tennessee, Texas, Vermont, Virginia, West Virginia, Wisconsin

In the eastern United States where the distribution of Cardamine concatenata is widespread, it occurs in most of the counties of Missouri, Illinois, Indiana, and Ohio. It occupies rich deciduous forest habitats such as rich woods, wooded bottomlands, limestone outcrops, and rocky banks and bluffs.

== Ecology ==
Cardamine concatenata blooms from February to May. It serves as a host plant for the imperiled butterfly Pieris virginiensis.

== Conservation ==
The global conservation status of Cardamine concatenata is secure (G5).

== Uses ==
The roots can be washed, chopped and ground in vinegar to be used as a horseradish substitute. According to Hussey (1974), "the Indians ate the pungent root."

== Bibliography ==
- Gilman, Arthur V. (2015). New Flora of Vermont. Memoirs of The New York Botanical Garden, Volume 110. Bronx, New York, USA: The New York Botanical Garden Press. ISBN 978-0-89327-516-7.
- Haines, Arthur (2011). New England Wild Flower Society's Flora Novae Angliae: A Manual for the Identification of Native and Naturalized Higher Vascular Plants of New England. Illustrated by Elizabeth Farnsworth and Gordon Morrison. Yale University Press. ISBN 978-0-300-17154-9.
- Michaux, André (March 1803). Flora Boreali-Americana. Vol. 2. Paris and Strasbourg.
- Sweeney, Patrick W.; Price, Robert A. (2000). "Polyphyly of the Genus Dentaria (Brassicaceae): Evidence from trnL Intron and ndhF Sequence Data". Systematic Botany. 25 (3): 468–478. doi:10.2307/2666690. JSTOR 2666690.
- Sweeney, Patrick W.; Price, Robert A. (2001). "A multivariate morphological analysis of the Cardamine concatenata alliance (Brassicaceae)". Brittonia. 53 (1): 82–95. Bibcode:2001Britt..53...82S. doi:10.1007/BF02805400.
- Weakley, Alan S.; Southeastern Flora Team (2022). "Flora of the southeastern United States". University of North Carolina Herbarium, North Carolina Botanical Garden.
