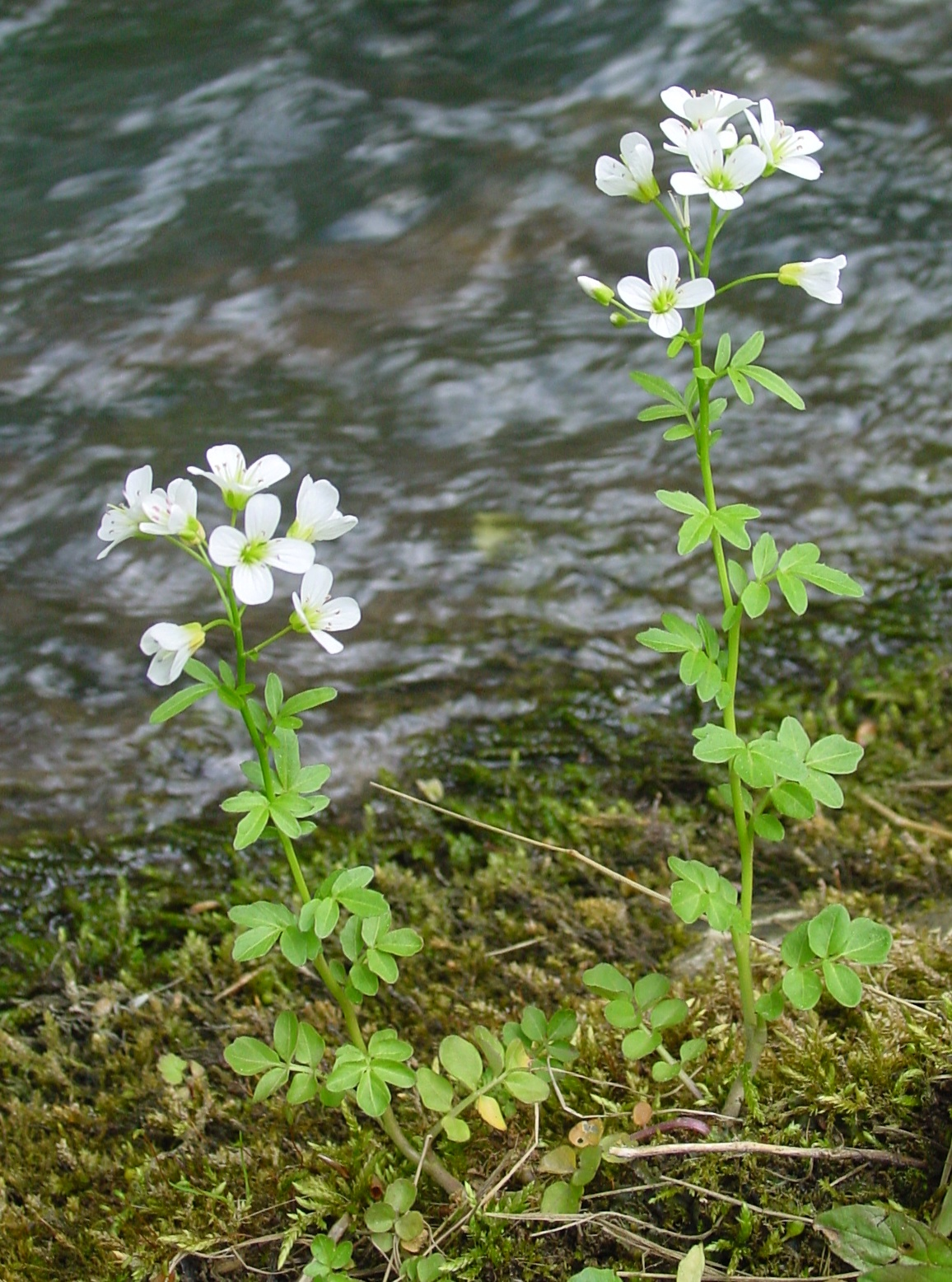

Scientific classification
- Kingdom: Plantae
- Clade: Tracheophytes
- Clade: Angiosperms
- Clade: Eudicots
- Clade: Rosids
- Order: Brassicales
- Family: Brassicaceae
- Genus: Cardamine
- Species: C. amara

Binomial name
- Cardamine amara L.

Synonyms
- Cardamine borealis Laest. ex Nyman; Cardamine grandis Schur; Cardamine libertiana Lej.; Cardamine macrophylla Schur; Cardamine melananthera Steud.; Cardamine melanthera Stokes; Cardamine nasturtiana Thuill.; Cardamine nasturtium Wallr.; Cardamine triphylla Pall.; Cardamine umbrosa Lej.; Cardamine wiedmanniana Boiss.; Crucifera amara E.H.L.Krause; Ghinia amara Bubani

= Cardamine amara =

Large bitter-cress

Species of flowering plant in the cabbage family

Cardamine amara, known as large bitter-cress, is a species of flowering plant in the family Brassicaceae. It is a perennial with upright, mostly unbranched, stems to 70 cm (28 in) tall, and leaves made up of between three and 13 leaflets. The flowers have petals that are 8–14 mm (0.3–0.6 in) long and are generally white, although sometimes pink or purple. It is found in damp places.

It is concentrated almost entirely in Europe, with a small and dispersed population in Asia and New Zealand.
