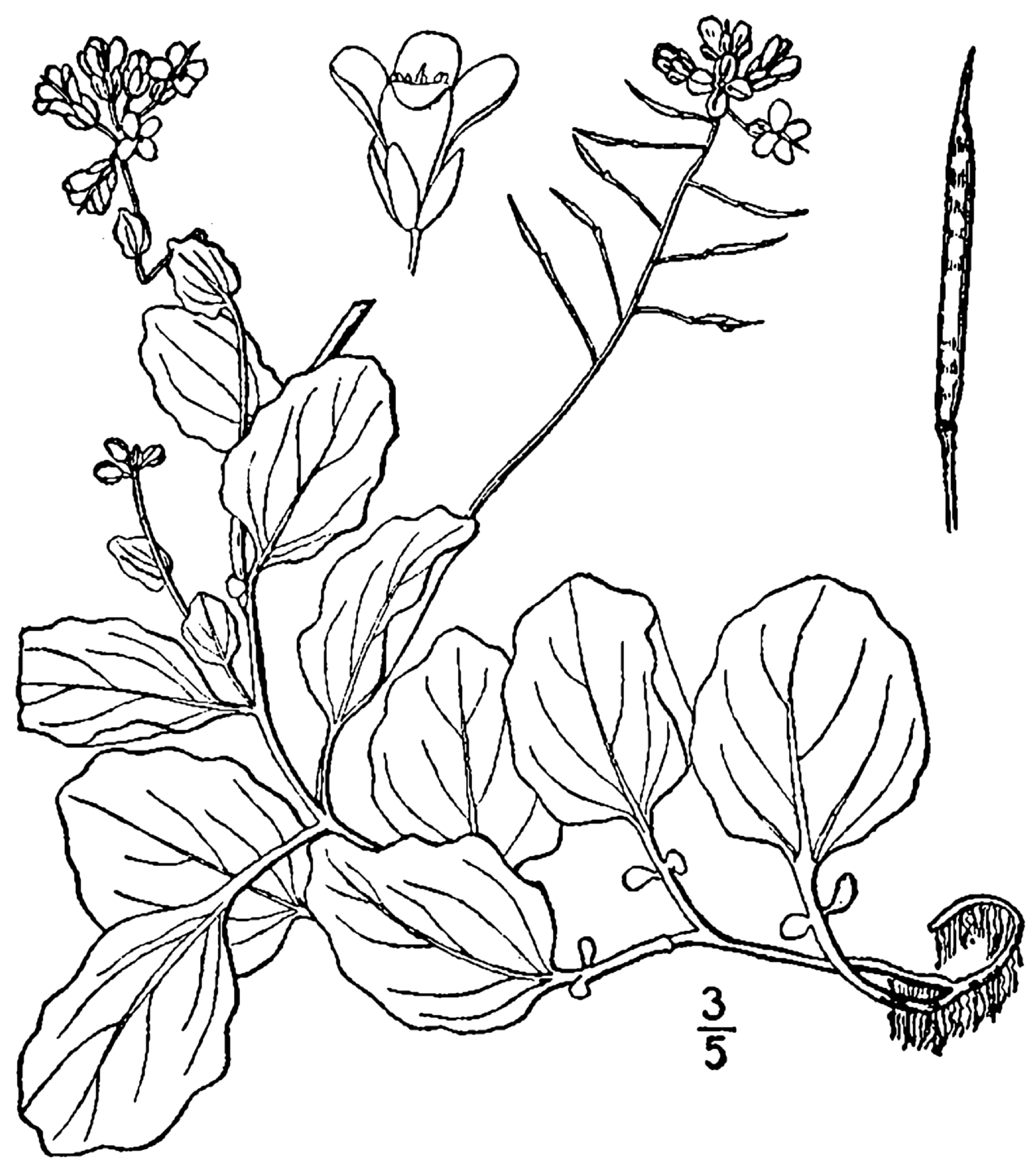
- A depiction of Cardamine rotundifolia

Scientific classification
- Kingdom: Plantae
- Clade: Tracheophytes
- Clade: Angiosperms
- Clade: Eudicots
- Clade: Rosids
- Order: Brassicales
- Family: Brassicaceae
- Genus: Cardamine
- Species: C. rotundifolia

Binomial name
- Cardamine rotundifolia Michx.

= Cardamine rotundifolia =

Species of plant

Cardamine rotundifolia, also known as American bittercress or mountain bittercress, is a perennial herbaceous brassica native to eastern North America. It was first described by André Michaux in his publication Flora Boreali-Americana (1803).
