= Alphonso Wood =

American botanist (1810–1881)

Alphonso Wood (1810 – January 4, 1881) was an American botanist and theology instructor. He was the author of several works on botany that were popularly used as instructional texts in the 19th century.

== Career ==
Wood studied at both Dartmouth College and Andover Theological Seminary. He started his teaching career as the Latin and natural science instructor at Kimball Union Academy in Meriden, New Hampshire. Later he served as the President of the Female Seminary of Cleveland, Ohio, Principal of the Clinton Female Seminary in Brooklyn, and professor of botany at Terre Haute Female College in Indiana. He retired from his instructional work in 1867 and lived the remainder of his life in West Farms, New York.

In an obituary in The Gardener's Monthly and Horticulturist, Wood was described as performing the important task of taking the progressive scientific research of botanists and making their "knowledge widely distributed" through "universal" textbooks.
