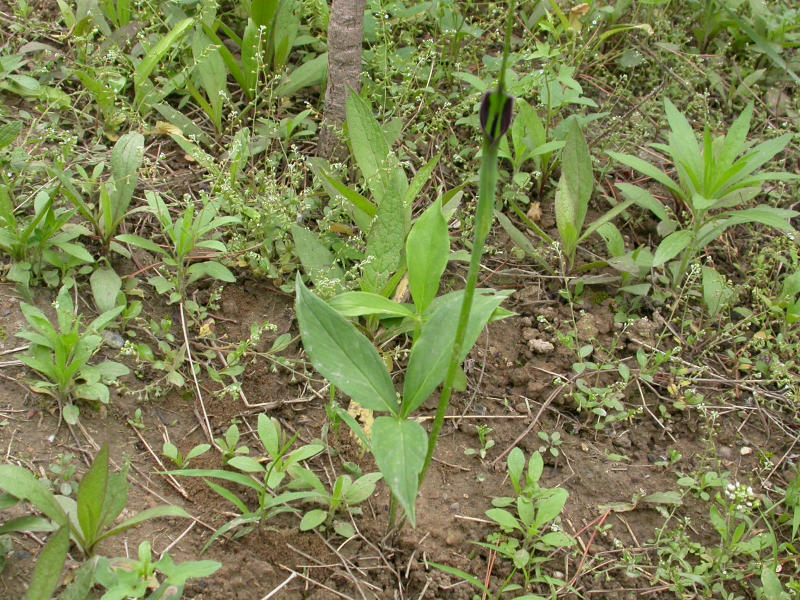
- Pinellia ternata

Scientific classification
- Kingdom: Plantae
- Clade: Tracheophytes
- Clade: Angiosperms
- Clade: Monocots
- Order: Alismatales
- Family: Araceae
- Subfamily: Aroideae
- Tribe: Arisaemateae
- Genus: Pinellia; Ten.

Type species
- Pinellia tuberifera
- Range of the genus Pinellia

Synonyms
- Atherurus Blume; Hemicarpurus Nees

= Pinellia =

Genus of flowering plants

Pinellia is a genus of plants in the family Araceae native to East Asia (China, Korea, Japan). Its species are commonly called green dragons due to the color and shape of the inflorescence, which possesses a green, hooded spathe from which protrudes a long, tongue-like extension of the spadix. The leaves vary greatly in shape among different species, from simple and cordate to compound with three to many leaflets. Pinellia reproduces rapidly from seed and many species also produce bulbils on the leaves. Both characteristics have allowed some species to become weedy in temperate areas outside their native range, notably Pinellia ternata in eastern North America.

== Species ==
Image	Name	Distribution
	Pinellia cordata N.E.Br.	Anhui, Fujian, Guangdong, Guangxi, Guizhou, Hubei, Hunan, Jiangxi, Zhejiang
	Pinellia fujianensis H.Li & G.H.Zhu	Fujian
	Pinellia integrifolia N.E.Br.	Sichuan, Chongqing, Hubei
	Pinellia pedatisecta Schott	Anhui, Fujian, Guangxi, Guizhou, Hebei, Henan, Hubei, Hunan, Jiangsu, Shaanxi, Shandong, Shanxi, Sichuan, Yunnan, Zhejiang
	Pinellia peltata C.Pei	Fujian, Zhejiang
	Pinellia polyphylla S.L.Hu	Sichuan
	Pinellia ternata (Thunb.) Makino	Japan, Korea, Ryukyu Islands, most of eastern + central China; naturalized in Germany, Austria, California, Ontario, northeastern United States
	Pinellia tripartita (Blume) Schott	Japan, Ryukyu Islands, Hong Kong
	Pinellia yaoluopingensis X.H.Guo & X.L.Liu	Anhui, Jiangsu

== Use in Traditional Chinese Medicine ==
The processed root of Pinellia ternata, known as Zhi ban xia or Ban xia, is one of the most important herbs in Chinese Medicine to transform phlegm and stop coughing. The herb is warm and drying and should be used only in people who are not hot or dry (known as yin deficient.) It is used in small 3-6 gram dosages in herbal formulas to warmly dry the lungs, to stop nausea and vomiting, and to address goiters or scrofula. Slices of the dried root are also used as a base for moxibustion. Because the raw root is toxic, it is soaked in water to remove oxalates and other irritants, or processed with ginger. Unprocessed root is only used externally in Chinese Medicine.

When listed as an ingredient in a supplement for weight loss or energy, Pinellia has been charged with indicating the presence of ephedra alkaloids, which would be a violation of labeling laws.
