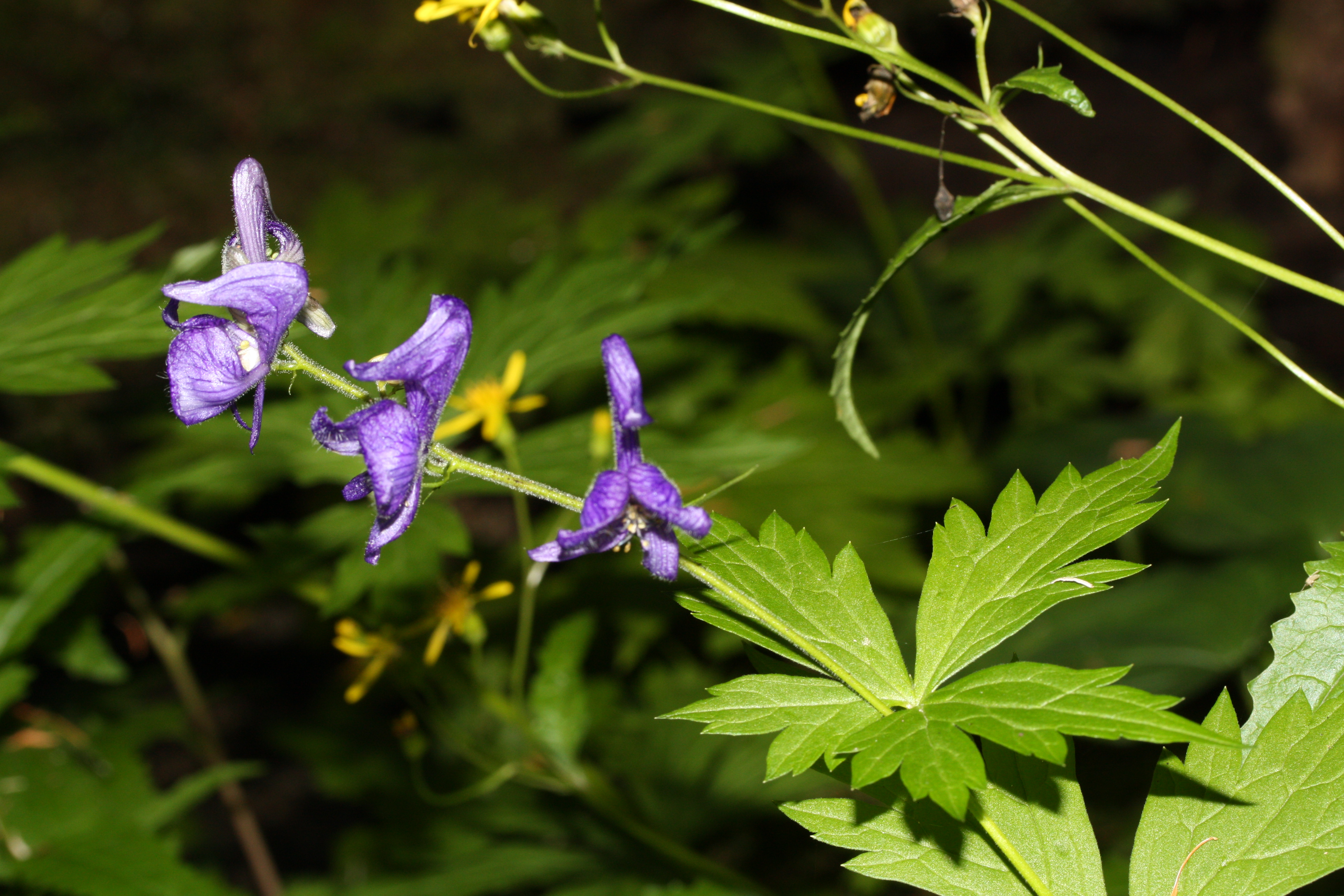
- Aconitum columbianum in Mount Baker-Snoqualmie National Forest

Conservation status
- Secure (NatureServe)

Scientific classification
- Kingdom: Plantae
- Clade: Tracheophytes
- Clade: Angiosperms
- Clade: Eudicots
- Order: Ranunculales
- Family: Ranunculaceae
- Genus: Aconitum
- Species: A. columbianum

Binomial name
- Aconitum columbianum Nutt.

Synonyms
- Aconitum geranioides Aconitum leibergii

= Aconitum columbianum =

Species of plant

Aconitum columbianum is a species of flowering plant in the buttercup family known by the common names Columbian monkshood or western monkshood.

This wildflower is native to western North America where it grows in riparian and other moist areas, in meadows and coniferous forests. It is found from 600–2,900 metres (2,000–9,500 ft) in elevation.

== Description ==
Aconitum columbianum is an herbaceous perennial that grows from a large tuber-like root with a spindle shape. The stems can be from 20-300 centimeters tall and be either erect or trailing.

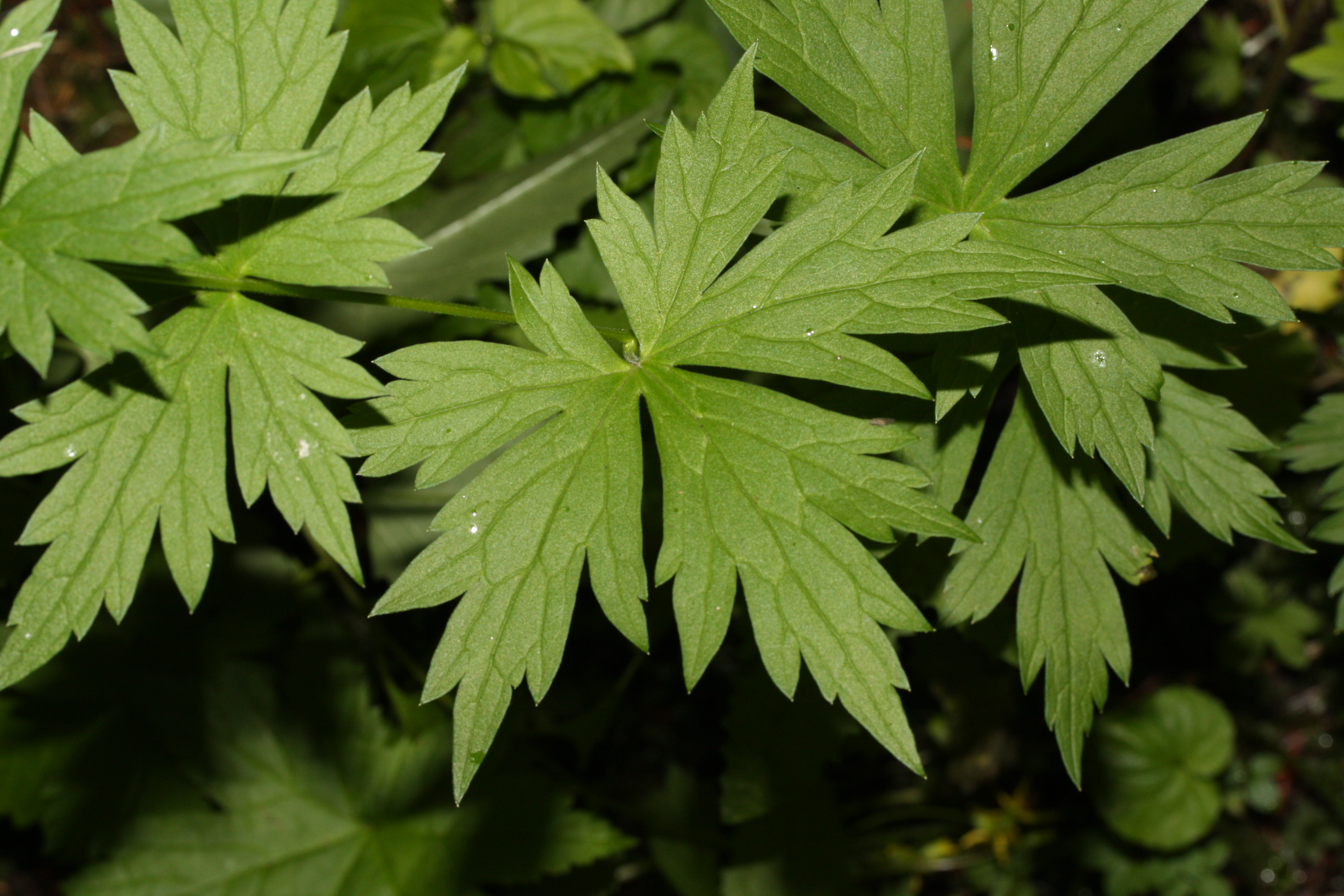
Leaves

The leaves that are attached to the stems have as many as 7 deep divisions almost reaching the base of the leaf, but most often 3–5 divisions. There are most often about 2 millimeters of leaf tissue between the stem attachment to the leaf and the deepest point of each leaf division. The edges of each leaf segment are toothed or cleft. Each leaf is 5–15 centimeters wide.

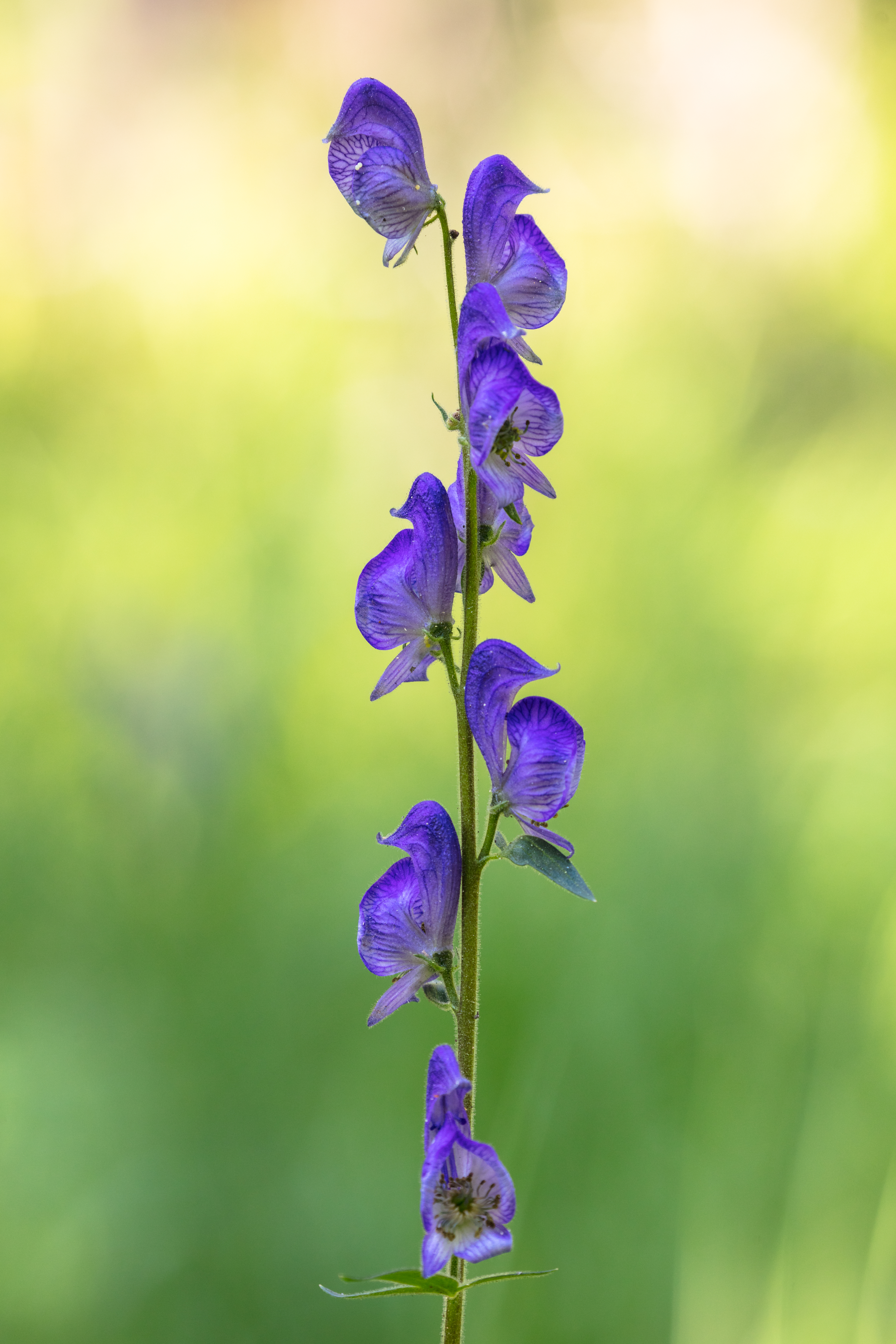
Flowering, Yellowstone National Park

The flowering stem can either be a single stem without branches and multiple flowers called a raceme or a branched panicle. The flowers are most often blue, but can occasionally be white, cream colored, or white with a blush of blue at the margins of the sepals. The flowers are variable in size and can measure from 18–55 mm from the top of the upright "hood" sepal to the tips of the two downward pointing sepals. The two hanging (pendulous) sepals measure 6–16 mm. The prominent hood varies in shape from being rounded to conical or even more of a crescent shape and measures 10–34 mm from the base where it inserts into the supporting stem to the top of the hood.

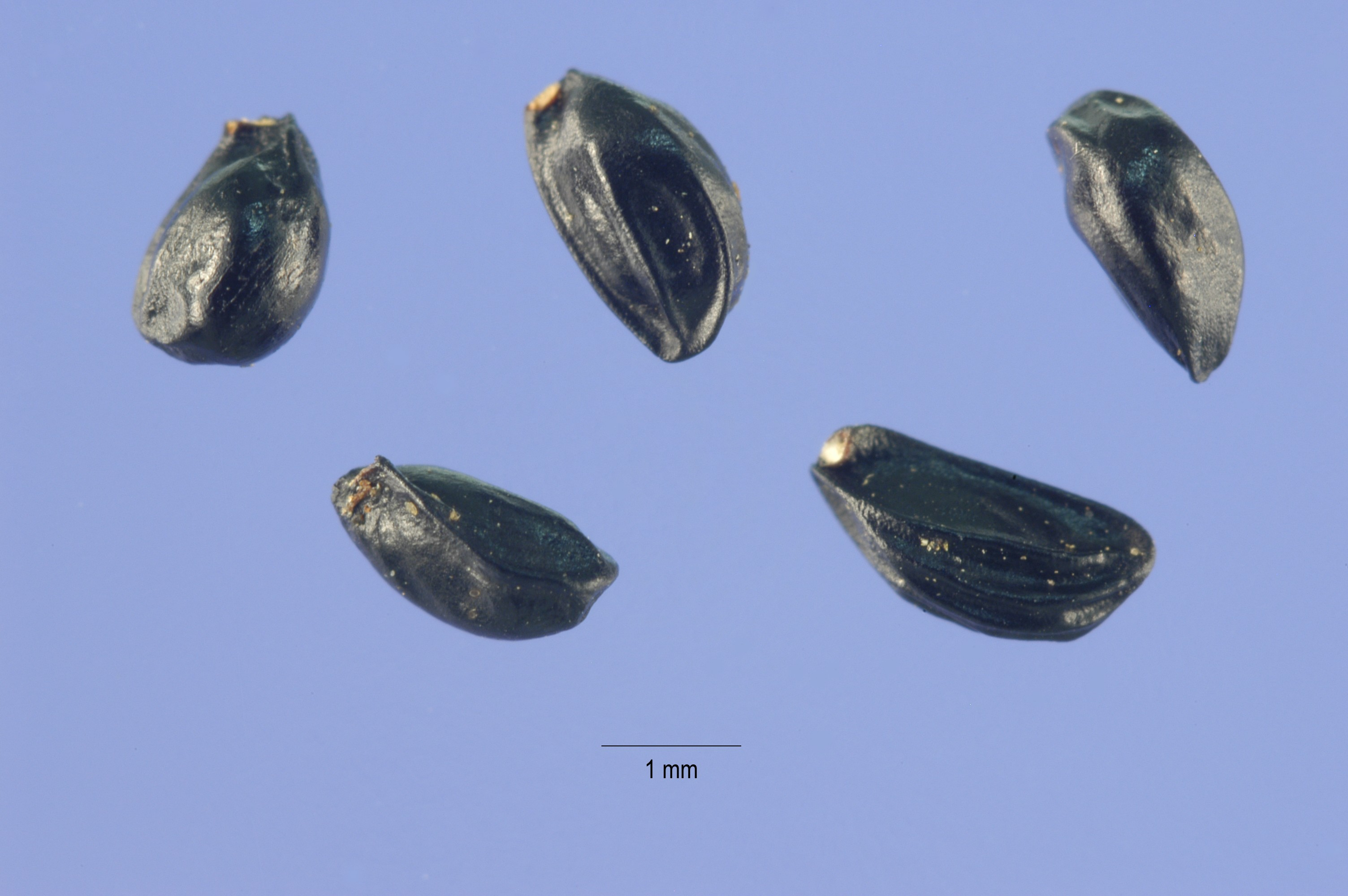
Seeds

The fruits are dry pod-like follicles, 10–20 mm long.

Like other monkshoods (Aconitum species), this plant is poisonous to humans and livestock, although some species have been used to make drugs.

== Taxonomy ==
Aconitum columbianum was first scientifically described by Thomas Nuttall in 1838 in A flora of North America by Torrey and Gray. It was described from specimens collected from "springy places on the Oregon, below Wallawallah".

=== Subspecies ===
Two subspecies or varieties are recognized by Plants of the World Online (POWO) as of 2023:

- Aconitum columbianum var. columbianum
- Aconitum columbianum var. howellii (A.Nelson & J.F.Macbr.) C.L.Hitchc.

One other subspecies, Aconitum columbianum ssp. viviparum, is recognized by some botanists or botanical organizations such as Gilkey and Dennis in the Handbook of Northwestern Plants, the USDA Natural Resources Conservation Service PLANTS database (PLANTS), and the Flora of North America (FNA). Aconitum columbianum ssp. viviparum differs from the nominate subspecies, A. columbianum var. columbianum, in having bulbils where the leaf stems meet the main stem of the plant (in the leaf axils) and sometimes in place of flowers.

== Range and habitat ==
Aconitum columbianum grows throughout the western United States, from the west coast through the Rocky Mountains. In addition, it is also found in parts of British Columbia and South Dakota. It is also reported to grow in Iowa, Wisconsin, New York, and the Mexican states of Sonora and Chihuahua.

In 2016, NatureServe evaluated Aconitum columbianum as globally secure (G5). In addition it is evaluated by them as vulnerable at the state level (S3) in Wyoming.

== Cultivation ==
Western monkshood is occasionally grown in gardens for its dark purple-blue blossoms. It requires a moist and rich soil as well as shade in all but the gentlest of climates.
