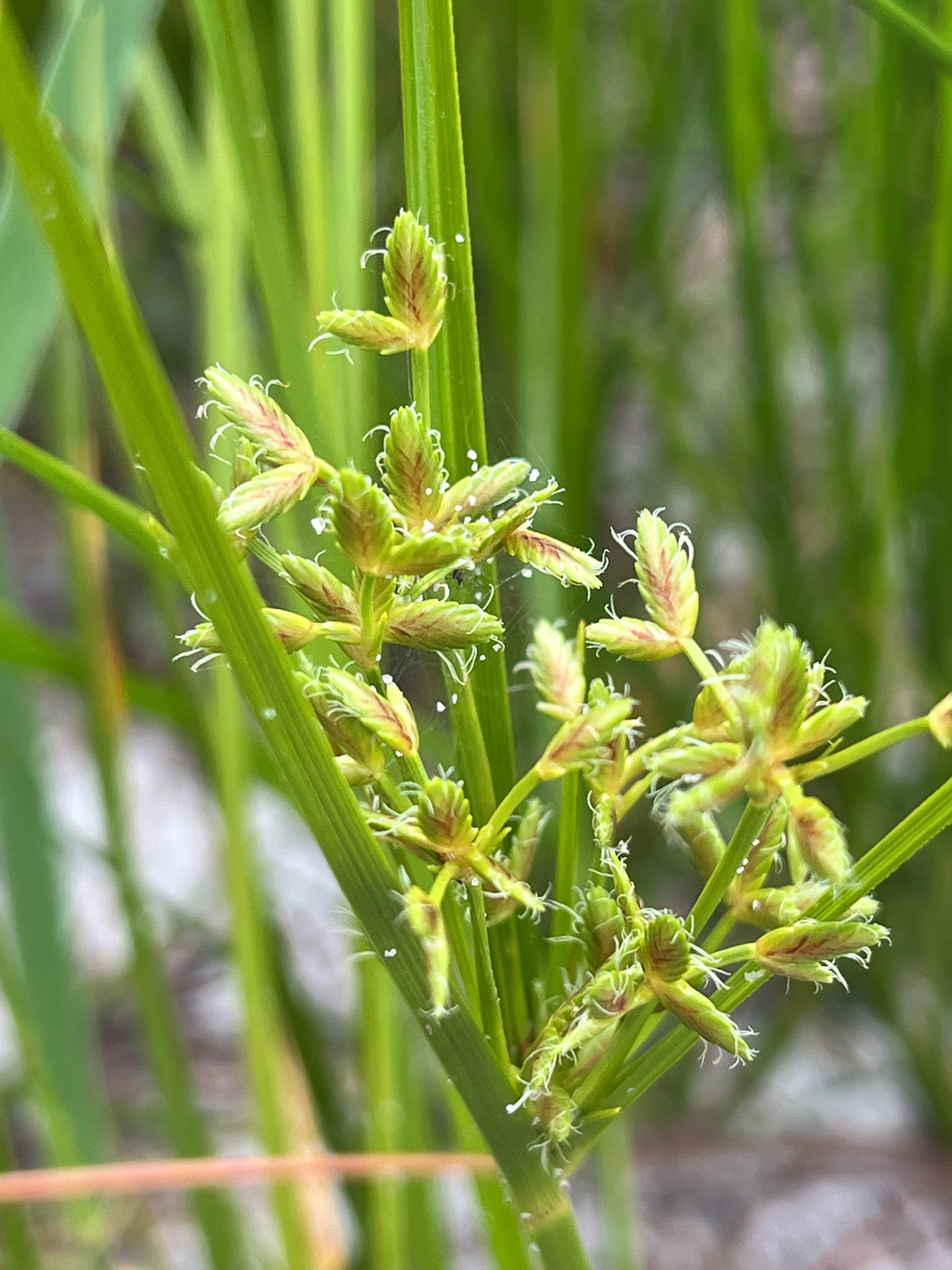
- Clay County, Florida in May

Scientific classification
- Kingdom: Plantae
- Clade: Tracheophytes
- Clade: Angiosperms
- Clade: Monocots
- Clade: Commelinids
- Order: Poales
- Family: Cyperaceae
- Genus: Cyperus
- Species: C. lecontei

Binomial name
- Cyperus lecontei Torr. ex Steud.

Synonyms
- Homotypic synonyms: Cyperus dentatus var. multiradiatus Torr.; Cyperus multiradiatus (Torr.) C.Mohr

= Cyperus lecontei =

Species of sedge

Cyperus lecontei, also known as Le Conte's flatsedge, is a species of flowering plant in the sedge family Cyperaceae. It is native to the southeastern United States where it is most common in the state of Florida. The species is named in honor of the American naturalist John Eatton Le Conte (1784–1860) who collected the type specimen in eastern Florida.

== Description ==
Cyperus lecontei is a perennial, herbaceous sedge that persists via a creeping rhizome. Its inflorescence bears clusters of spikelets, each with numerous florets. Each floret is covered by a scale, which is a type of bract in sedges and grasses.

In 1836, the American botanist John Torrey described Cyperus lecontei as a variety of Cyperus dentatus with the following characters:

- Stem two feet long, leafy at the base, leaves shorter than the stem
- Inflorescence is a compound umbel with 10–12 primary rays
- Six (6) leaf-like bracts at the base of the inflorescence
- A cluster of 3–5 compressed spikelets terminates each secondary ray of the inflorescence
- Each spikelet has 14–24 florets covered by scales with obtuse tips (greater than 90 degrees)

In contrast to Cyperus dentatus, Torrey noted that Cyperus lecontei had longer, more numerous primary rays and floral scales with obtuse (not acute) tips.

A more detailed description was published in Flora of North America in 2002. Cyperus dentatus has stems 10–50 cm (4–20 in) long. It is leafy at the base, with leaves 10–40 cm (4–16 in) long and 2–5 mm wide. The inflorescence is a compound umbel with 5–12 primary rays, each ray up to 12 cm (5 in) long. There are 3–5 leaf-like bracts at the base of the inflorescence. A cluster of 2–4 compressed spikelets terminates each secondary ray of the inflorescence. Each spikelet has 20–60 florets covered by straw-colored or reddish green scales. Each floret is bisexual with three anthers and a single style with three branched stigmas. The anthers and stigmas emerge from the axil of the floral scale but a perianth is absent. The fruit is an achene less than 1 mm long.

== Taxonomy ==
In 1836, the American botanist John Torrey described the variety Cyperus dentatus var. multiradiatus based on specimens collected in the southern U.S. states of Florida and Louisiana. Torrey noted that the taxon might be a distinct species, in which case he proposed the name Cyperus lecontei in honor of the American naturalist John Eatton Le Conte who had previously collected the type specimen in eastern Florida. Subsequently Cyperus lecontei was described by the German botanist Ernst Gottlieb Steudel in 1854. As of January 2026, the name Cyperus dentatus var. multiradiatus Torr. is considered to be a homotypic synonym of Cyperus lecontei Torr. ex Steud. The latter is a widely accepted botanical name.

== Distribution and habitat ==
Cyperus lecontei is native to the southeastern United States. Its range extends from Arkansas and Louisiana eastward along the Gulf Coastal Plain across the Florida panhandle to the Atlantic Coastal Plain of the Carolinas. It is a rare species in all U.S. states except Florida, where it is common.

== Ecology ==
Cyperus lecontei is a perennial, herbaceous, flowering plant whose season runs from July to September.

== See also ==
- List of Cyperus species

== Bibliography ==
- Steudel, Ernst Gottlieb (1855). Synopsis Plantarum Glumacearum. Stuttgartaiae: J. B. Metzler.
- Torrey, John (1836). "Monograph of the North American Cyperaceae". Annals of the Lyceum of Natural History of New York. 3: 239–448.
