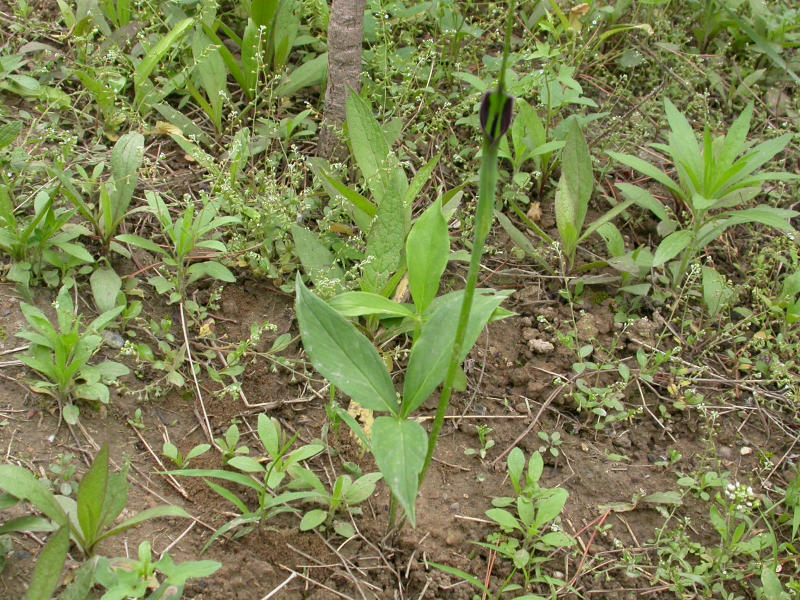

Scientific classification
- Kingdom: Plantae
- Clade: Tracheophytes
- Clade: Angiosperms
- Clade: Monocots
- Order: Alismatales
- Family: Araceae
- Genus: Pinellia
- Species: P. ternata

Binomial name
- Pinellia ternata (Thunb.) Makino

Synonyms
- Homotypic Synonyms: Alocasia ternata (Thunb.) Raf.; Arisaema ternatum (Thunb.) Schott; Arum bulbiferum Salisb.; Arum ternatum Thunb.; Atherurus ternatus (Thunb.) Blume; Pinellia tuberifera Ten.; Heterotypic Synonyms: Arisaema loureiroi Blume; Arisaema macrourum (Bunge) Kunth; Arum atrorubens Spreng.; Arum bulbosum Pers. ex Kunth; Arum fornicatum Roth; Arum macrourum Bunge; Arum subulatum Desf.; Arum triphyllum Houtt.; Hemicarpurus fornicatus Nees; Pinellia angustata Schott; Pinellia fornicata (Roth) Pritz.; Pinellia koreana K.Tae & J.H.Kim; Pinellia ternata var. angustata (Schott) Engl.; Pinellia ternata f. angustata (Schott) Makino; Pinellia ternata var. atropurpurea Makino; Pinellia ternata f. atropurpurea (Makino) Ohwi; Pinellia ternata var. giraldiana Engl.; Pinellia ternata var. koreana (K.Tae & J.H.Kim) M.Kim; Pinellia ternata f. subcuspidata Honda; Pinellia ternata var. subpandurata (Engl.) Engl.; Pinellia ternata var. vulgaris Engl.; Pinellia tuberifera var. subpandurata Engl.; Typhonium tuberculigerum Schott

= Pinellia ternata =

Crow-dipper

Species of plant

Pinellia ternata (Chinese: 半夏, Japanese: カラスビシャク), crow-dipper, is a plant that is native to China, Japan, and Korea. However, it also grows as an invasive weed in parts of Europe (Austria, Germany) and in North America (California, Ontario, the northeastern United States). The leaves are trifoliate, and the flowers are of the spathe and spadix form that is typical of plants in the family Araceae.

== Characteristics ==
The plant spreads by rhizomes, and there are also small bulblets (also known as bulbils) at the base of each leaf. Flowers are borne in spring.

== Traditional medicine ==
This plant is toxic in raw form and must be processed. Pinellia ternata is known as the herb effective in removing phlegm-dampness in traditional Chinese medicine. One study found that high doses of Pinellia extract effects thermogenesis and fatty acid oxidation in Zucker rats.

== Phytochemicals ==
Pinellia ternata contains a very wide variety of phytochemicals. The alkaloids found in its rhizomes include free nucleosides (guanosine, thymidine, adenine), N-benzylisomethylamine, cycloproline, cyclo(proline-leucine), cyclo(proline-valine), choline, L-ephedrine, inosine, trigonelline, and cytidine.

=== Ephedrine content ===
- A 1996 Chinese article reports that processing method affects ephedrine levels; its native-language abstract reports a ephedrine content of 0.00344% (= 34.4 μg/g).
- One 2020 Chinese study extracted 5.50 μg/g of ephedrine from tubers through multiphase extraction.
- One 2021 Japanese study reports no ephedrine found in all 55 samples used (LC-TOF/MS, detection limit 0.5 ppb).

== Gallery ==
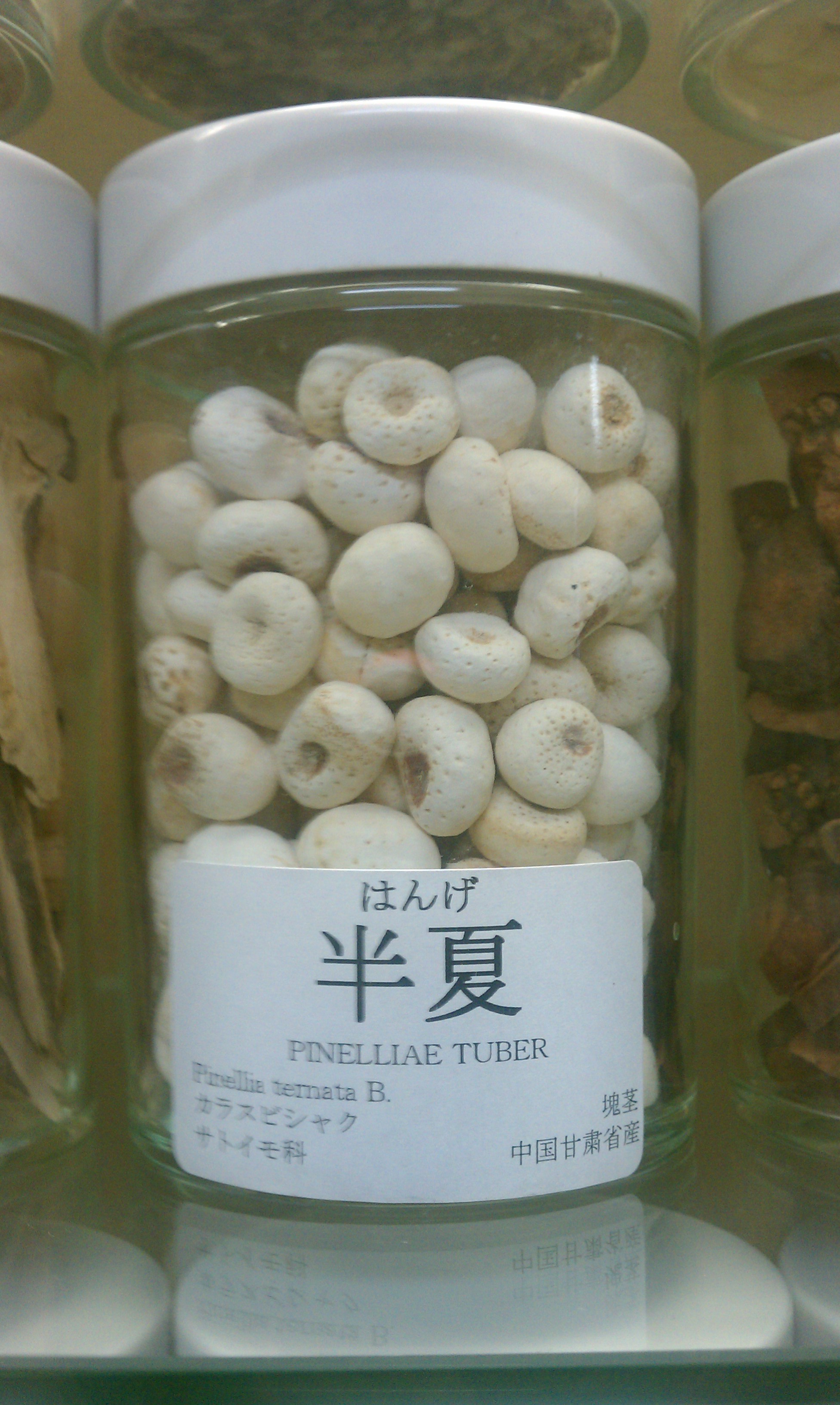
Plant as used in Chinese herbology (crude medicine)

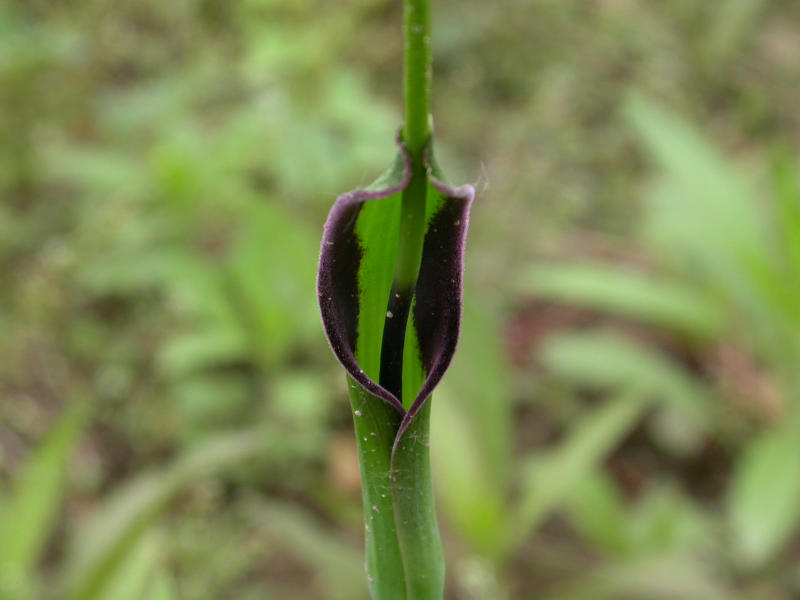
The flower of Pinellia ternata, the Inflorescence

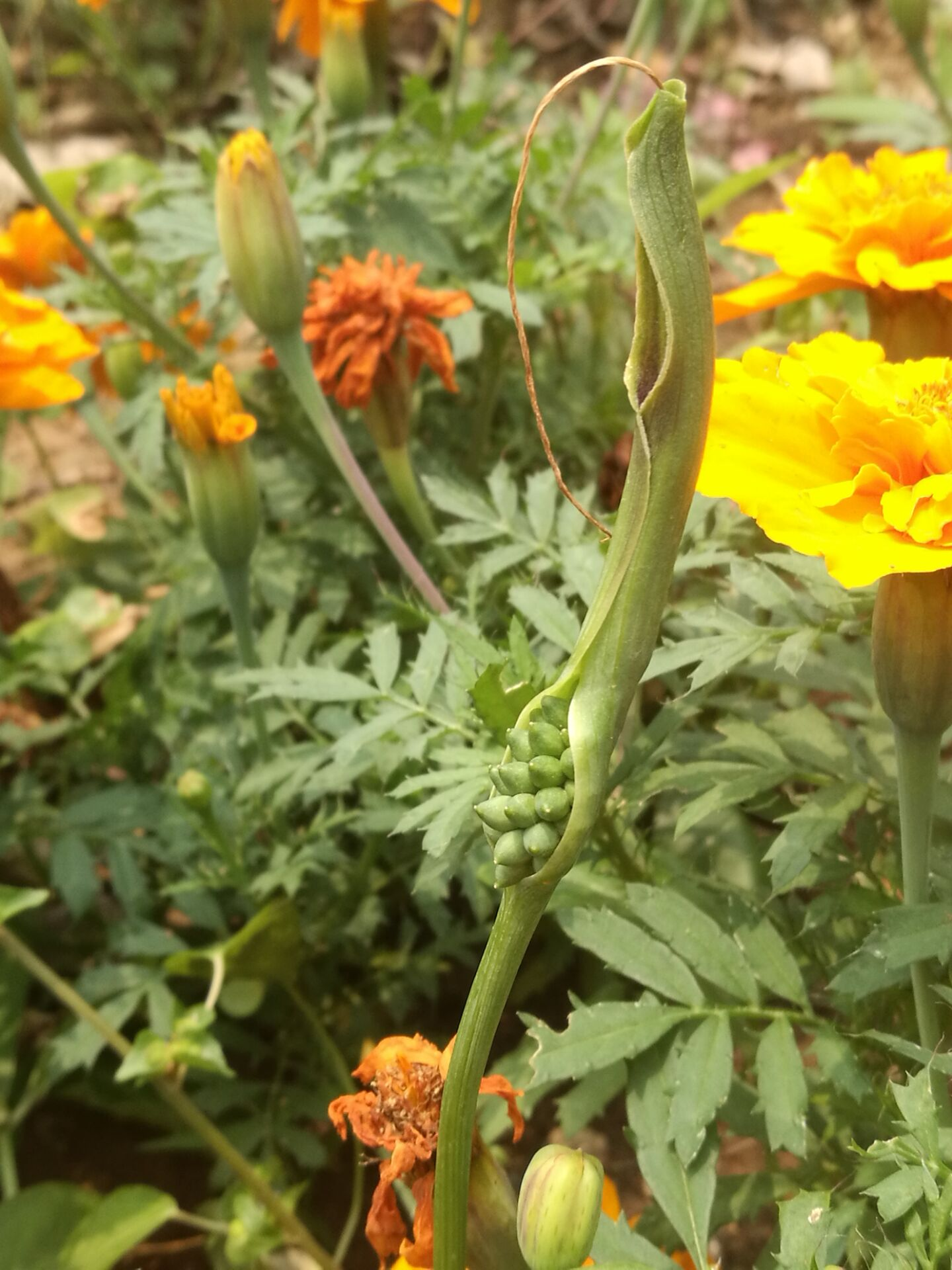
Mature Pinellia ternata

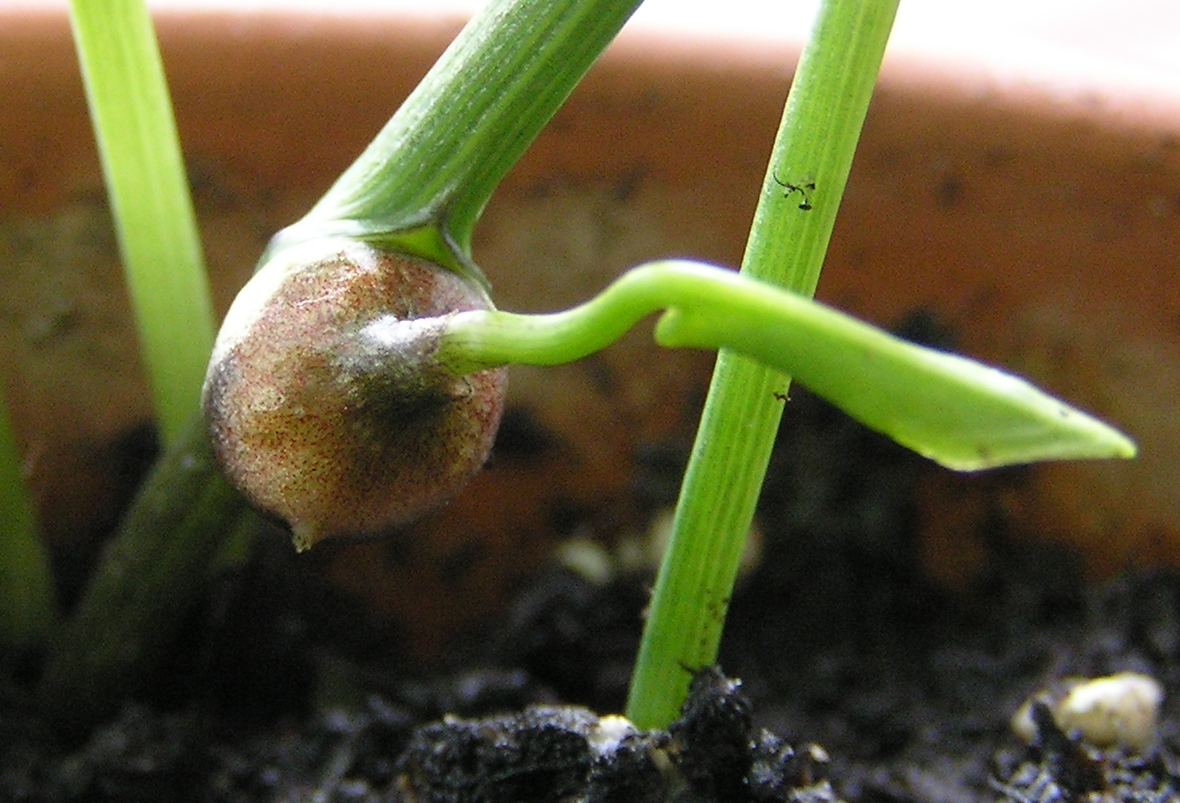
Pinellia ternata bulbil
