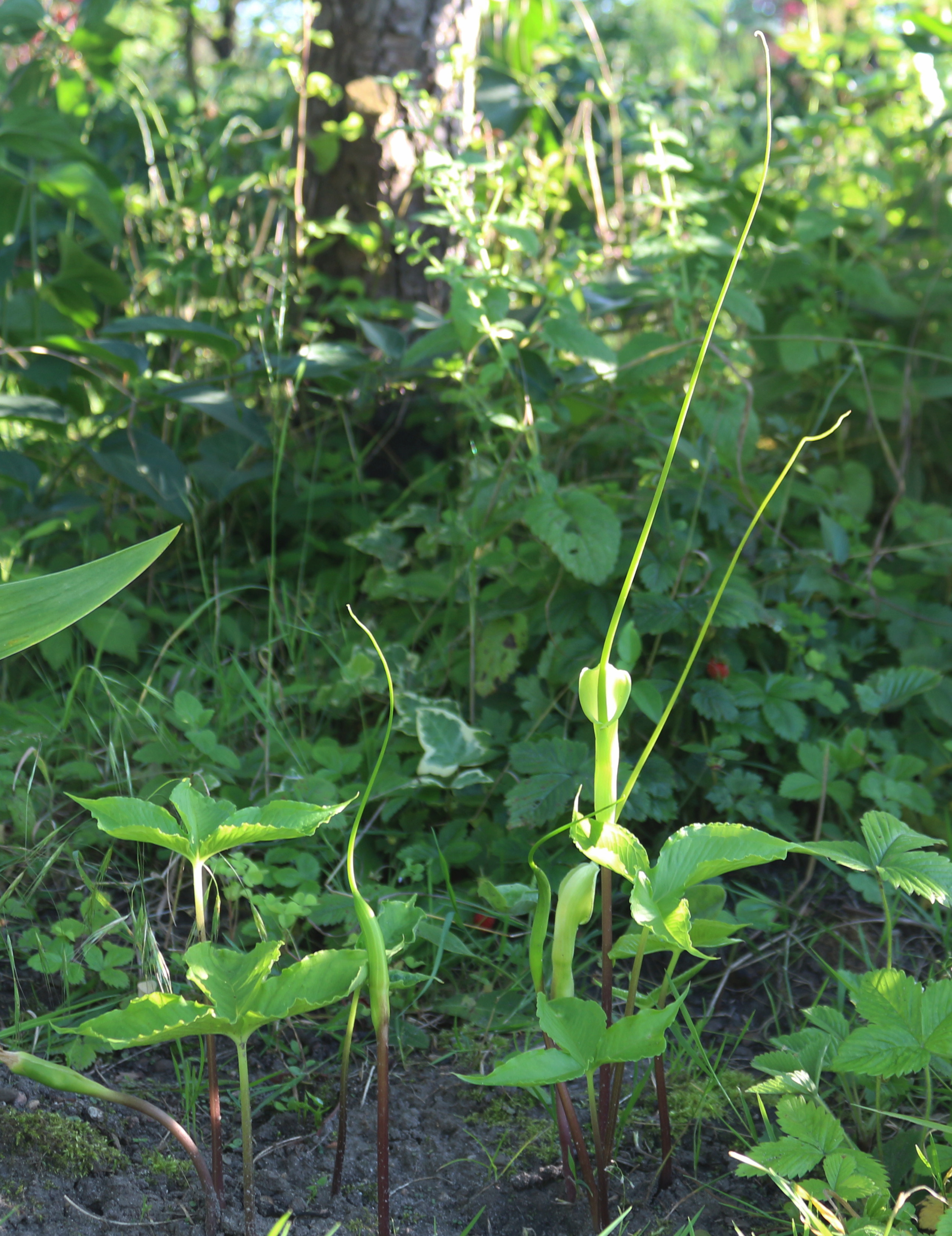
- Pinellia tripartita. Note that each leaf is divided into three parts.

Scientific classification
- Kingdom: Plantae
- Clade: Tracheophytes
- Clade: Angiosperms
- Clade: Monocots
- Order: Alismatales
- Family: Araceae
- Genus: Pinellia
- Species: P. tripartita

Binomial name
- Pinellia tripartita (Blume) Schott

Synonyms
- Pinellia tripartita f. atropurpurea Pinellia tripartita var. atropurpurea Pinellia ternata var. viridis Atherurus tripartitus Blume; Arisaema tripartitum (Blume) Engl.

= Pinellia tripartita =

Species of flowering plant

Pinellia tripartita is a species of Pinellia in the Arum family (Araceae). Purported common names include green dragon (the same as other members of its genus) and voodoo lily (the same as Amorphophallus konjac). A purple variety goes by purple dragon. It is found in Japan, including Okinawa, the Korean peninsula, and infrequently in eastern China.
