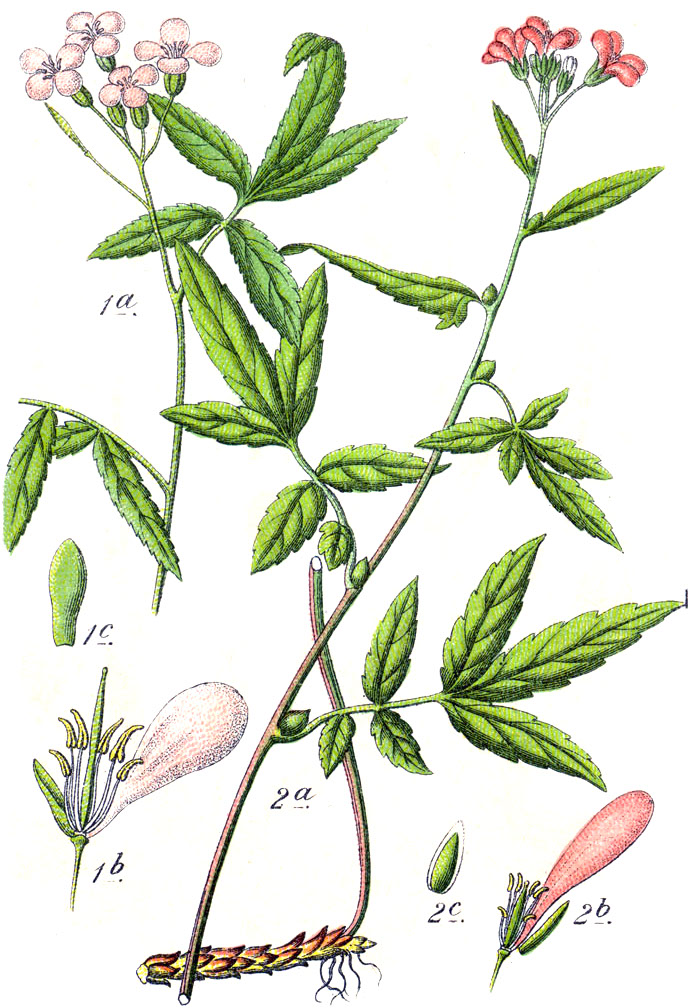

Scientific classification
- Kingdom: Plantae
- Clade: Tracheophytes
- Clade: Angiosperms
- Clade: Eudicots
- Clade: Rosids
- Order: Brassicales
- Family: Brassicaceae
- Genus: Cardamine
- Species: C. bulbifera

Binomial name
- Cardamine bulbifera (L.) Crantz, 1769

Synonyms
- Crucifera bulbifera E.H.L.Krause; Dentaria bulbifera L.; basionym

= Cardamine bulbifera =

Coralroot

Species of flowering plant in the cabbage family

Cardamine bulbifera, known as coralroot bittercress or coral root, is a species of flowering plant in the family Brassicaceae. It is a perennial with upright, mostly unbranched, stems to 70 cm (28 in) tall, and leaves made up of between three and 13 leaflets. At the base of each leaf there are bulbils which can fall off and grow into new plants. The flowers have petals that are 10–15 mm (0.4–0.6 in) long collected in corymbose few-flowered racemes and are generally light purple, pink or almost white. It is found in damp places.
