= Bulbil =

Small young plant that grows from the parent plant's stem

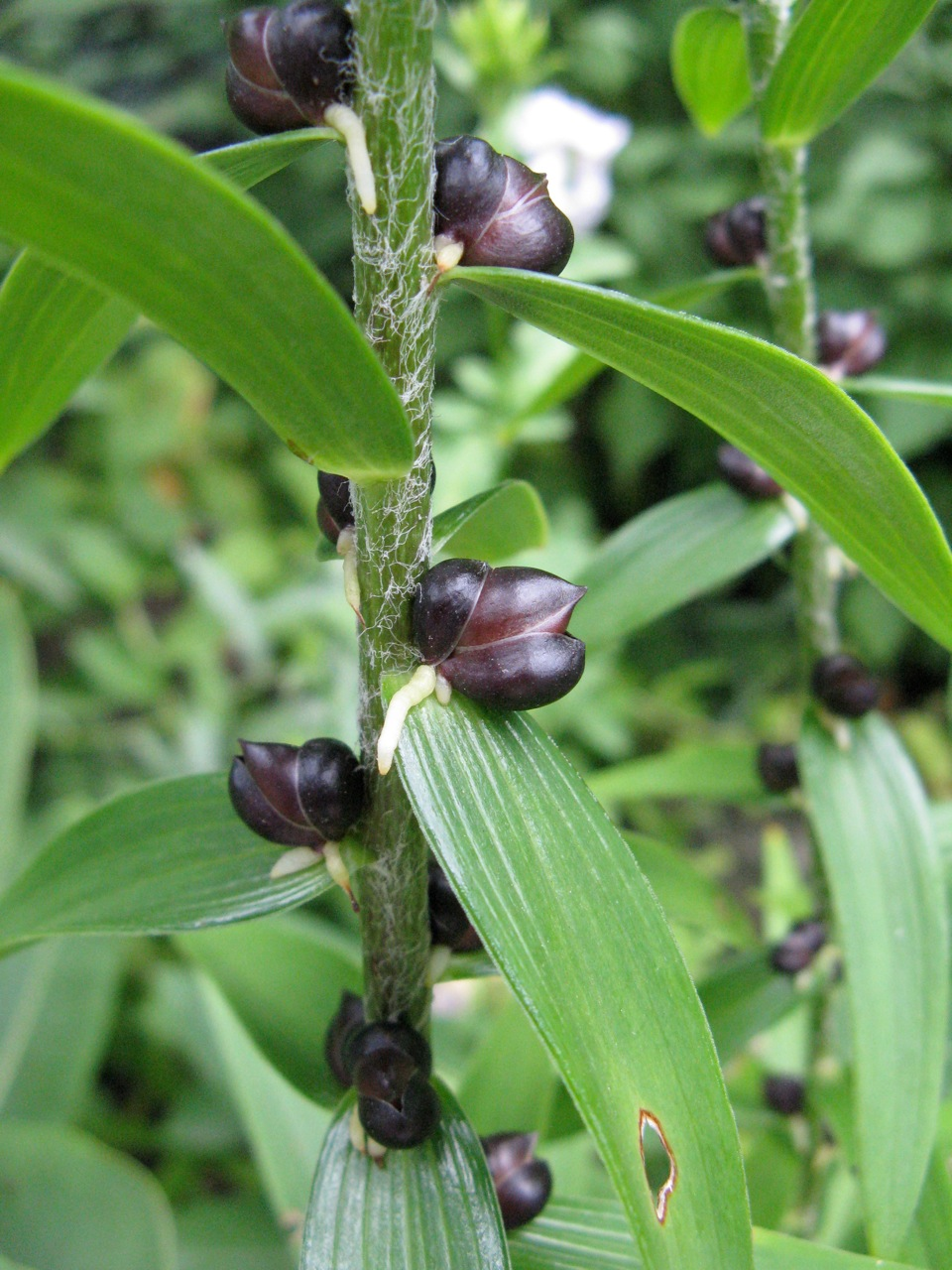
Lilium lancifolium

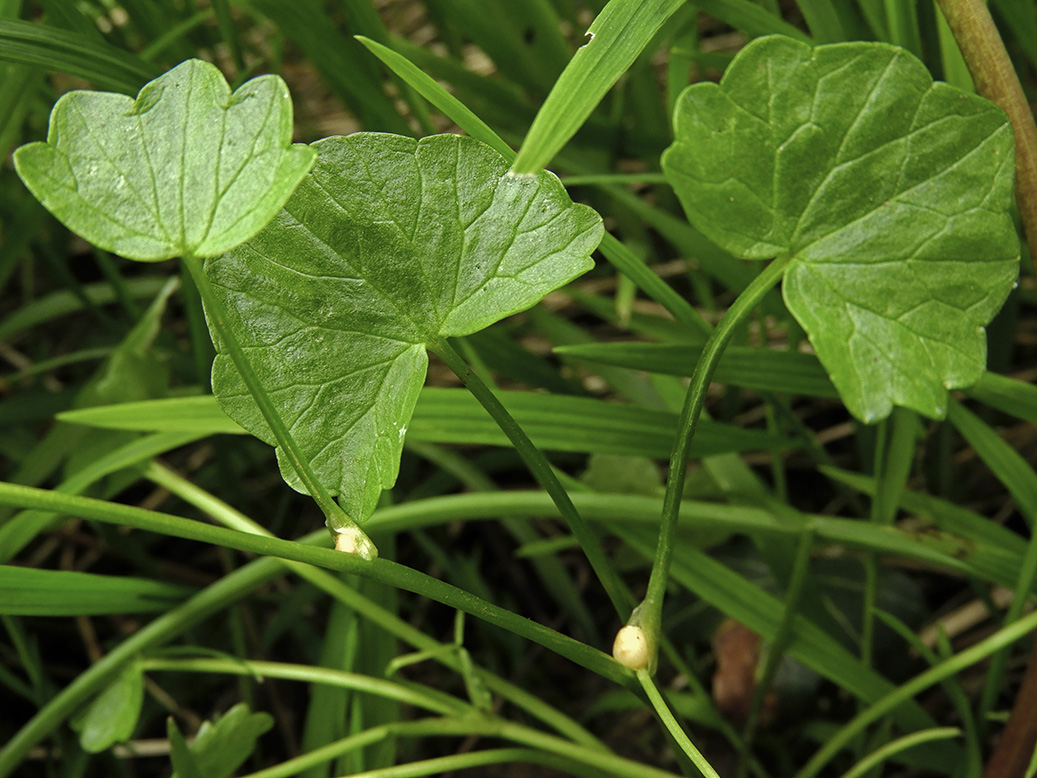
Ficaria verna

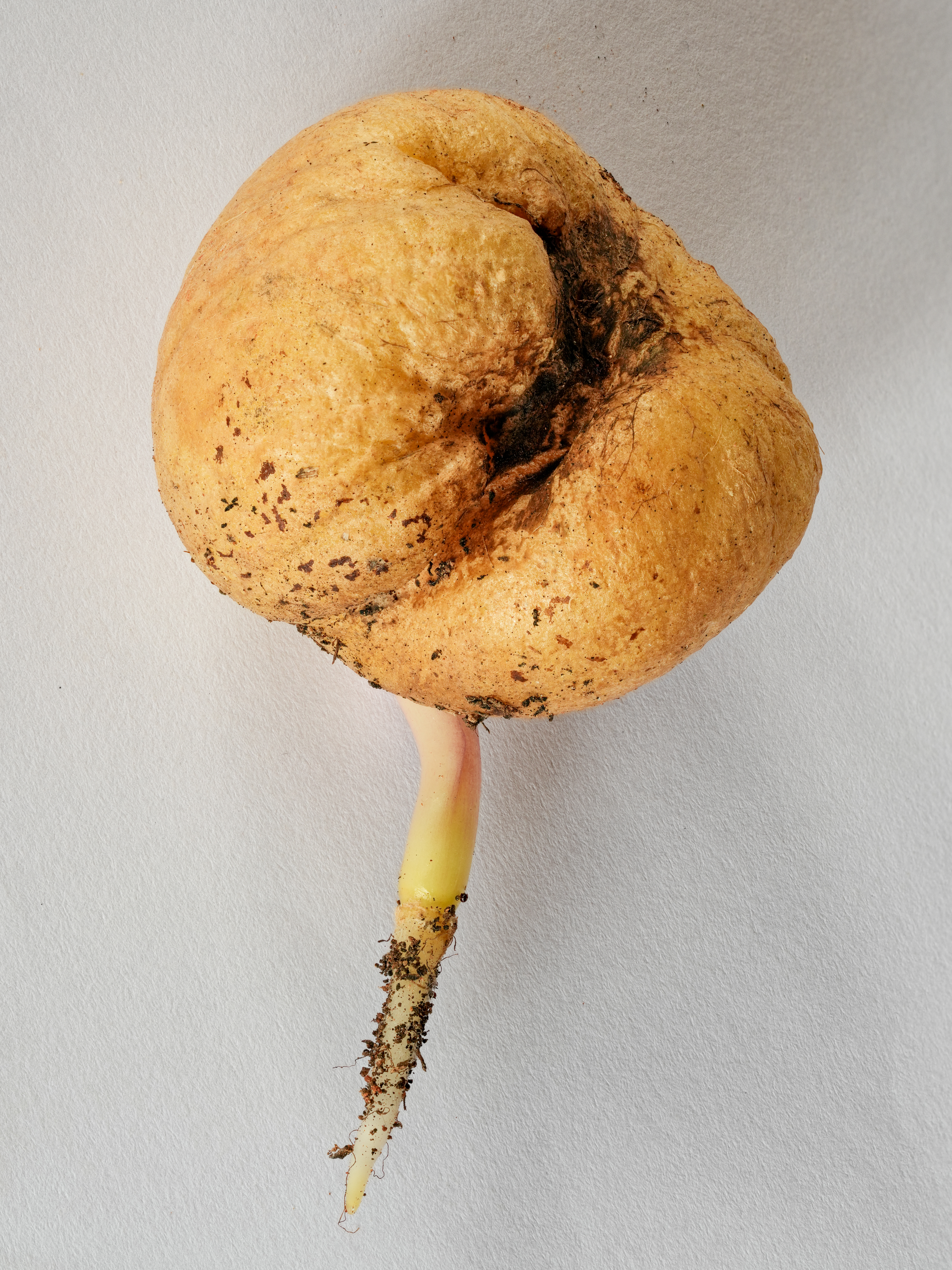
Bulbil of Crinum moorei germinating

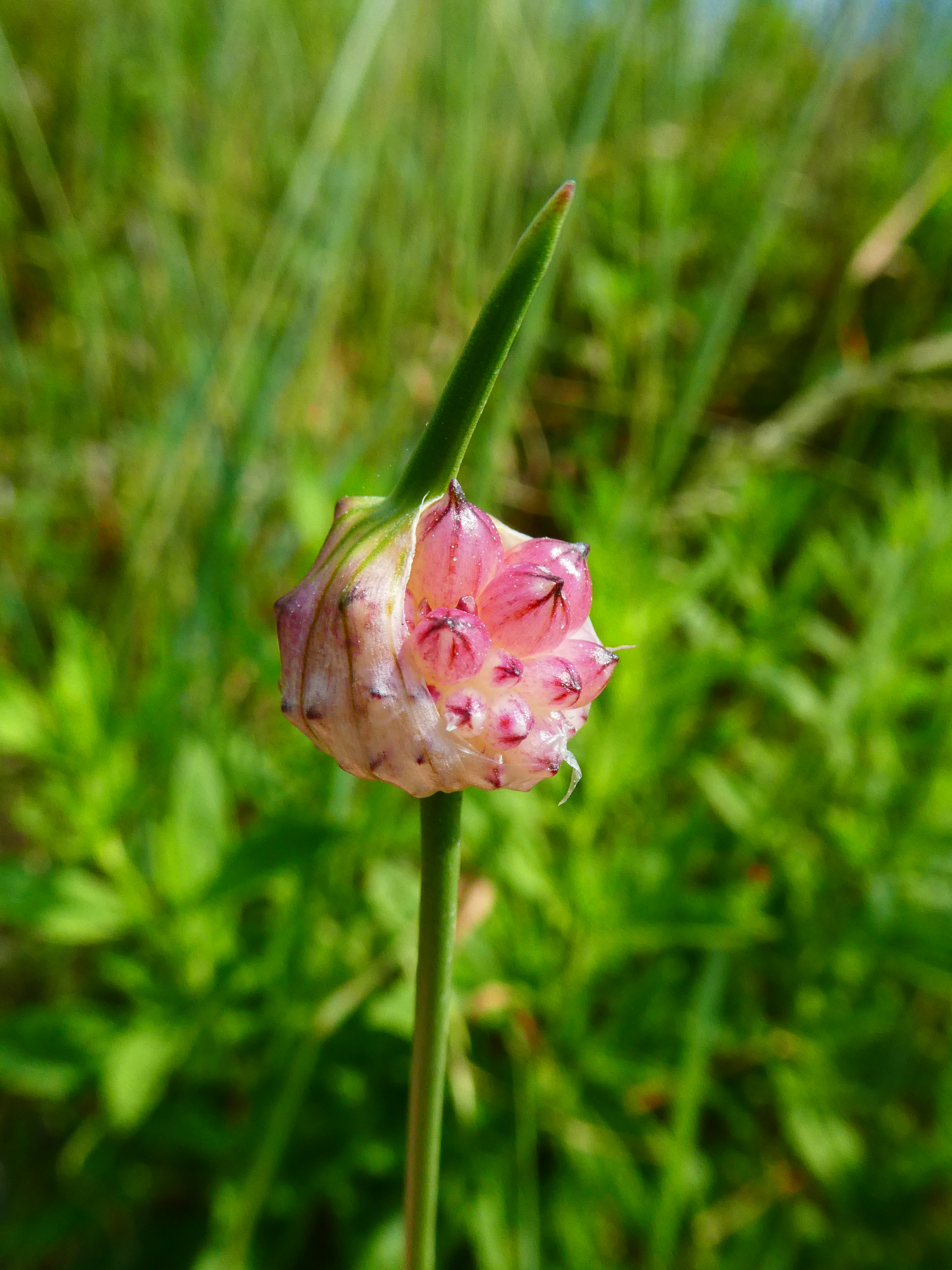
Allium vineale

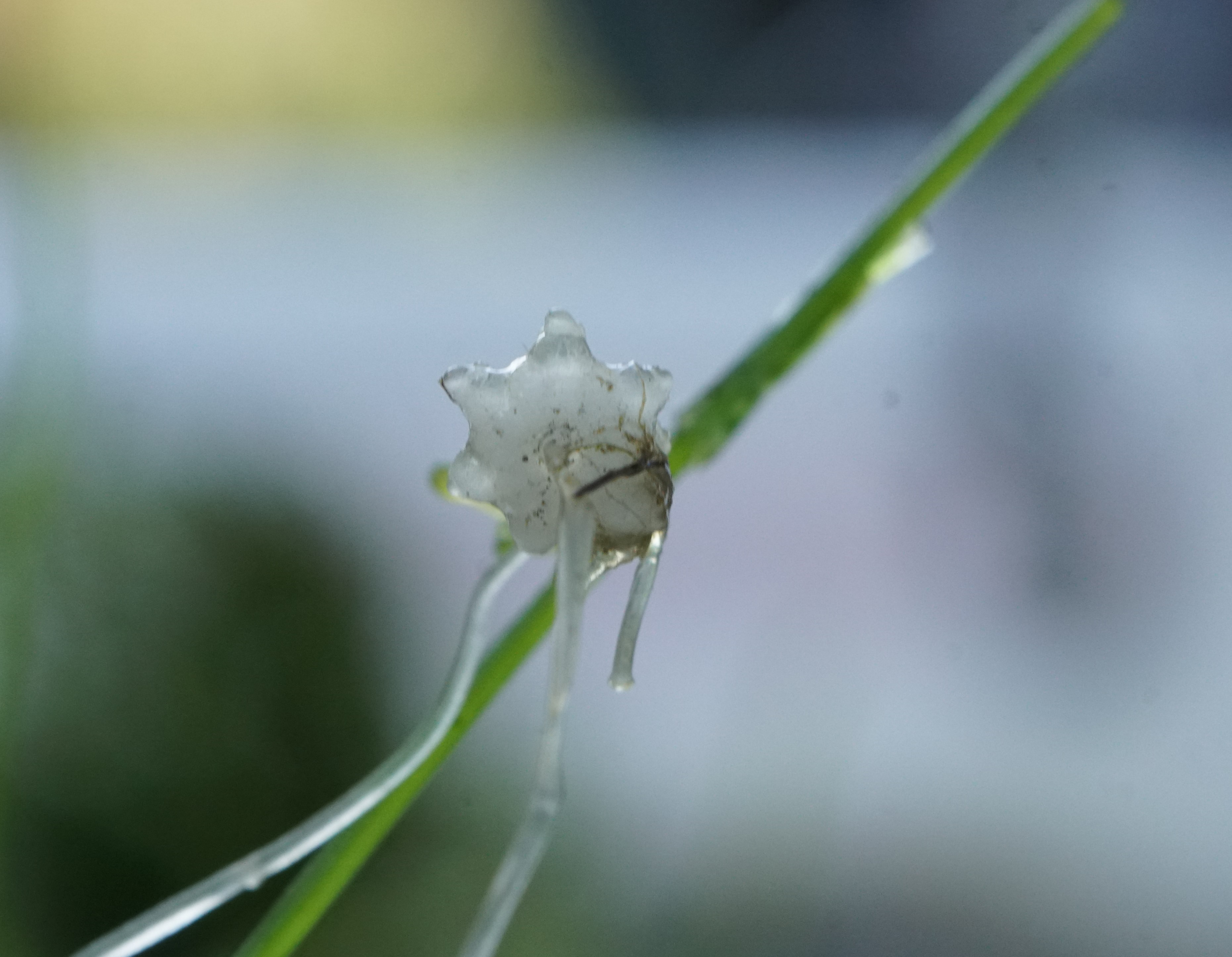
Nitellopsis obtusa forming "pseudobulbils"

A bulbil (also referred to as a bulbel, bulblet, and/or pup) is a small, young plant that is reproduced vegetatively from axillary buds on the parent plant's stem or in place of a flower on an inflorescence. These young plants are clones of the parent plant that produced them—they have identical genetic material. The formation of bulbils is a form of asexual reproduction, as they can eventually go on to form new stand-alone plants.

Although some bulbils meet the botanical criterion to be considered a true bulb, there are a variety of different morphological forms of bulbils, some of which are not considered to be bulbs. Hence the reason for distinction between bulbs and bulbils. For example, some bulbous plant groups, like onions and lilies, produce bulbils in the form of a secondary, small bulb. Onion and lily bulbils meet the botanical criterion to be labeled a true bulb. All bulbils produced by bulbous plants are to be considered bulbs, but not all bulbils are to be considered bulbs. For example, other non-bulbous plant groups, like various genera within the subfamily Agavoideae, are well known to produce bulbils that do not actually meet the botanical criterion to be considered a bulb.

== Bulbils in Agavoideae ==
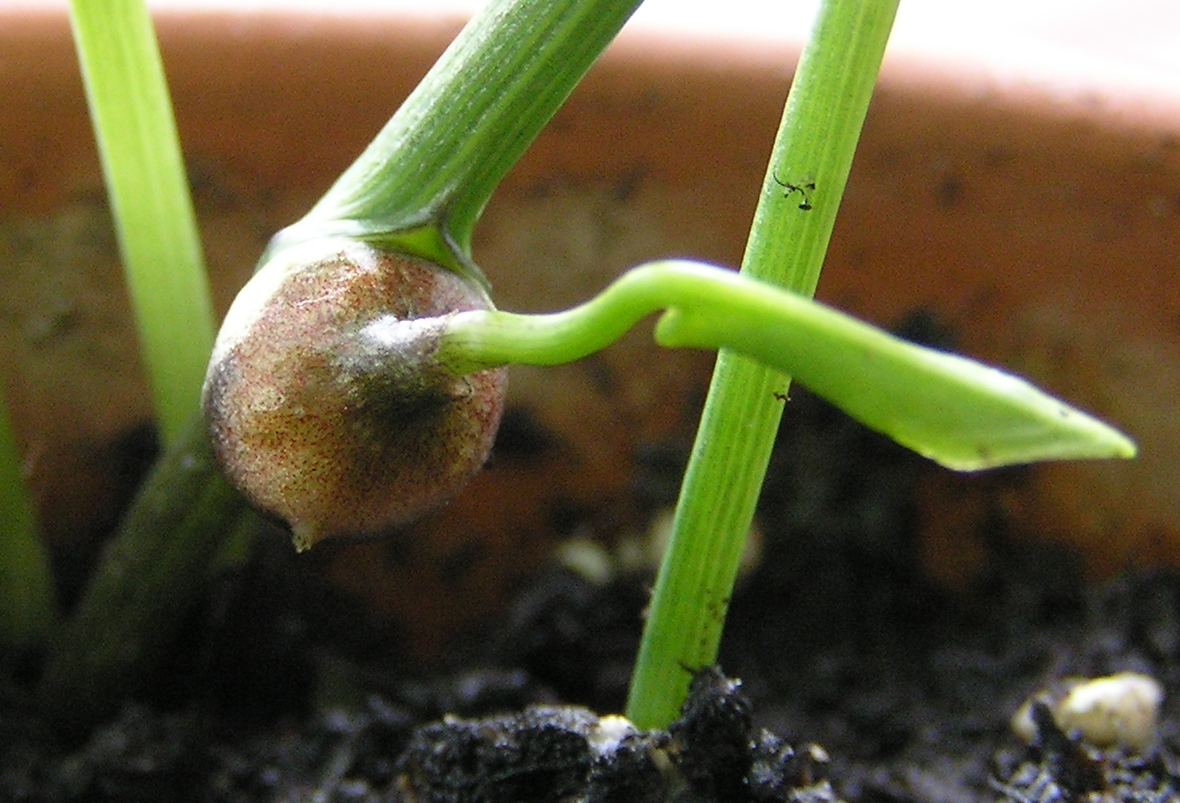
Pinellia ternata

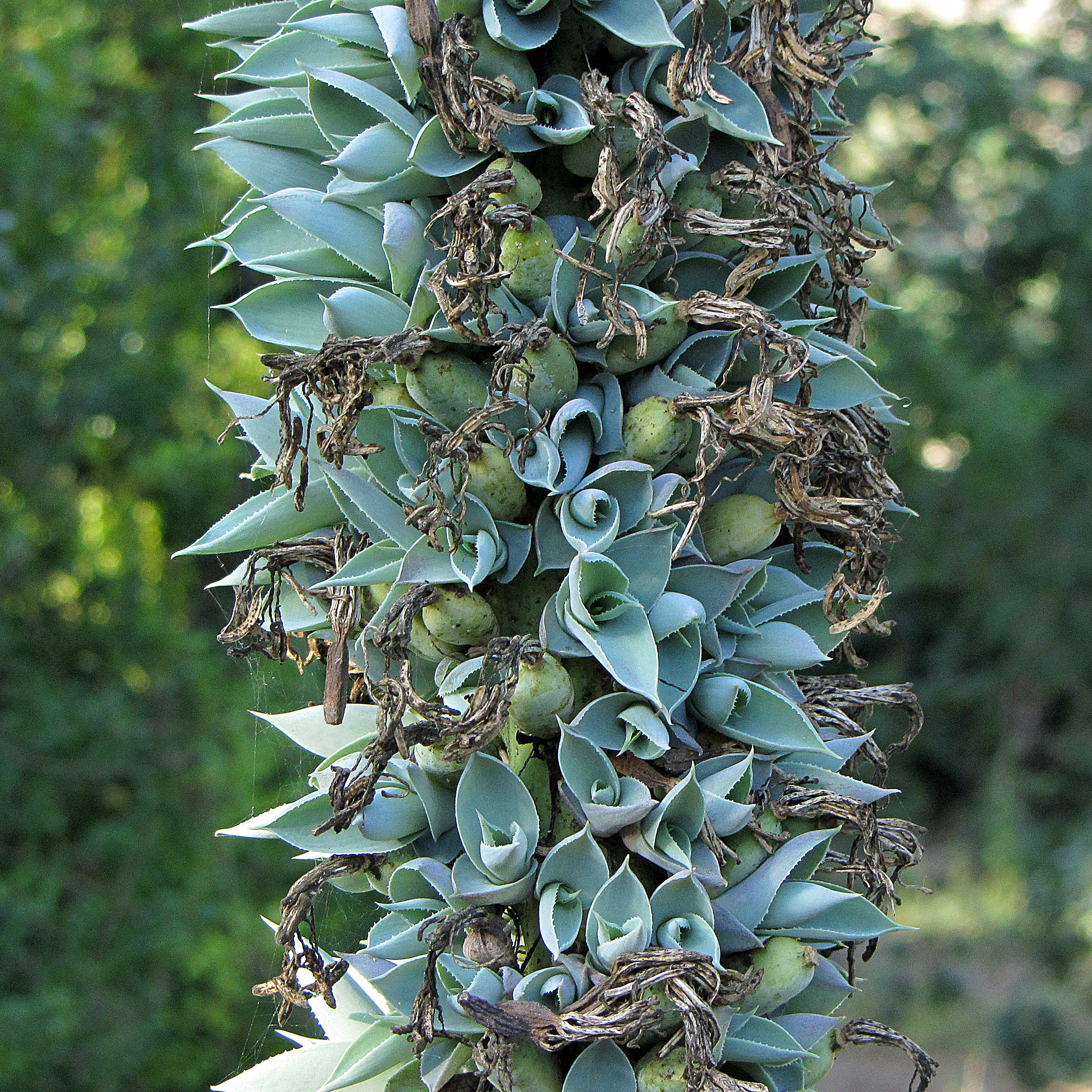
Bulbils on Agave vilmoriniana

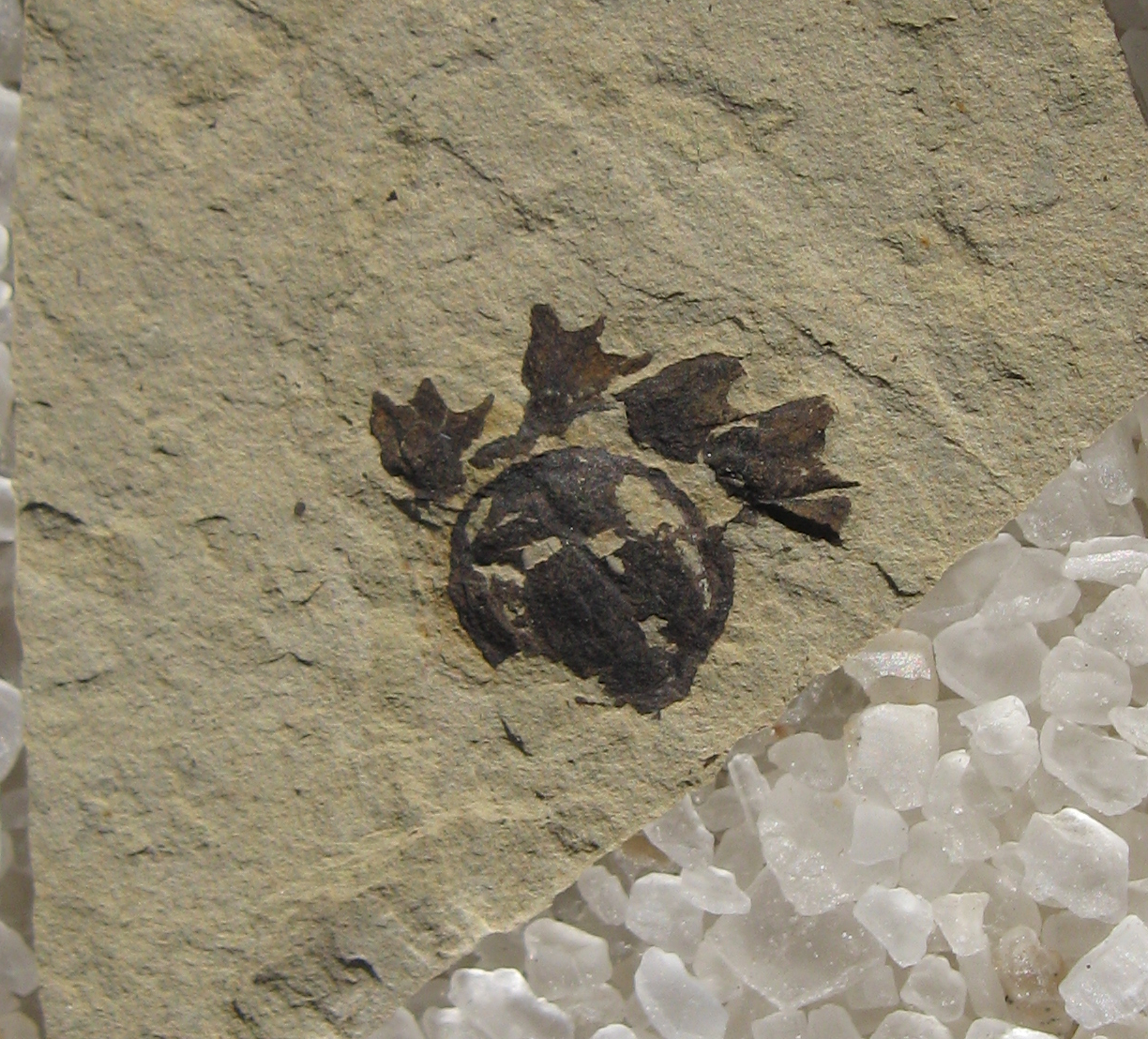
Paleoallium billgenseli bulbil with flowers

Within Agavoideae, bulbils develop on the inflorescence of a blooming plant. The development of bulbils in this group is common in approximately 17 Agave species, all Furcraea species, and has been somewhat documented in Yucca (particularly Yucca elata), and Hesperaloe. Bulbils can develop quite quickly, many do so after the flowers die, and can persist on the inflorescence for around one to two years before falling to root in the ground. While still on the parent plant, many species develop adventitious roots and can grow to sizes ranging from 5 to 15 centimeters, if left to mature.

== Examples ==
- Aconitum columbianum ssp. viviparum
- Agave
- Allium vineale
- Allium paradoxum
- Allium × proliferum (tree onion)
- Allium sativum (garlic)
- Amorphophallus bulbifer
- Asplenium bulbiferum
- Bistorta vivipara
- Cardamine bulbifera
- Cicuta bulbifera
- Claytonia sibirica L. var. bulbifera
- Costus spiral
- Cynorkis uncata
- Cystopteris bulbifera
- Cyperus alternifolius
- Cyperus dentatus
- Dentaria bulbifera
- Dodecatheon hendersonii A. Gray ssp. hendersonii
- Dioscorea bulbifera
- Dioscorea polystachya
- Eleocharis vivipara
- Ficaria verna ssp. bulbifera
- Furcraea hexapetala
- Homeria breyniana
- Kalanchoe daigremontiana
- Lithophragma glabrum
- Leskeaceae nervosa Myr. var. bulbifera
- Lilium bulbiferum
- Lilium lancifolium
- Lysimachia terrestris
- Oxalis inaequalis
- Pinellia ternata
- Saxifraga cernua
- Woodwardia radicans

== See also ==
- Propagule
