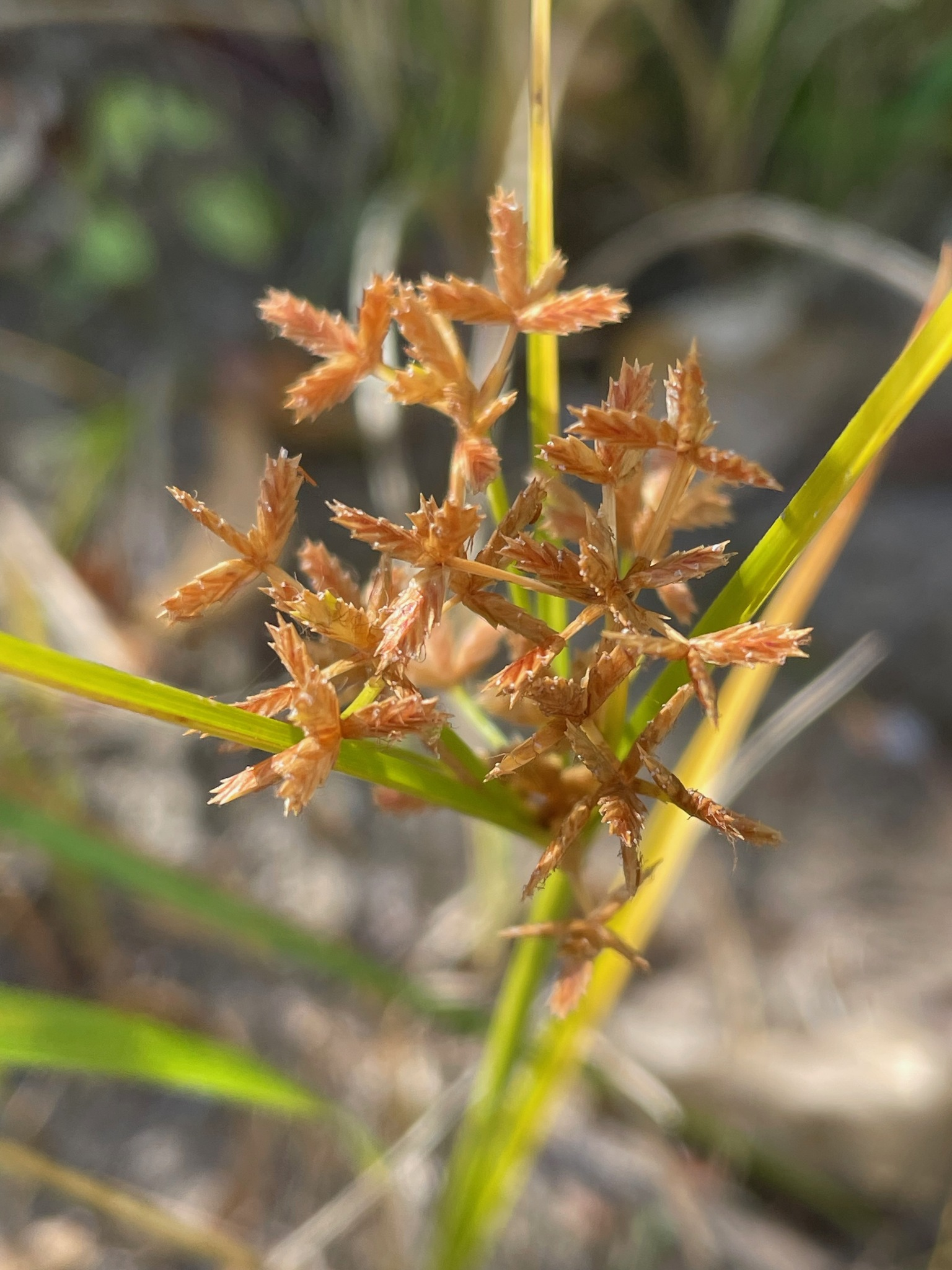
- Alburgh Dunes State Park (Vermont, USA)

Conservation status
- Apparently Secure (NatureServe)

Scientific classification
- Kingdom: Plantae
- Clade: Tracheophytes
- Clade: Angiosperms
- Clade: Monocots
- Clade: Commelinids
- Order: Poales
- Family: Cyperaceae
- Genus: Cyperus
- Species: C. dentatus

Binomial name
- Cyperus dentatus Torr.

Synonyms
- Heterotypic synonyms: Cyperus dentatus var. ctenostachys Fernald; Cyperus dentatus f. ctenostachys (Fernald) Fernald; Cyperus micranthus Schult.; Cyperus parviflorus Muhl.; Cyperus watsonianus Boeckeler

= Cyperus dentatus =

Species of sedge

Cyperus dentatus, also known as toothed flatsedge, is a species of flowering plant in the sedge family Cyperaceae. It is native to eastern North America, from Nova Scotia in Canada southward to Virginia in the United States. Disjunct populations occur in western Virginia, southeastern Tennessee, and northwestern Indiana south of Lake Michigan. In the early 19th century, botanists formally described the species based on plants found on the banks of the Susquehanna River in Pennsylvania, in the pine barrens of New Jersey, and in New England. Its range was once thought to extend into the southern U.S. states of Georgia, South Carolina, and North Carolina but some botanists believe these reports may actually be based on Cyperus lecontei, a close look-alike.

The floral structures of Cyperus dentatus are said to be dentate, which means "having teeth". Both the scientific name and the common name emphasize this fact. It often produces bulb-like structures called bulblets. If a bulblet takes root, a clone of the parent plant is formed. A plant with bulblets is distinctive, so much so that Henry David Thoreau referred to the species as bulblet sedge in 1859.

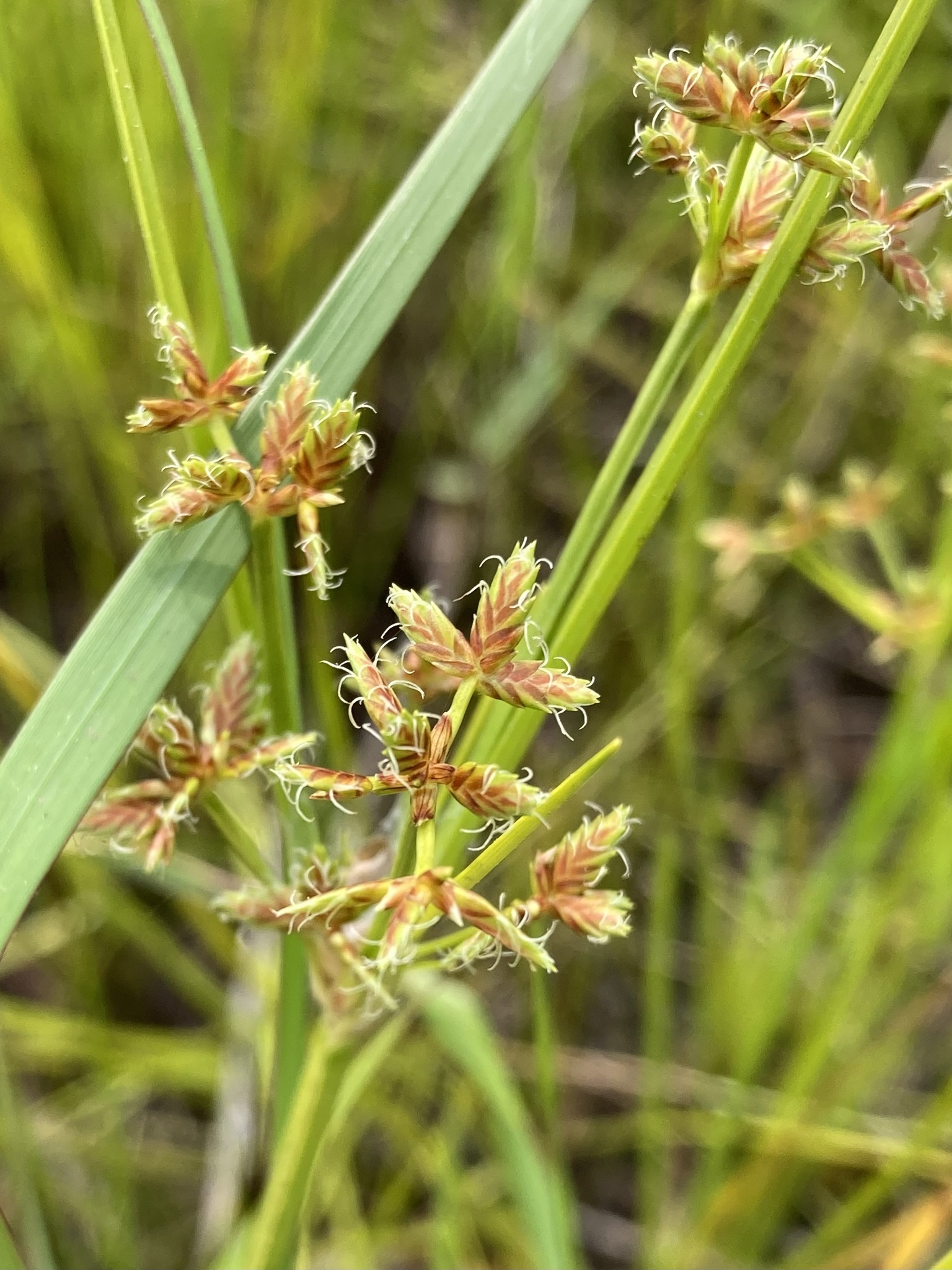
Flowers with stigmas in Burlington County, New Jersey in June

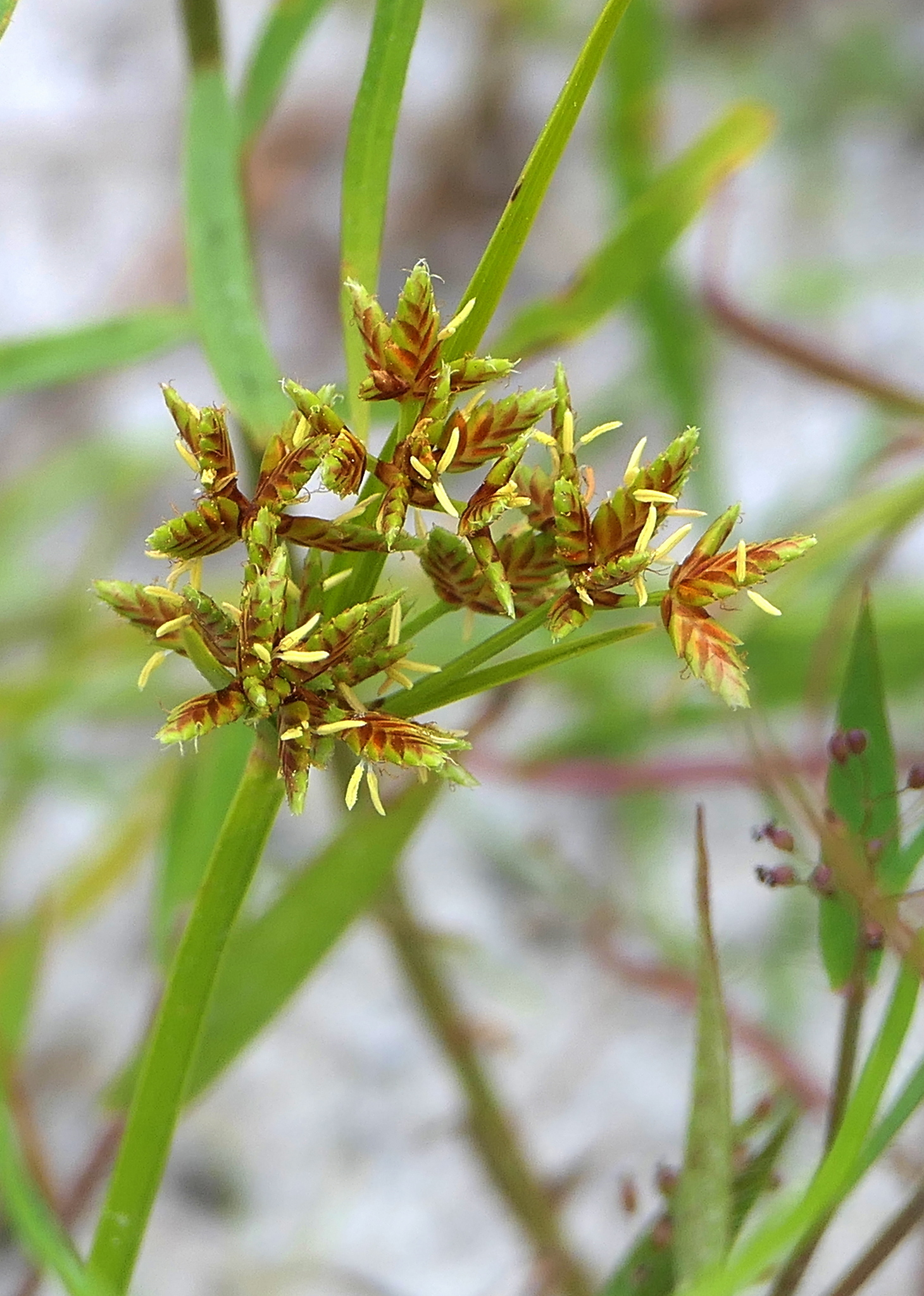
Flowers with anthers in Plymouth County, Massachusetts in July

== Description ==
Cyperus dentatus is a perennial, herbaceous sedge that persists via a creeping rhizome with small tubers terminating the branches of the rootstalk. Its inflorescence bears clusters of spikelets, each with numerous florets. Each floret is covered by a scale, which is a type of bract in sedges and grasses. In addition to spikelets, plants often produce vegetative propagules called bulblets. These are unlike spikelets in appearance, and therefore a plant with bulblets is distinctive and readily identified. In 1859, the American naturalist Henry David Thoreau referred to this species as bulblet sedge, describing it as "a plant and color looking toward autumn".

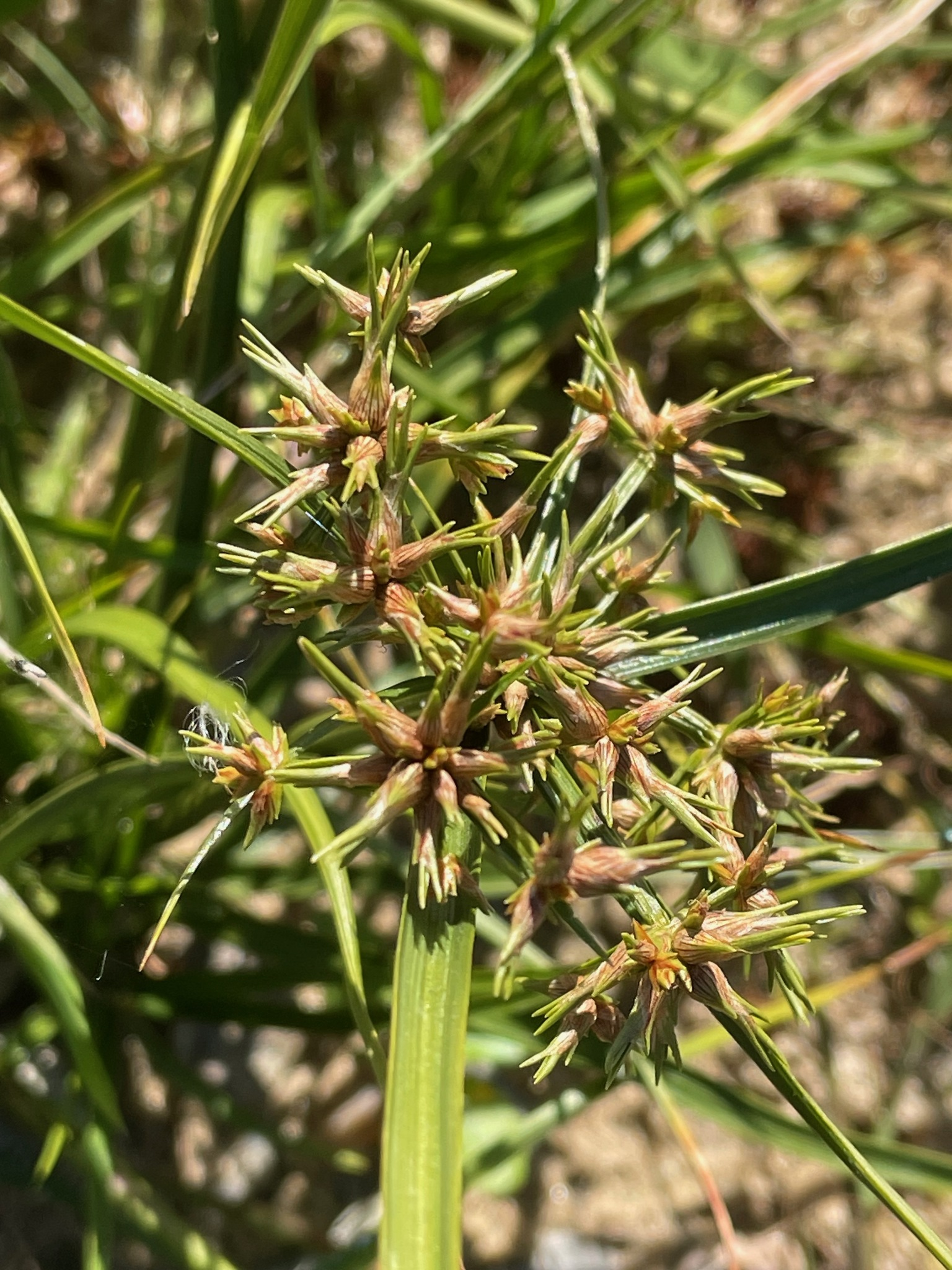
With bulblets in Grand Isle County, Vermont in October

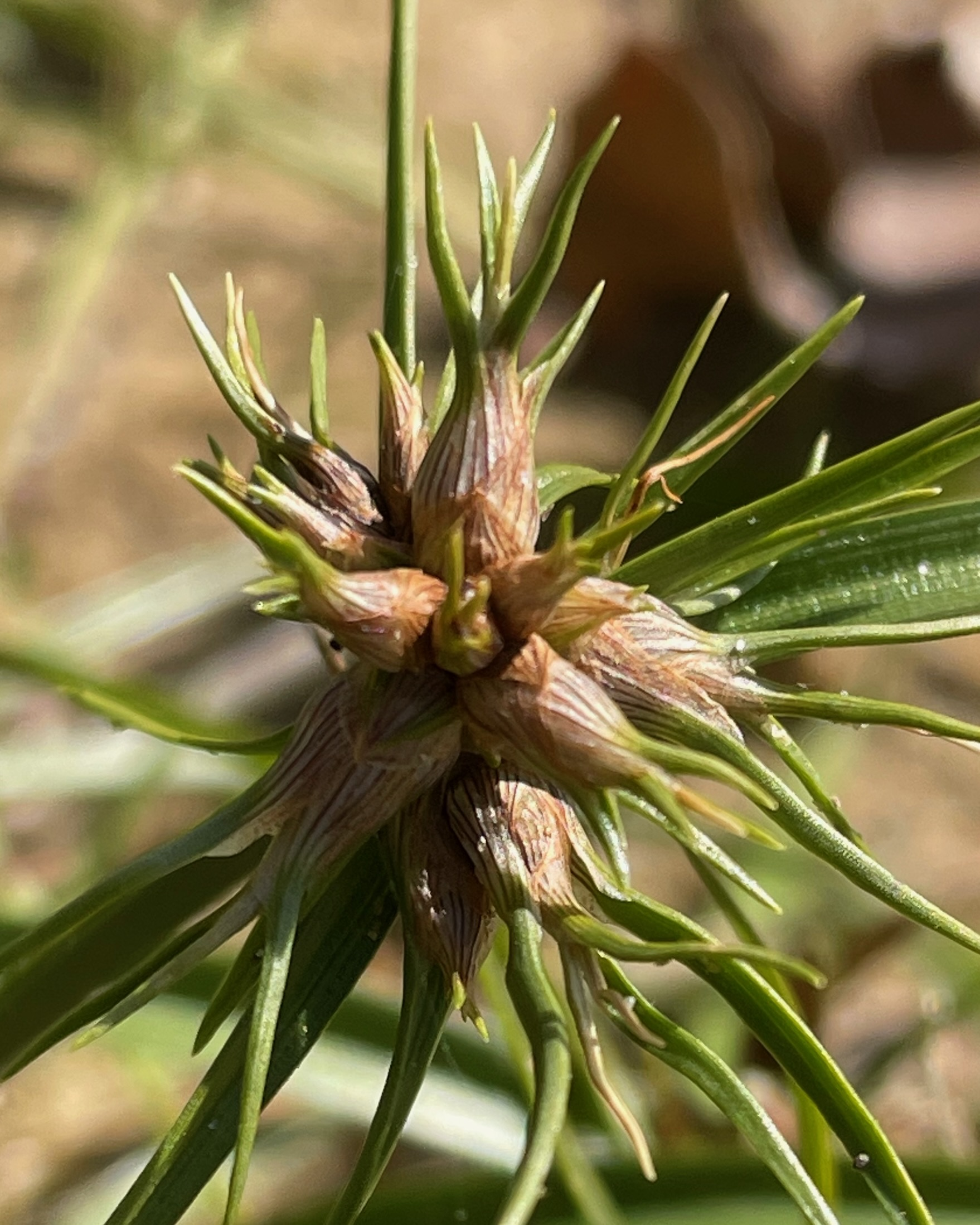
Close-up of bulblets

The first description of Cyperus dentatus was published in 1817. It was also described (in English) by the American botanist John Torrey in 1823, and again in 1836. Torrey described "this beautiful species" as follows:

- Stem about one foot long, leafy at the base, leaves shorter than the stem
- Inflorescence is a compound umbel with 4–7 primary rays of unequal length
- Three (3) leaf-like bracts at the base of the inflorescence
- A cluster of 3–5 compressed spikelets terminates each secondary ray of the inflorescence
- Each spikelet has 6–30 florets covered by scales with acute tips (less than 90 degrees)

A more detailed description was published in Flora of North America in 2002. Cyperus dentatus has stems 8–50 cm (3–20 in) long. It is leafy at the base, with leaves 10–40 cm (4–16 in) long and 2–5 mm wide. The inflorescence is a compound umbel with 4–10 primary rays of unequal length, each ray up to 8 cm (3 in) long. There are 3–5 leaf-like bracts at the base of the inflorescence, at least one of which is longer than the primary rays of the umbel. A cluster of 2–6 compressed spikelets terminates each secondary ray of the inflorescence. Each spikelet has 3–20(–50) florets covered by reddish brown scales with prominent tips. Each floret is bisexual with three anthers and a single style with three branched stigmas. The anthers and stigmas emerge from the axil of the floral scale but a perianth is absent. The fruit is an achene up to 1 mm long. 2n = 34.

Cyperus dentatus is similar in appearance to Cyperus lecontei, a species known to occur in the southeastern United States. In the southeastern U.S. states of Georgia, South Carolina, and North Carolina, plant specimens of Cyperus lecontei may have been misidentified, which has led to confusion regarding the distribution of Cyperus dentatus.

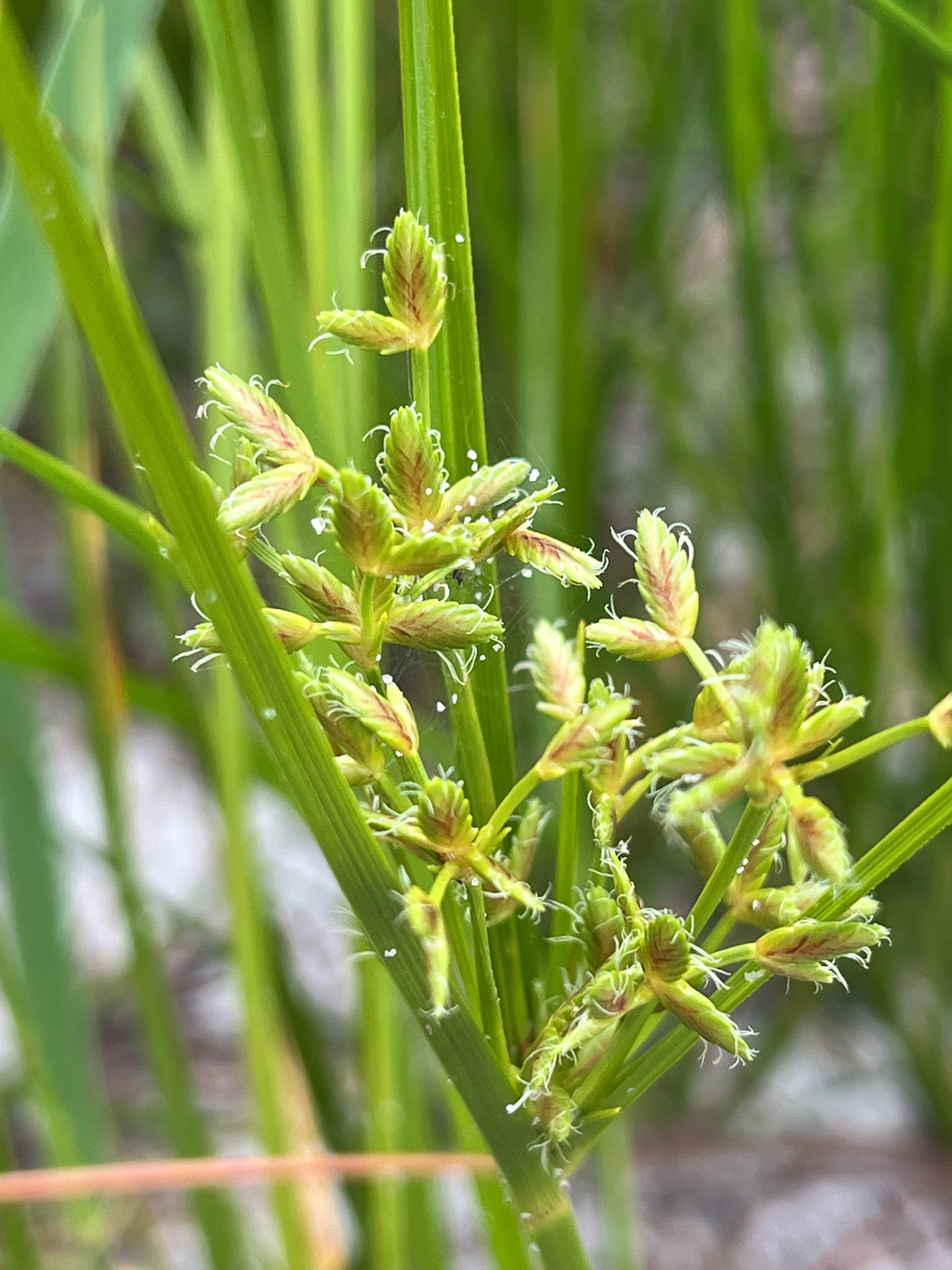
Cyperus lecontei in Clay County, Florida in May, sometimes confused with Cyperus dentatus

== Taxonomy ==
Cyperus dentatus was first described as Cyperus parviflorus by the American botanist Gotthilf Heinrich Ernst Muhlenberg in 1817. At the time, Muhlenberg was unaware that the name Cyperus parviflorus had been previously published in 1805, and so the name Cyperus parviflorus Muhl. is illegitimate. As a replacement name, the American botanist John Torrey described Cyperus dentatus in 1823. Torrey referred to the species as the "toothed galingale". As of January 2026, the botanical name Cyperus dentatus Torr. is widely accepted.

In his description of Cyperus dentatus, Torrey acknowledged Muhlenberg's contribution by including an English translation of the original description published in 1817. Torrey also noted that the spikelets appeared "dentate or pectinate by the spreading of the points of the glumes when old". The specific epithet dentatus, which means "having teeth", refers to the prominent tips of the floral scales (glumes) described by Torrey. This feature gives the inflorescence a jagged or toothed appearance.

=== Synonymy ===
In 1836, Torrey described the variety Cyperus dentatus var. multiradiatus based on specimens collected in the southern U.S. states of Florida and Louisiana. Torrey noted that the taxon might be a distinct species, in which case he proposed the name Cyperus lecontei in honor of the American naturalist John Eatton Le Conte who had previously collected the type specimen in eastern Florida. Subsequently Cyperus lecontei was described by the German botanist Ernst Gottlieb Steudel in 1854. As of January 2026, the name Cyperus dentatus var. multiradiatus Torr. is considered to be a homotypic synonym of Cyperus lecontei Torr. ex Steud. These facts help to explain why the distribution of Cyperus dentatus was once thought to extend into the southern U.S. states of Georgia, South Carolina, and North Carolina.

In 1906, the American botanist Merritt Lyndon Fernald described a variety of Cyperus dentatus based on specimens collected in the northern U.S. states of Massachusetts and New Jersey. The specimens had 15-40 florets per spikelet and glumes with less prominent tips. Fernald himself reduced the variety to a form in 1940. As of January 2026, both Cyperus dentatus var. ctenostachys Fernald and Cyperus dentatus f. ctenostachys (Fernald) Fernald are considered to be synonyms of Cyperus dentatus Torr.

=== Hybrid ===
Cyperus dentatus and Rhynchospora capitellata are the parents of an intergeneric hybrid described by Fernald in 1918. The hybrid has slender spikelets like those of a Cyperus and glumes with prominent tips as in Cyperus dentatus. As of January 2026, the hybrid name Cyperus × weatherbianus Fernald is unplaced.

== Distribution and habitat ==
Cyperus dentatus is native to southeastern Canada and eastern United States.

- Canada: New Brunswick, Nova Scotia, Ontario, Quebec
- United States: Connecticut, Delaware, District of Columbia, Indiana, Maine, Maryland, Massachusetts, New Hampshire, New Jersey, New York, Pennsylvania, Rhode Island, Tennessee, Vermont, Virginia

Plant specimens have been collected as far south as the coastal plain of Alabama, but some authorities claim the species has not naturalized there. Reports from the southern U.S. states of Georgia, South Carolina, and North Carolina may actually be based on Cyperus lecontei, not Cyperus dentatus.

Cyperus dentatus prefers sandy or gravelly shorelines and coastlines. It is commonly found throughout the Atlantic coastal pine barrens, an ecoregion known for its sandy, nutrient-poor soil. One of the original specimens of Cyperus dentatus was collected in the New Jersey Pine Barrens in the early 19th century. In Virginia, its habitat is restricted to acidic sinkhole ponds in the Shenandoah Valley west of the Blue Ridge in Augusta County.

== Ecology ==
Cyperus dentatus is a flowering plant whose season runs from July to October. Flowering occurs during the months of July and August while fruiting occurs from August to October. It also reproduces asexually by means of bulblets, tubers, and rhizomes. Bulblets are often seen in the presence of fruits but it is not uncommon to find plants with bulblets only (no fruits), especially in September when bulblet production is at its peak. In Quebec and Vermont where the species is uncommon, populations that were unable to produce viable seed, instead produced bulblets that were successfully germinated in the laboratory.

== Conservation ==
As of January 2026, the global conservation status of Cyperus dentatus is apparently secure (G4). However, it is critically imperiled (S1) in Ontario, Indiana, Tennessee, and Virginia. It is possibly extirpated (SH) in Delaware, District of Columbia, Maryland, and North Carolina (but other sources suggest that Cyperus dentatus is not native in North Carolina).

== See also ==
- List of Cyperus species
- Glossary of botanical terms
- Plant reproductive morphology
- Dichogamy in flowering plants
- Anemophily
- Vivipary
- Bulb#Bulbil
- Ochrea

== Bibliography ==
- Aldous, Allison (1994). Phenotypic plasticity in three species of Cyperus with contrasting mating systems (MSc thesis). Montréal: McGill University.
- Belden, Allen Jr. (1992). "Virginia's Rarest Plants: Cyperus dentatus, Toothed Sedge" (PDF). Bulletin of the Virginia Native Plant Society. 11 (4): 4.
- Fernald, M. L. (1918). "An intergeneric hybrid in the Cyperaceae". Rhodora. 20 (239): 189–191.
- Gledhill, David (2008). The Names of Plants (4th ed.). Cambridge University Press. ISBN 978-0-521-86645-3.
- Muhlenberg, Gotthilf Heinrich Ernst (1817). Descriptio uberior graminum et plantarum calamariarum Americae septentrionalis indigenarum et cicurum. Philadelphiae: Conrad.
- Steudel, Ernst Gottlieb (1855). Synopsis Plantarum Glumacearum. Stuttgartaiae: J. B. Metzler.
- Thoreau, Henry David (2016). Wisner, Geoff (ed.). Thoreau's Wildflowers. Illustrated by Barry Moser. New Haven and London: Yale University Press. p. 150. ISBN 978-0-300-21477-2.
- Torrey, John (1824). A flora of the northern and middle sections of the United States. Vol. 1. New York: Swords.
- Torrey, John (1836). "Monograph of the North American Cyperaceae". Annals of the Lyceum of Natural History of New York. 3: 239–448.
- Torrey, John (1843). Flora of the State of New York. Vol. 2. Albany: Carroll and Cook.
- Tucker, G. C. (1987). "The genera of Cyperaceae in the southeastern United States". Journal of the Arnold Arboretum. 68 (4): 361–445. JSTOR 43782578.
