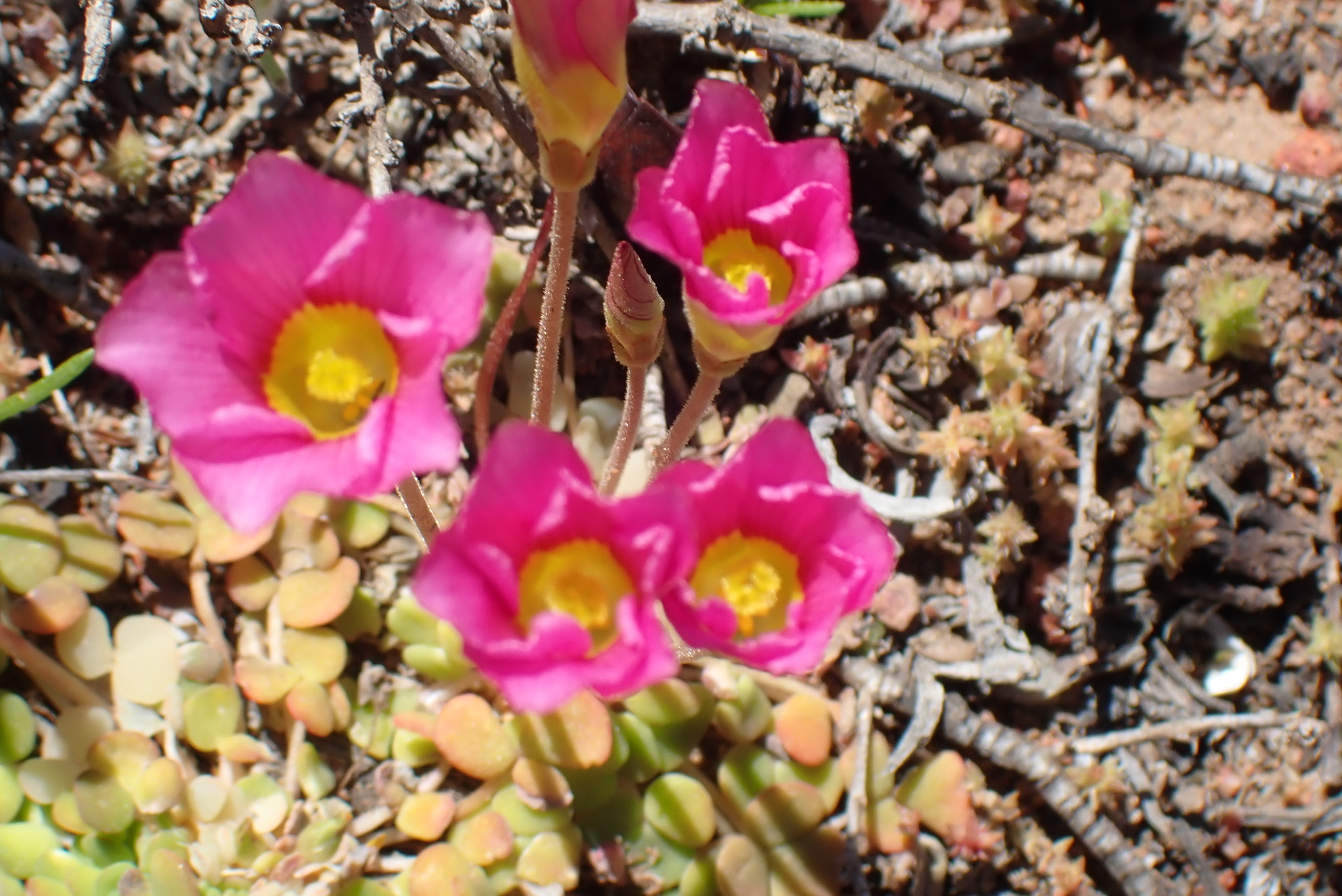

Conservation status
- Least Concern (IUCN 3.1)

Scientific classification
- Kingdom: Plantae
- Clade: Tracheophytes
- Clade: Angiosperms
- Clade: Eudicots
- Clade: Rosids
- Order: Oxalidales
- Family: Oxalidaceae
- Genus: Oxalis
- Species: O. inaequalis

Binomial name
- Oxalis inaequalis Weintroub

= Oxalis inaequalis =

Species of flowering plant

Oxalis inaequalis is a bulb-forming species of flowering plant in the wood sorrel family. It is native to South Africa's Cape Provinces. Each plant produces a rosette of up to 70 succulent leaves, which occasionally produce aerial bulbs. The flowers are yellow and copper-coloured. The sepals are of unequal sizes, hence the specific epithet "inaequalis", which is Latin for "unequal".

== See also ==
- List of Latin and Greek words commonly used in systematic names
