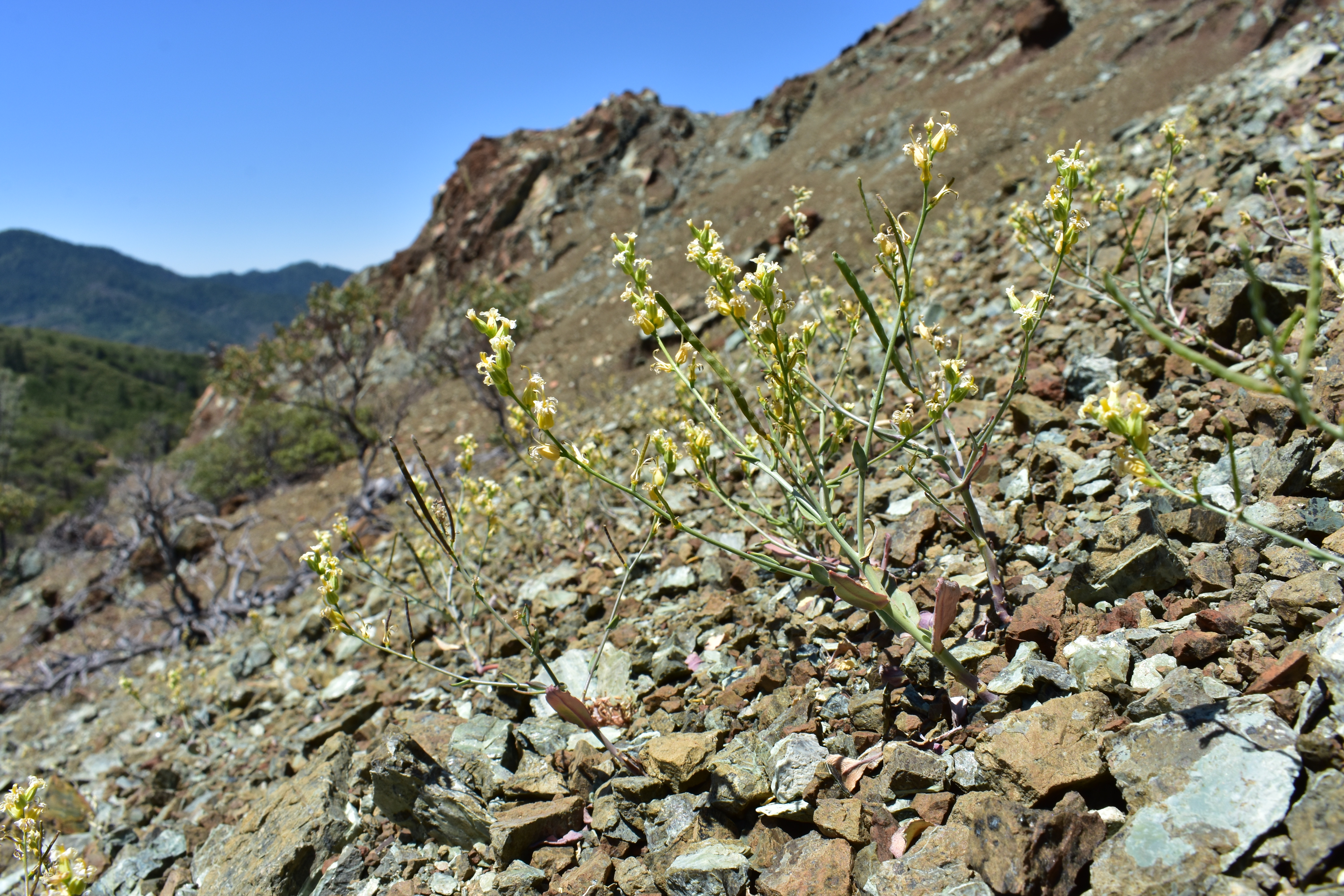

Conservation status
- Critically Imperiled (NatureServe)

Scientific classification
- Kingdom: Plantae
- Clade: Tracheophytes
- Clade: Angiosperms
- Clade: Eudicots
- Clade: Rosids
- Order: Brassicales
- Family: Brassicaceae
- Genus: Streptanthus
- Species: S. vernalis

Binomial name
- Streptanthus vernalis R.O'Donnell & R.W.Dolan

= Streptanthus vernalis =

Plant species in the mustard family

Streptanthus vernalis is a rare species of flowering plant in the mustard family known by the common name early jewelflower. It was first observed in the 1970s but not actually described to science until 2005. It is endemic to Lake County, California, where it is known from a single occurrence at Three Peaks near the Napa County line. It is apparently limited to serpentine outcrops in forested and chaparral habitat. Genetic analysis indicates that the species is distinct from other Streptanthus and is most closely related to Streptanthus morrisonii, which it resembles. It is a hairless annual herb producing an erect branching or unbranched stem 2 to 20 centimeters tall. The ephemeral basal leaves have thick, fleshy leaves which are green and unmottled on top and purple on the undersides. Leaves higher on the stem are linear to lance-shaped and lack petioles. Flowers occur at intervals along the upper stem. Each flower has an urn-shaped calyx of sepals which is solid green with no purple or yellowish tinge. The petals emerging from the tip are white without darker veining. The fruit is a flattened straight silique 3 to 5 centimeters long containing orange seeds.

== Taxonomy ==
The paper describing the species was published in 2005 by Richard O'Donnell and Rebecca Wilcox Dolan. They placed the species as a member of the Streptanthus genus in the Brassicaceae family. The species has no botanical synonyms.
