= Streptanthus fenestratus =

Conservation status
- Imperiled (NatureServe)

Scientific classification
- Kingdom: Plantae
- Clade: Embryophytes
- Clade: Tracheophytes
- Clade: Angiosperms
- Clade: Eudicots
- Clade: Rosids
- Order: Brassicales
- Family: Brassicaceae
- Genus: Streptanthus
- Species: S. fenestratus

Binomial name
- Streptanthus fenestratus (Greene) J.T.Howell

Species of flowering plant

Streptanthus fenestratus is an uncommon species of flowering plant in the mustard family known by the common name Tehipite Valley jewelflower.

== Distribution ==
It is endemic to Fresno County, California, where it is known only from the high mountain peaks of the Sierra Nevada in Kings Canyon National Park. It grows in coniferous forests. There are about ten populations.

== Description ==
Streptanthus fenestratus is an annual herb producing a hairless, waxy stem up 35 or 40 centimeters in maximum height. The basal leaves have blades divided into several lobes or leaflets. Leaves higher on the stem have oval or lance-shaped blades usually not subdivided. Flowers occur at intervals along the upper stem with one or two leaflike green or purple-tipped bracts at the base of the raceme. Each flower has a tubular urn-shaped calyx of purple sepals just under a centimeter long. Light petals up to 1.5 centimeters long emerge from the tip of the calyx. The fruit is a flat, narrow silique up to 5 centimeters long.

One of the main threats to this species is trampling by hikers.
