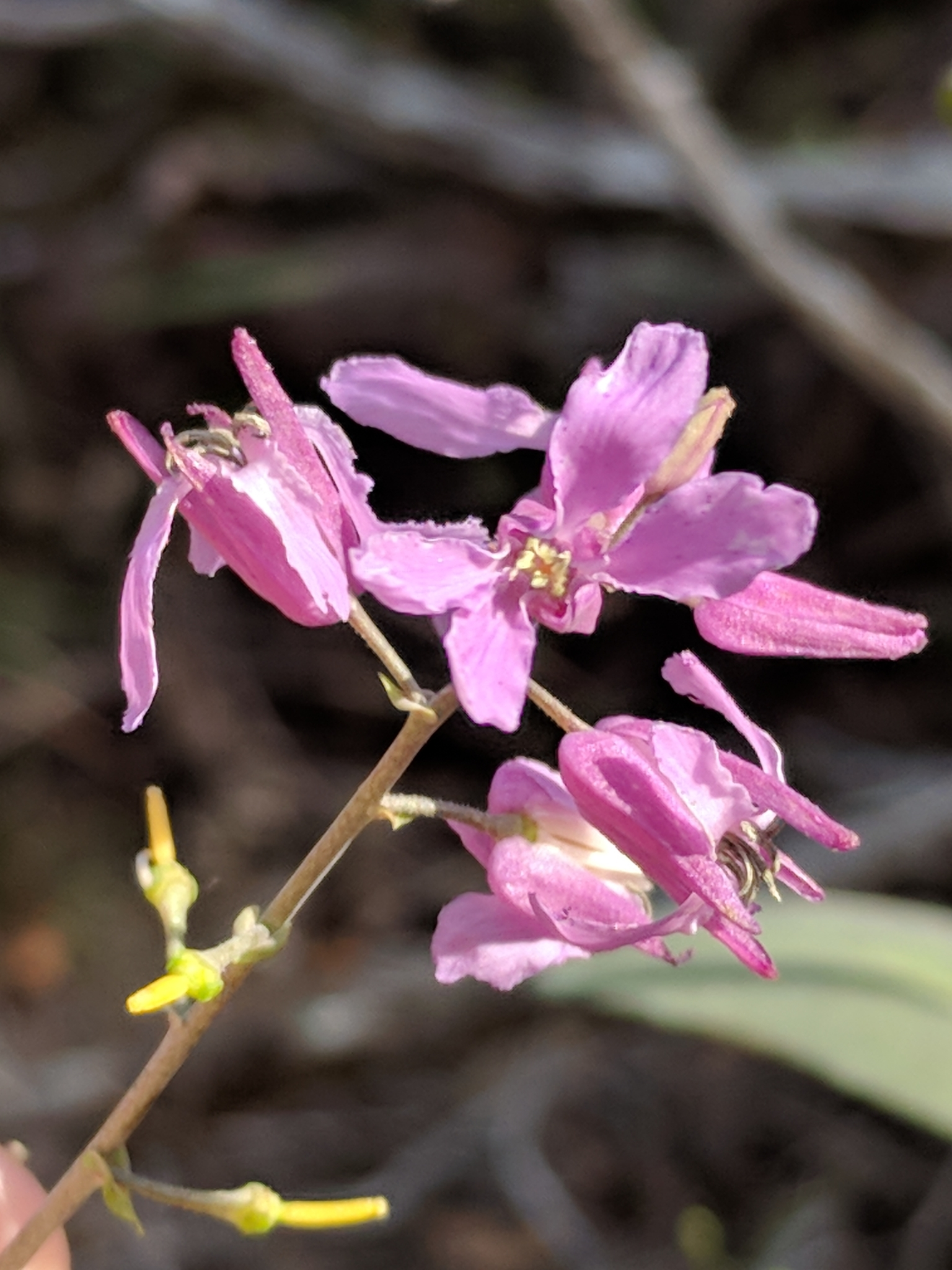
- S. bracteatus in Travis County, Texas, US

Conservation status
- Critically Imperiled (NatureServe)

Scientific classification
- Kingdom: Plantae
- Clade: Tracheophytes
- Clade: Angiosperms
- Clade: Eudicots
- Clade: Rosids
- Order: Brassicales
- Family: Brassicaceae
- Genus: Streptanthus
- Species: S. bracteatus

Binomial name
- Streptanthus bracteatus A.Gray

= Streptanthus bracteatus =

Species of flowering plant

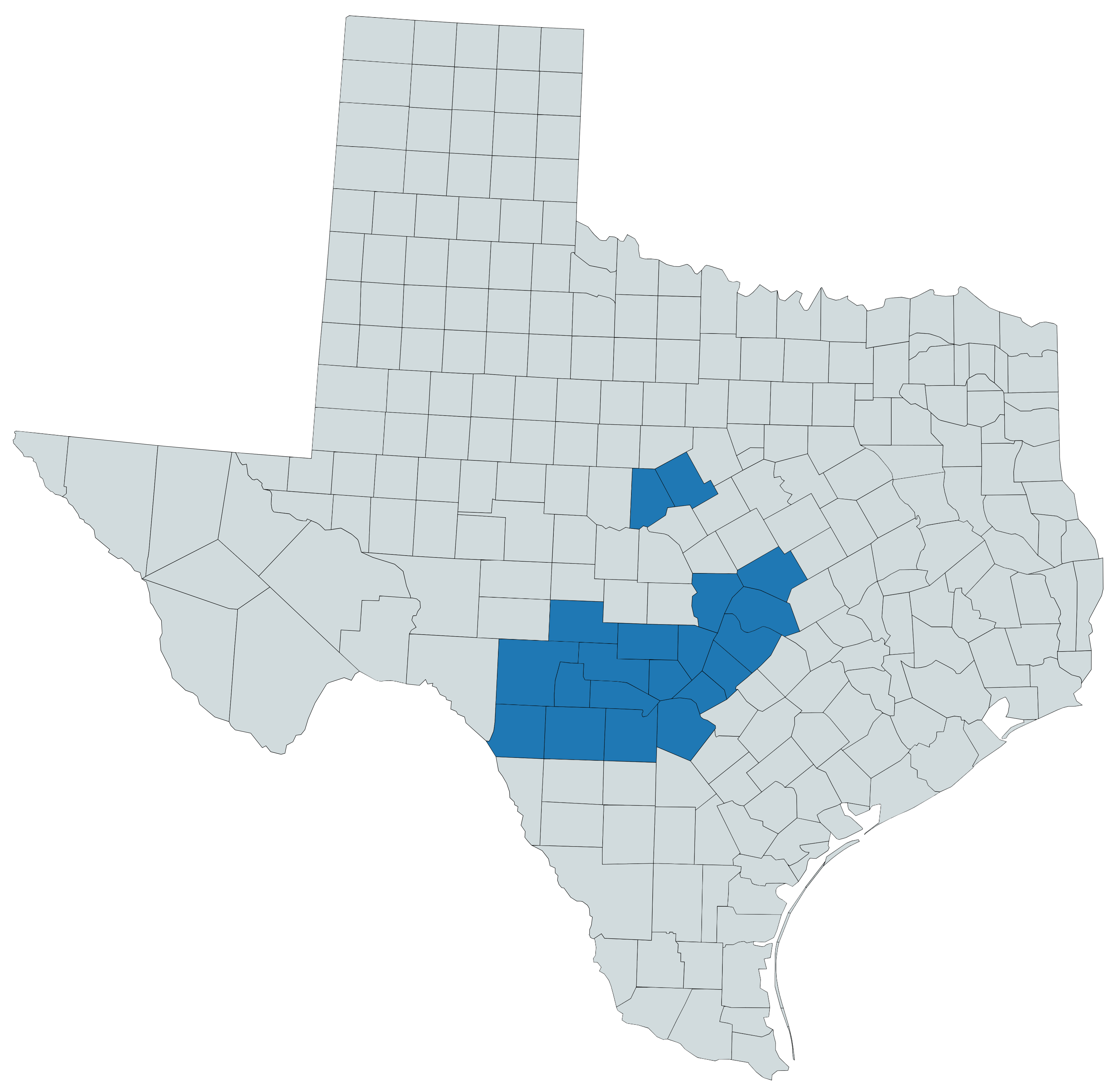
Range of Streptanthus bracteatus

Streptanthus bracteatus is a species of flowering plant in the mustard family known by the common names bracted jewelflower and bracted twistflower. It is endemic to Texas in the United States.

This annual or biennial herb has a branching stem up to 1.2 meters tall. It is hairless and generally waxy in texture. The basal leaves have lobed or toothed blades on long petioles, and the leaves higher on the stem have smooth or toothed edges. The inflorescence is a raceme of flowers and bracts. Each flower has a bell-shaped calyx of sepals and four purple petals which may be nearly 2 centimeters long. The fruit is a long, flattened silique up to 14.5 centimeters in length.

This plant is native to the Balcones Escarpment on the Edwards Plateau in Texas. It grows on clay soils in several habitat types. It may be found in areas where it is protected from herbivory by a dense layer of shrubs. The U.S. Fish and Wildlife Service has declared the bracted twistflower a threatened species.
