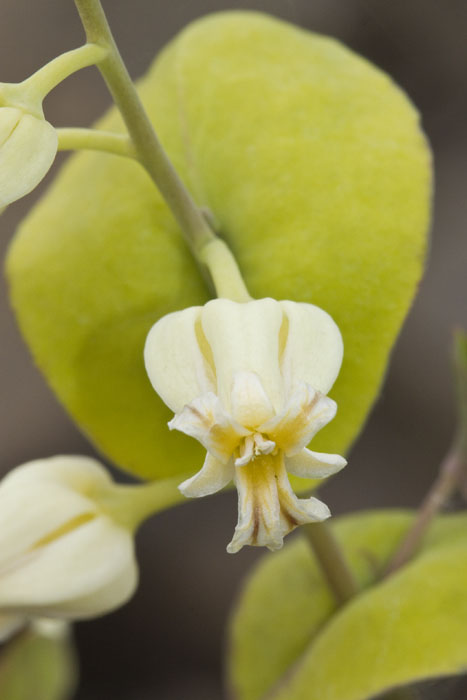

Scientific classification
- Kingdom: Plantae
- Clade: Tracheophytes
- Clade: Angiosperms
- Clade: Eudicots
- Clade: Rosids
- Order: Brassicales
- Family: Brassicaceae
- Genus: Streptanthus
- Species: S. diversifolius

Binomial name
- Streptanthus diversifolius S.Watson

= Streptanthus diversifolius =

Species of flowering plant

Streptanthus diversifolius is a species of flowering plant in the mustard family known by the common name variableleaf jewelflower, or varied-leaved jewelflower. It is endemic to California, where it is limited to the Sierra Nevada foothills. It is a resident of woodlands and other foothill habitat. It is an annual herb producing a hairless, waxy stem up to a meter tall. The basal leaves are variable in shape and are often divided into narrow, threadlike segments. Leaves higher on the stem are also variable, having round to lance-shaped blades which clasp the stem at their bases. Flowers occur at intervals along the upper stem, with one or two leaflike bracts at the base of the raceme. Each flower has an urn-shaped calyx of keeled sepals about half a centimeter long and white, yellowish, or purple in color, sometimes with white edging. White, purple-veined petals emerge from the tip. The fruit is a thin, flat, curving silique which may be 8 or 9 centimeters in length.
