= Streptanthus anomalus =

Scientific classification
- Kingdom: Plantae
- Clade: Tracheophytes
- Clade: Angiosperms
- Clade: Eudicots
- Clade: Rosids
- Order: Brassicales
- Family: Brassicaceae
- Genus: Streptanthus
- Species: S. anomalus

Binomial name
- Streptanthus anomalus D.L. Smith, A. Arthur & R.E. Preston

Species of flowering plant

Streptanthus anomalus is a species of flowering plant in family Brassicaceae known by the common names Mount Burdell jewelflower and Tcukamos jewelflower. It is endemic to Mount Burdell in Marin County, California.

== Description ==
Streptanthus anomalus is an annual plant with a simple or branched, erect stem, growing 15 to 40 cm (6 to 16 in) tall. Basal rosette leaves are 3 to 5 cm (1.2 to 2.0 in) long, oblanceolate, dentate, with ciliate margins, while ovate cauline leaves have distinctive clasping bases. By flowering time, most rosette and proximal leaves are absent, and distal leaves have faded to a greenish yellow. Flowers occur in bracted, one-sided racemes, with 2–3 mm (0.08–0.12 in) pedicels. The calyx is urn shaped, and the sepals are either greenish-yellow or dark wine-red. 7–9 mm (0.28–0.35 in) long petals are exserted from the calyx, with yellow bases, brown to purple blades, and white margins. Stamens occur in either 3 unequal pairs, or with 4 long and 2 short stamens. The upper stamens have fused filaments and sterile anthers. Fruits are siliques, 4–7 cm (1 9/16–2 3/4 in) long and 3–4 mm (0.12–0.16 in) wide, with 30-40 seeds. Each seed is 2 mm (0.08 in) long and 1.75 mm (0.07 in) wide, with a narrow wing.

== Range ==
Streptanthus anomalus is restricted to 3 occurrences on the lower slopes of Mount Burdell, north of the City of Novato in Marin County, California. These occurrences were discovered in 2011, 2012, and 2023.

== Habitat ==
Streptanthus anomalus is endemic to serpentine soils, where it occurs in sparsely vegetated grasslands with thin, rocky soils.

== Etymology ==
The specific epithet "anomalus" alludes to the anomalous possession of bracted inflorescences, which are absent among other members of section Euclisia. "Mount Burdell" refers to the range of the species, while "Tcukamos" is the Coast Miwok name for that geographic feature.

== Taxonomy ==
Streptanthus anomalus was described in 2019. It has been placed in section Euclisia alongside S. glandulosus. It does, however, share some characteristics with S. tortuosus, which suggests a possible hybrid origin.

== Conservation ==
Streptanthus anomalus has been assigned a California Rare Plant Rank of 1B.1 indicating that the species is rare, threatened, or endangered throughout its range.

It has also been assigned a NatureServe status of G1S1, indicating that the species is critically imperiled.
