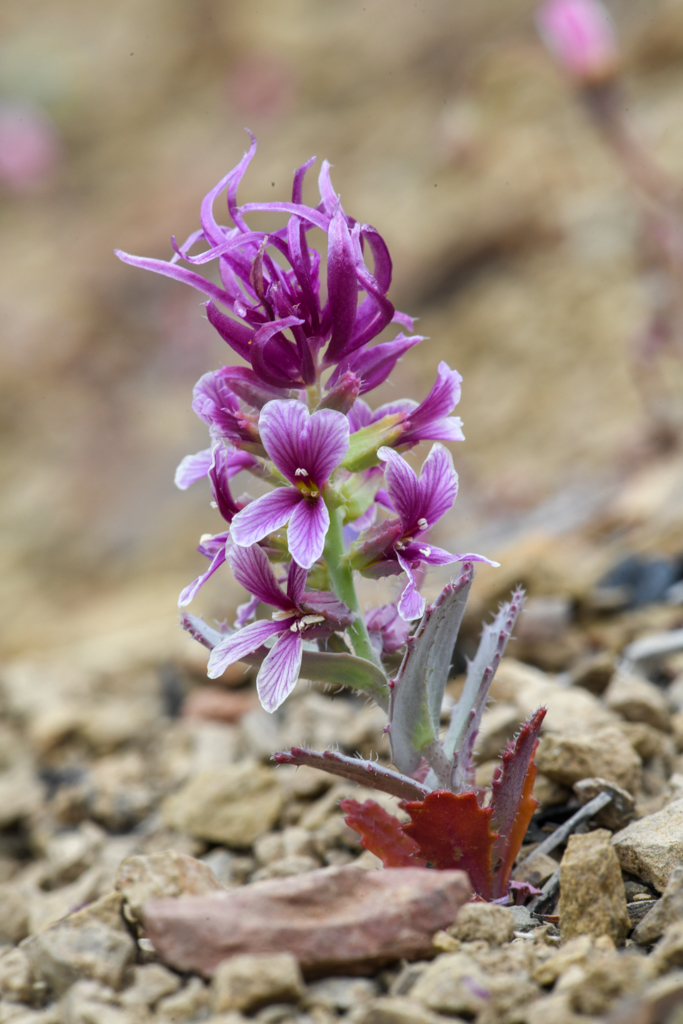

Conservation status
- Critically Imperiled (NatureServe)

Scientific classification
- Kingdom: Plantae
- Clade: Tracheophytes
- Clade: Angiosperms
- Clade: Eudicots
- Clade: Rosids
- Order: Brassicales
- Family: Brassicaceae
- Genus: Streptanthus
- Species: S. callistus

Binomial name
- Streptanthus callistus J.L.Morrison

= Streptanthus callistus =

Species of flowering plant

Streptanthus callistus is a rare species of flowering plant in the mustard family known by the common name Mount Hamilton jewelflower. It is endemic to Santa Clara County, California, where it is known from only about five occurrences around Mount Hamilton. It grows in chaparral and woodlands and on dry scree. It is an annual herb producing a small stem up to 8 or 9 centimeters tall with a bristly base. The toothed oval leaves are under 2 centimeters long. The inflorescence is a cluster-like raceme of flowers, the top ones sterile. The fertile flowers on the lower raceme have calyces of bristly purple-green sepals under a centimeter long with flaring purple petals at the tip. The sterile flowers at the top of the raceme have narrow, elongated, hairless purple sepals. The fruit is a cylindrical, bristle-studded silique measuring up to 2 or 2.5 centimeters long.
