= Streptanthus flavescens =

Scientific classification
- Kingdom: Plantae
- Clade: Tracheophytes
- Clade: Angiosperms
- Clade: Eudicots
- Clade: Rosids
- Order: Brassicales
- Family: Brassicaceae
- Genus: Streptanthus
- Species: S. flavescens

Binomial name
- Streptanthus flavescens Hook.

Synonyms
- List: Caulanthus flavescens (Hook.) Payson; Caulanthus procerus (W.H.Brewer ex A.Gray) S.Watson; Erysimum flavescens (Hook.) Kuntze; Guillenia flavescens (Hook.) Greene; Guillenia hookeri (Hook.) Greene; Streptanthus dudleyi Eastw.; Streptanthus flavescens (S.Watson) Torr., nom. illeg.; Streptanthus lilacinus Hoover; Streptanthus procerus W.H.Brewer ex A.Gray; Thelypodium flavescens (Hook.) Jeps., nom. illeg.; Thelypodium flavescens S.Watson; Thelypodium greenei Jeps.; Thelypodium hookeri Greene; Thelypodium procerum (W.H.Brewer ex A.Gray) Greene

Species of flowering plant

Streptanthus flavescens, synonyms including Guillenia flavescens, is a species of mustard plant in the family Brassicaceae. It is one of several species known by the common name yellow mustard, though the plant most widely known as yellow mustard is probably Sinapis alba. S. flavescens is a thin-stemmed annual herb growing large, lobed or toothed leaves up to 22 centimeters long around its base, and smaller, less toothed leaves along its gray-pink to brown stem. At intervals along the upper stem appear cream, yellowish, or very pale purple flowers, each somewhat cuboid in shape and about a centimeter long. The tips of the petals around the mouth are curled, flared, or claw-like. The fruit is a thin silique up to 9 centimeters long. This species is endemic to California, where it grows in the valleys and mountains surrounding the San Francisco Bay Area.
