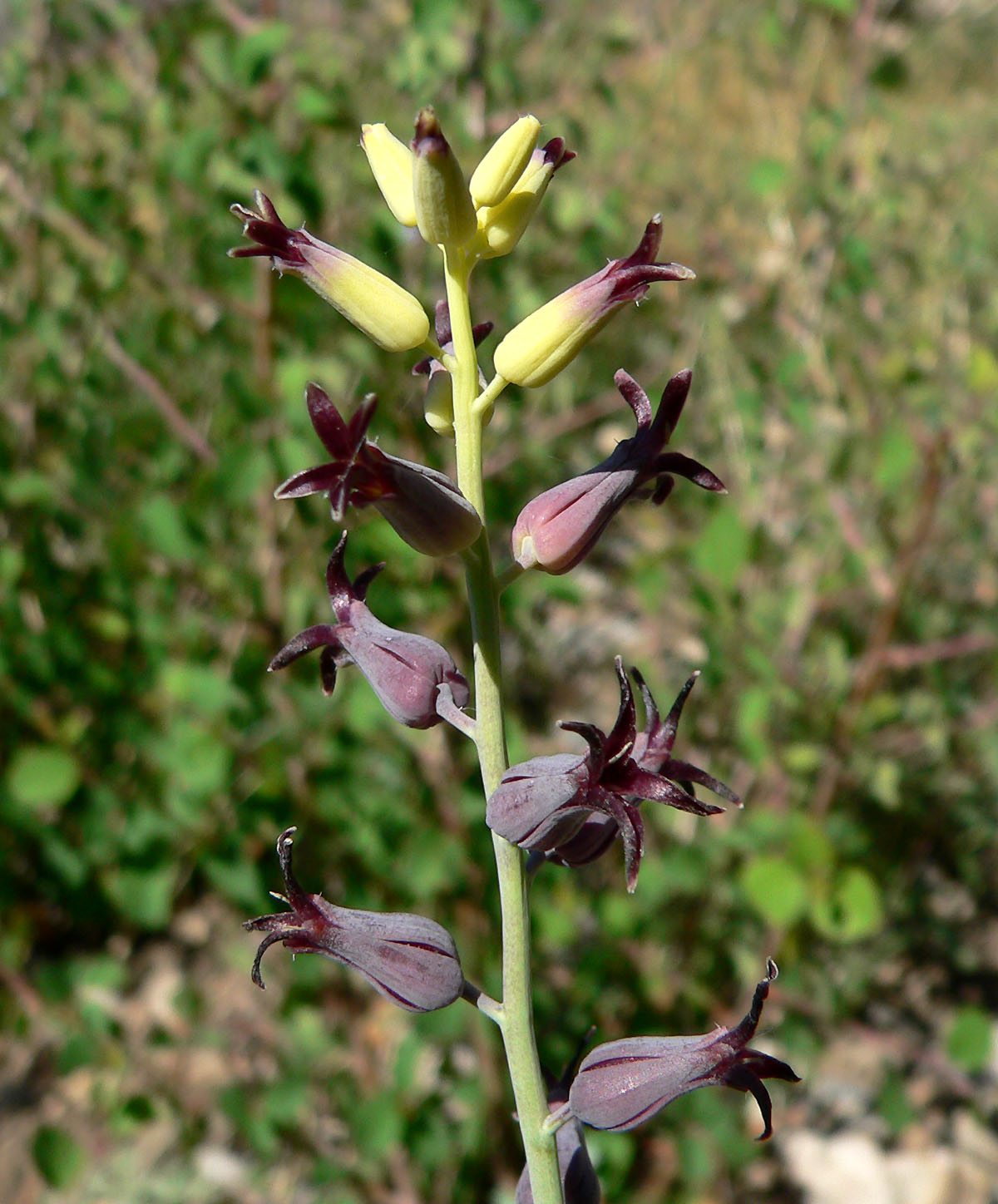
- Streptanthus cordatus, southern Nevada

Scientific classification
- Kingdom: Plantae
- Clade: Tracheophytes
- Clade: Angiosperms
- Clade: Eudicots
- Clade: Rosids
- Order: Brassicales
- Family: Brassicaceae
- Genus: Streptanthus; Nutt. (1825)

Species
- 56, see text

Synonyms
- Agianthus Greene (1906); Cartiera Greene (1906); Caulanthus S.Watson (1871); Disaccanthus Greene (1906); Euklisia Rydb. ex Small (1903); Guillenia Greene (1906); Icianthus Greene (1906); Mesoreanthus Greene (1904); Microsemia Greene (1904); Microsisymbrium O.E.Schulz (1924), nom. superfl.; Mitophyllum Greene (1904); Pleiocardia Greene (1904); Sibaropsis S.Boyd & T.S.Ross (1997); Stanfordia S.Watson (1880)

= Streptanthus =

Genus of flowering plants

Streptanthus is a genus of plants within the family Brassicaceae. There are 56 known species within the genus Streptanthus, distributed through the western and south-central United States and northern Mexico. The common names for this genus are twistflower and jewelflower. Twenty-four of the species and eleven lesser taxa occur in California, thirty-two of which are California endemics; seventeen of these California taxa are classified as rare plants.

== Species and subspecies ==
56 species are accepted. The following are some of the species (or subspecies) of the genus Streptanthus (county locations are not intended to be exhaustive):

- Streptanthus amplexicaulis (S.Watson) Jeps.
- Streptanthus anceps (Payson) Hoover
- Streptanthus anomalus D.L.Smith, A.Arthur & R.E.Preston
- Streptanthus barbatus S.Watson – Pacific jewelflower
- Streptanthus barbiger Greene – Bearded jewelflower
- Streptanthus barnebyi (Rollins & P.K.Holmgren) Al-Shehbaz
- Streptanthus batrachopus J.L.Morrison – Mt. Tamalpais jewelflower
- Streptanthus bernardinus (Greene) Parish – Laguna Mountain jewelflower
- Streptanthus brachiatus F.W.Hoffm. – Socrates Mine jewelflower
- Streptanthus bracteatus A.Gray – Bracted twistflower
- Streptanthus breweri A.Gray – Brewer's jewelflower
- Streptanthus californicus (S.Watson) Greene
- Streptanthus callistus J.L.Morrison – Mt. Hamilton jewelflower
- Streptanthus campestris S.Watson – Southern jewelflower
- Streptanthus carinatus C.Wright ex A.Gray – Lyreleaf jewelflower
- Streptanthus cooperi (S.Watson) Al-Shehbaz
- Streptanthus cordatus Nutt. – Heartleaf twistflower
- Streptanthus coulteri (S.Watson) Greene
- Streptanthus crassicaulis Torr.
- Streptanthus cutleri Cory – Cutler's jewelflower
- Streptanthus diversifolius S.Watson – Variableleaf jewelflower
- Streptanthus drepanoides Kruckeb. & J.L.Morrison – Sicklefruit jewelflower
- Streptanthus farnsworthianus J.T.Howell – Farnsworth's jewelflower
- Streptanthus fenestratus (Greene) J.T.Howell – Tehipite Valley jewelflower (Fresno County, California)
- Streptanthus flavescens Hook.
- Streptanthus glandulosus Hook. – Bristly jewelflower, common jewelflower (Mendocino County to San Luis Obispo County, California)
  - Streptanthus glandulosus subsp. albidus (Greene) Al-Shehbaz, M.S.Mayer & D.W.Taylor – Metcalf Canyon jewelflower (Santa Clara County, California), endangered
  - Streptanthus glandulosus subsp. arkii M.S.Mayer
  - Streptanthus glandulosus subsp. glandulosus
  - Streptanthus glandulosus var. hoffmanii Kruckeb.
  - Streptanthus glandulosus subsp. josephinensis Al-Shehbaz & M.S.Mayer
  - Streptanthus glandulosus subsp. niger (Greene) Al-Shehbaz, M.S.Mayer & D.W.Taylor – Tiburon jewelflower (Marin County, California), endangered
  - Streptanthus glandulosus subsp. pulchellus (Greene) Kruckeb.
  - Streptanthus glandulosus subsp. raichei M.S.Mayer
  - Streptanthus glandulosus subsp. secundus (Greene) Kruckeb.
  - Streptanthus glandulosus subsp. sonomensis (Kruckeb.) M.S.Mayer & D.W.Taylor
- Streptanthus glaucus (S.Watson) Jeps.
- Streptanthus gracilis Eastw. – Alpine jewelflower
- Streptanthus hallii (Payson) Jeps.
- Streptanthus hammittii (S.Boyd & T.S.Ross) Al-Shehbaz, Hammitt's clay-cress (Riverside and San Diego counties, California)
- Streptanthus hesperidis Jeps.
- Streptanthus heterophyllus Nutt.
- Streptanthus hispidus A.Gray – Mt. Diablo jewelflower (Contra Costa County, California)
- Streptanthus howellii S.Watson – Howell's jewelflower
- Streptanthus hyacinthoides Hook. – Sandhill twistflower (Texas, Arkansas, Louisiana, Oklahoma, Nebraska)
- Streptanthus inflatus (S.Watson) Greene
- Streptanthus insignis Jeps. – Plumed jewelflower
- Streptanthus juneae N.Jensen (San Bernardino Mountains, San Bernardino County, California)
- Streptanthus lasiophyllus (Hook. & Arn.) Hoover
- Streptanthus lemmonii S.Watson
- Streptanthus longisiliquus G.Clifton & R.E.Buck – Longfruit jewelflower
- Streptanthus maculatus Nutt. – Clasping jewelflower, type species, (Arkansas, Oklahoma, Texas)
- Streptanthus major (M.E.Jones) Jeps.
- Streptanthus medeirosii N.Jensen (Tehachapi Mountains, Kern County, California)
- Streptanthus morrisonii F.W.Hoffm. – Morrison's jewelflower
- Streptanthus oblanceolatus T.W.Nelson & J.P.Nelson
- Streptanthus oliganthus Rollins – Masonic Mountain jewelflower
- Streptanthus petiolaris A.Gray
- Streptanthus pilosus (S.Watson) Jeps.
- Streptanthus platycarpus A.Gray
- Streptanthus polygaloides A.Gray – Milkwort jewelflower
- Streptanthus simulans (Payson) Jeps.
- Streptanthus squamiformis Goodman
- Streptanthus tortuosus Kellogg – Mountain jewelflower, shieldplant
- Streptanthus vernalis R.O'Donnell & R.W.Dolan – Early jewelflower
- Streptanthus vimineus (Greene) Al-Shehbaz & D.W.Taylor

=== Formerly placed here ===
- Streptanthella longirostris (S.Watson) Rydb. (as Streptanthus longirostris (S.Watson) S.Watson) – longbeak streptanthella, streptanthella (western US and northwestern Mexico)
