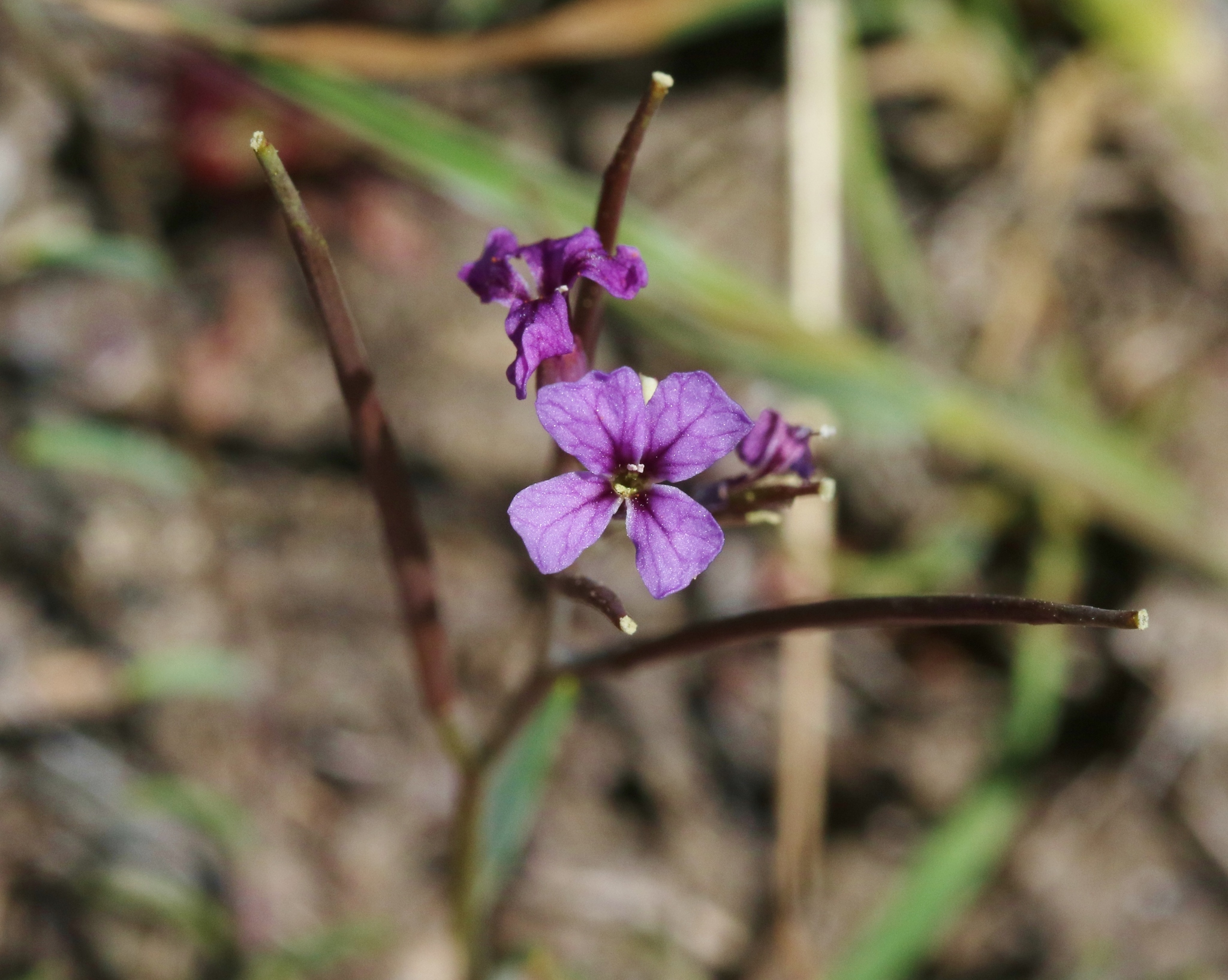

Conservation status
- Imperiled (NatureServe)

Scientific classification
- Kingdom: Plantae
- Clade: Embryophytes
- Clade: Tracheophytes
- Clade: Spermatophytes
- Clade: Angiosperms
- Clade: Eudicots
- Clade: Rosids
- Order: Brassicales
- Family: Brassicaceae
- Genus: Streptanthus
- Species: S. hammittii

Binomial name
- Streptanthus hammittii (S.Boyd & T.S.Ross) Al-Shehbaz (2012)

Synonyms
- Sibaropsis hammittii S.Boyd & T.S.Ross (1997)

= Streptanthus hammittii =

Species of flowering plant

Streptanthus hammittii is a species of flowering plant known by the common name Hammitt's clay-cress. It is endemic to California, where it is known from two locations in the Peninsular Ranges. The plant is known from the Santa Ana Mountains of Riverside County and Viejas Mountain and nearby peaks east of San Diego. It grows in grassy habitat in openings in chaparral alongside purple needlegrass (Nassella pulchra), generally in moist areas in heavy clay soils. This species and its genus were first described to science in 1997.

This is an annual herb producing a waxy, hairless or slightly hairy stem up to about 20 centimeters tall. The leaves are linear in shape, measuring up to 4.5 centimeters long and about a millimeter wide. The inflorescence produces mustardlike flowers with four spoon-shaped, dark-veined, purple-pink petals each about a centimeter long. The fruit is a long, narrow, flat silique measuring 1.5 to 2.5 centimeters long and under a millimeter wide. This fruit contains up to 44 minute seeds.
