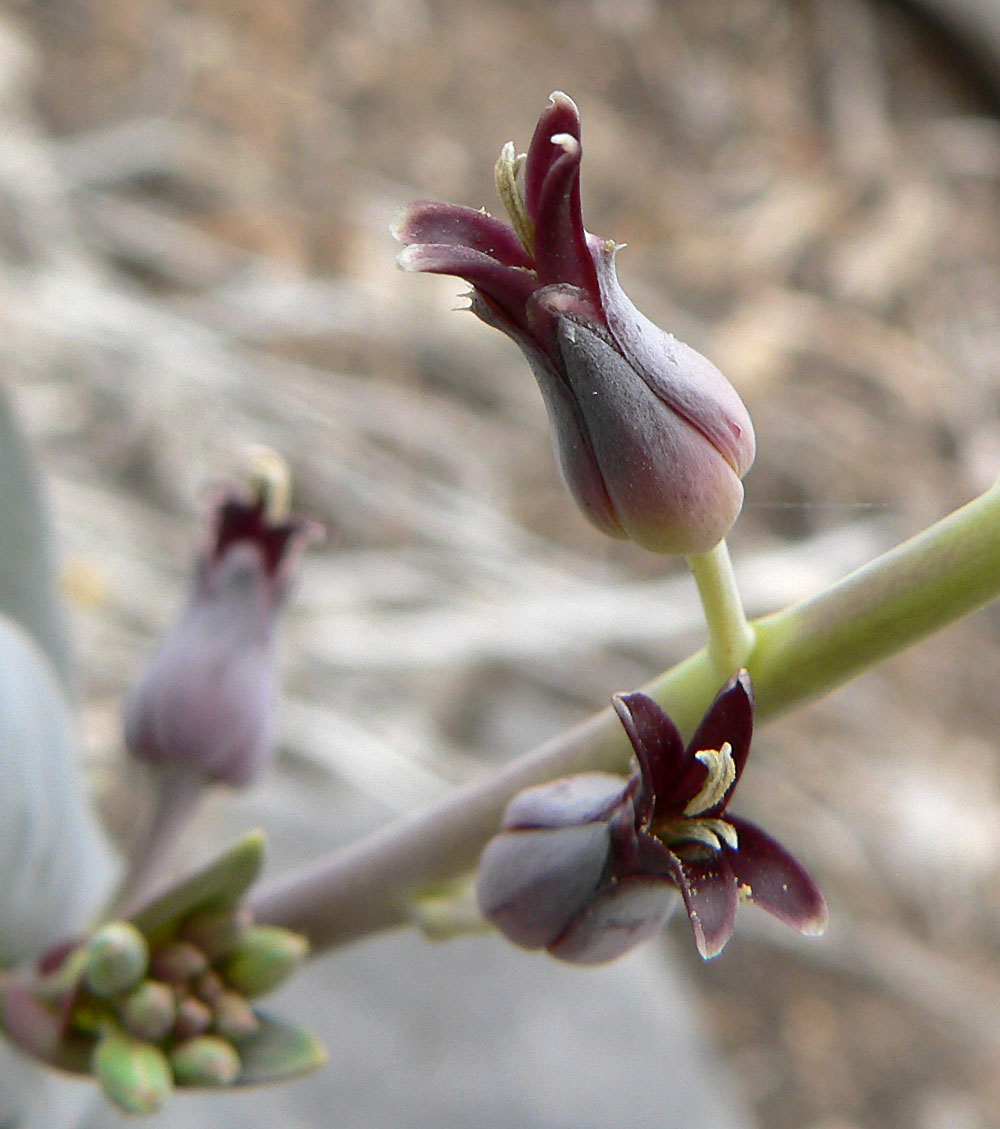

Conservation status
- Secure (NatureServe)

Scientific classification
- Kingdom: Plantae
- Clade: Tracheophytes
- Clade: Angiosperms
- Clade: Eudicots
- Clade: Rosids
- Order: Brassicales
- Family: Brassicaceae
- Genus: Streptanthus
- Species: S. cordatus

Binomial name
- Streptanthus cordatus Nutt.

= Streptanthus cordatus =

Species of flowering plant

Streptanthus cordatus is a species of flowering plant in the mustard family known by the common name heartleaf twistflower. It is native to the western United States, where it can be found in many types of sagebrush, woodland, and forest habitat. It is a perennial herb producing a branched or unbranched stem up to about a meter tall. It is often waxy in texture. The basal leaves are oval or spoon-shaped with bristle-toothed blades borne on rough-haired petioles. Leaves higher on the stem are oval to lance-shaped, up to 9 centimeters long with their bases usually clasping the stem. Flowers occur at intervals along the upper stem. Each has a calyx of sepals roughly a centimeter long which begin greenish yellow and mature purple. Four purple petals emerge from the tip of each calyx. The fruit is a thin, narrow silique which may reach 14 centimeters in length or longer.
