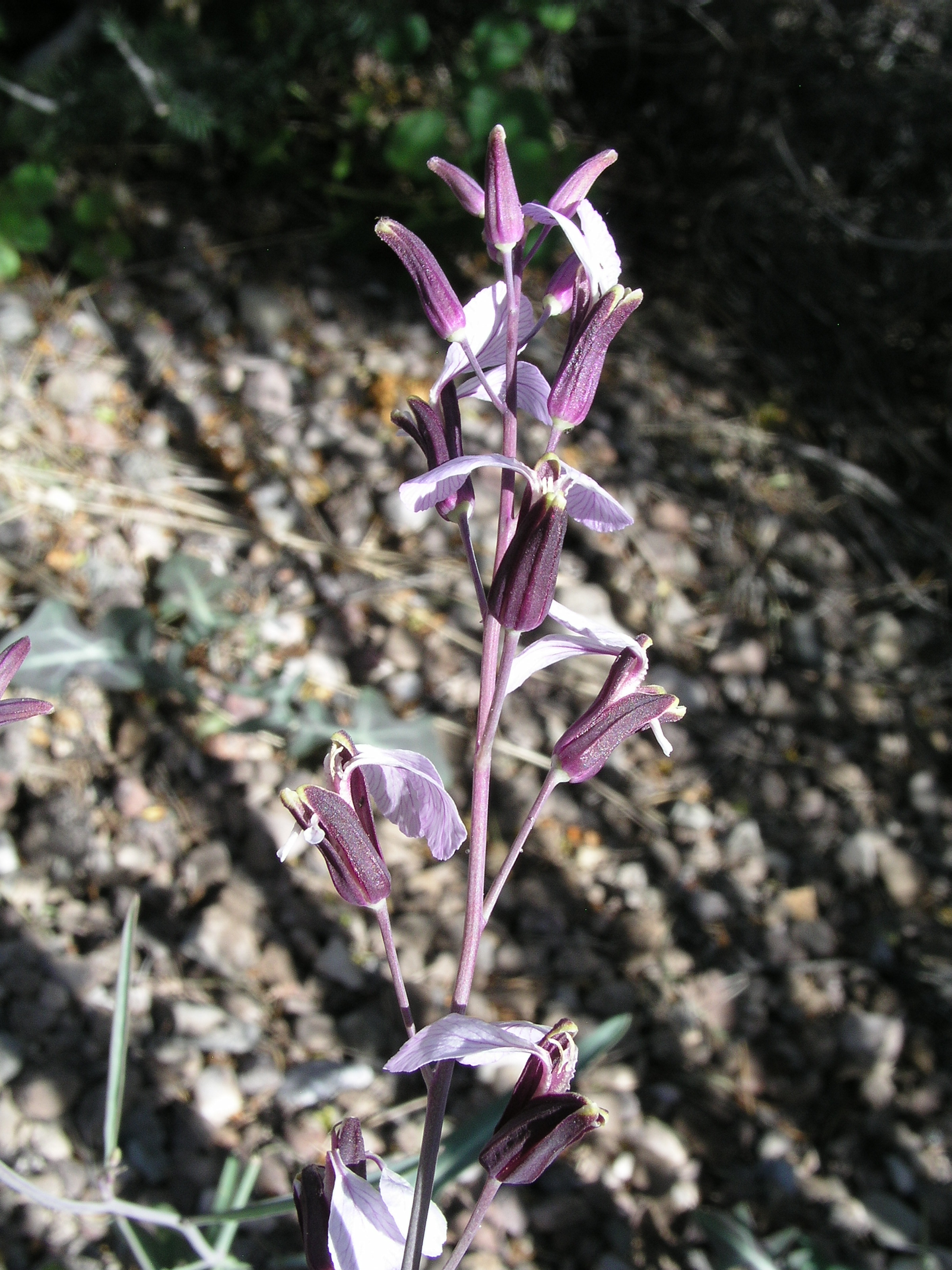

Scientific classification
- Kingdom: Plantae
- Clade: Tracheophytes
- Clade: Angiosperms
- Clade: Eudicots
- Clade: Rosids
- Order: Brassicales
- Family: Brassicaceae
- Genus: Streptanthus
- Species: S. cutleri

Binomial name
- Streptanthus cutleri Cory

= Streptanthus cutleri =

Species of plant

Streptanthus cutleri, known as Cutler's jewelflower, is a species of annual flower only found in the Big Bend region of Texas. Its specific epithet and common name both reference Hugh Carson Cutler, who first collected the plant in 1937. A second specimen was later collected when the plant was in fruit, and this holotype was collected at the exact location as the first specimen, in Maravillas Canyon near Black Gap. Its distinguishing characteristic is that only two petals of each its flowers is enlarged.

== Description ==
Streptanthus cutleri grows in an entirely glabrous habit 35–50 cm (14–20 in) tall. Its terete stems are up to 2 mm (0.079 in) wide and are simple at their base but branch above. Plants have five to ten oblanceolate, sharply pinnatifid basal leaves borne on petioles. These purplish leaves are 5–10 cm (2.0–3.9 in) long and 2 cm (0.79 in) wide, with triangular apices. The ascending cauline leaves are as long or longer than the basal leaves and have narrower segments. Upper cauline leaves are linear, entire, or undulate. The purplish petioles are narrowly winged and have three nerves, with their absence of clasping differentiating S. cutleri from other Texan species of Streptanthus. The petioles are difficult to distinguish from the leaf blades. The flowers have four clawed petals, with two enlarged and the other two only represented by the claws. Mature petals are about 2.5 cm (0.98 in) long. The claws are about three-quarters this total length and the blades are two-fifths of the length. Claws of petals are greenish below and pale above, growing up to 1 cm (0.39 in) long and 2 mm (0.079 in) broad; blades of petals are palely purple with prominent pinnate nerves and dark purple branching veins, the blades growing up to 1–1.4 cm (0.39–0.55 in) long and 5–6 mm (0.20–0.24 in) broad. The calyx is saccate. The five oblong, purple sepals are 1–1.2 cm (0.39–0.47 in) long. The linear anthers are sagittate. The flat, glabrous pods are 3.5–6 cm (1.4–2.4 in) long and 4 mm (0.16 in) wide. Its peduncles have cells with eight or more seeds and are 1–1.8 cm (0.39–0.71 in) long. Its circular, flat seeds are light brown with broad wings; the entire seed is 4 cm (1.6 in) broad, with the body and wing each taking half of this total length.

== Distribution and habitat ==
The holotype of Streptanthus cutleri was collected in Maravillas Canyon in Brewster County, Texas at an elevation of 2500 meters, but the plant can generally be found in rocky or sandy areas of the Big Bend region, including dry stream beds, talus or limestone slopes, open scrubland, or woodlands, usually at elevations between 400 and 700 meters.
