= Streptanthus howellii =

Conservation status
- Imperiled (NatureServe)

Scientific classification
- Kingdom: Plantae
- Clade: Embryophytes
- Clade: Tracheophytes
- Clade: Spermatophytes
- Clade: Angiosperms
- Clade: Eudicots
- Clade: Rosids
- Order: Brassicales
- Family: Brassicaceae
- Genus: Streptanthus
- Species: S. howellii

Binomial name
- Streptanthus howellii S.Watson

Species of flowering plant

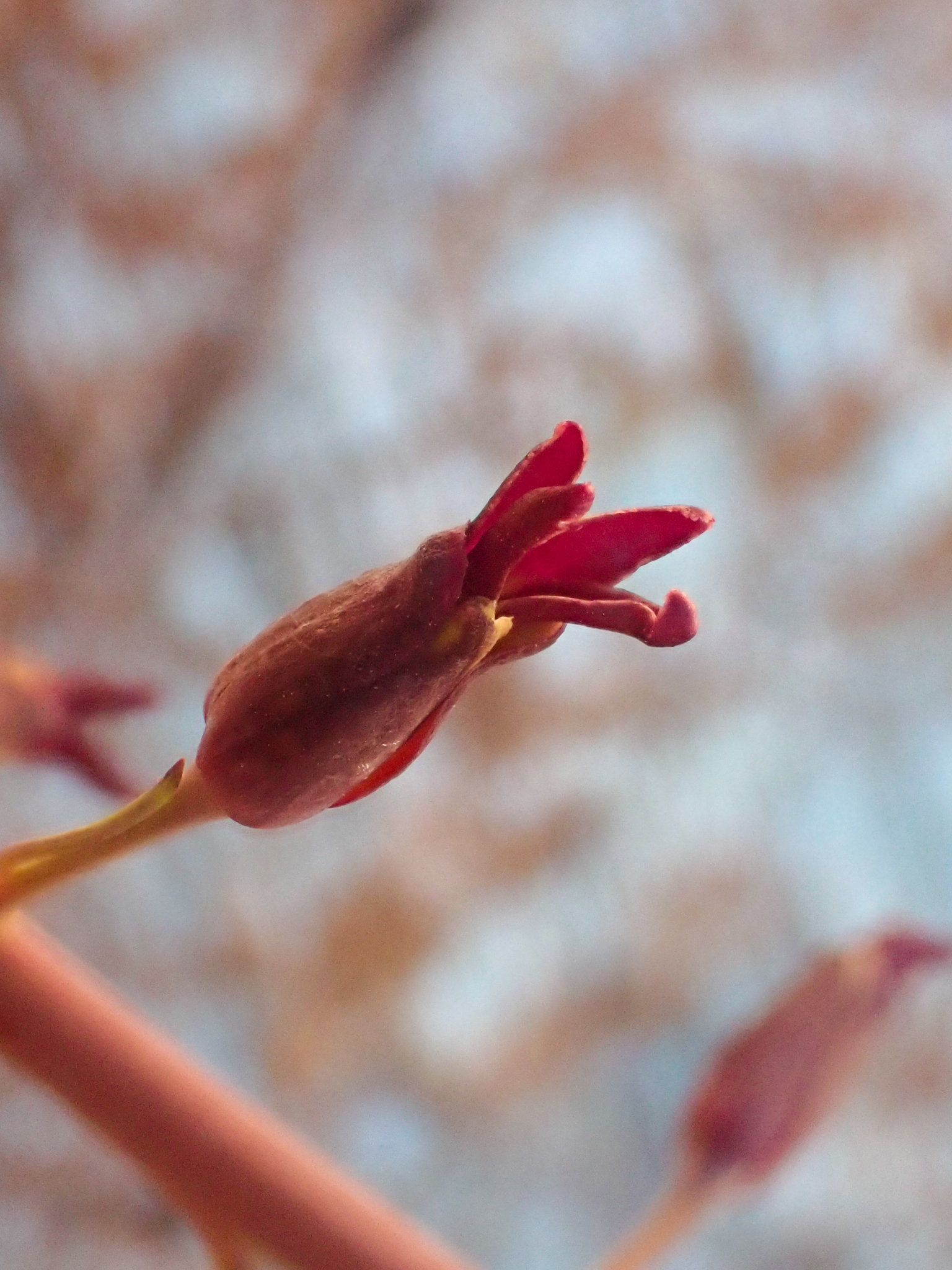
Howell's jewelflower (Streptanthus howellii) in the United States.

Streptanthus howellii is an uncommon species of flowering plant in the mustard family known by the common name Howell's jewelflower.

== Characteristics ==
It is endemic to the Klamath Mountains of southern Oregon and northern California. It grows in mountain forests on serpentine soils. It is a perennial herb producing a hairless, often waxy-textured stem up to 70 or 80 centimeters in maximum length. It is generally unbranched. The ephemeral basal leaves have fleshy oval blades with smooth or toothed edges, borne on petioles. Leaves higher up the stem are similar but smaller and narrower, with shorter petioles or none. They do not clasp the stem. Flowers occur at intervals along the upper stem. Each has a calyx of purple sepals under a centimeter long with purple-tipped yellow petals emerging from the tip. The fruit is a thin, smooth, curved silique up to 12 centimeters long.

This rare plant is threatened by wildfire suppression; it would be more common if its habitat were allowed its natural fire regime. It is also threatened by mining operations.
