= Streptanthus hispidus =

Conservation status
- Imperiled (NatureServe)

Scientific classification
- Kingdom: Plantae
- Clade: Tracheophytes
- Clade: Angiosperms
- Clade: Eudicots
- Clade: Rosids
- Order: Brassicales
- Family: Brassicaceae
- Genus: Streptanthus
- Species: S. hispidus

Binomial name
- Streptanthus hispidus A.Gray

Species of flowering plant

Streptanthus hispidus, the Mt. Diablo jewelflower, is a rare species of flowering plant in the mustard family.

== Distribution ==
It is endemic to Contra Costa County, California, where it is known from fewer than 15 occurrences on and around Mount Diablo. It grows in rocky outcrops in grassland and chaparral habitat. It is threatened by habitat degradation, such as trampling by hikers and destruction during maintenance activities.

== Description ==
Streptanthus hispidus is a bristly annual herb growing up to 30 centimeters tall. Flowers occur in a raceme, the uppermost ones often sterile and different in form. The bristly bell-shaped calyx of sepals is greenish brown in the fertile flowers and purple in the sterile. Fertile flowers have four light purple petals up to a centimeter long. The fruit is a bristly silique up to 8 centimeters in length.
