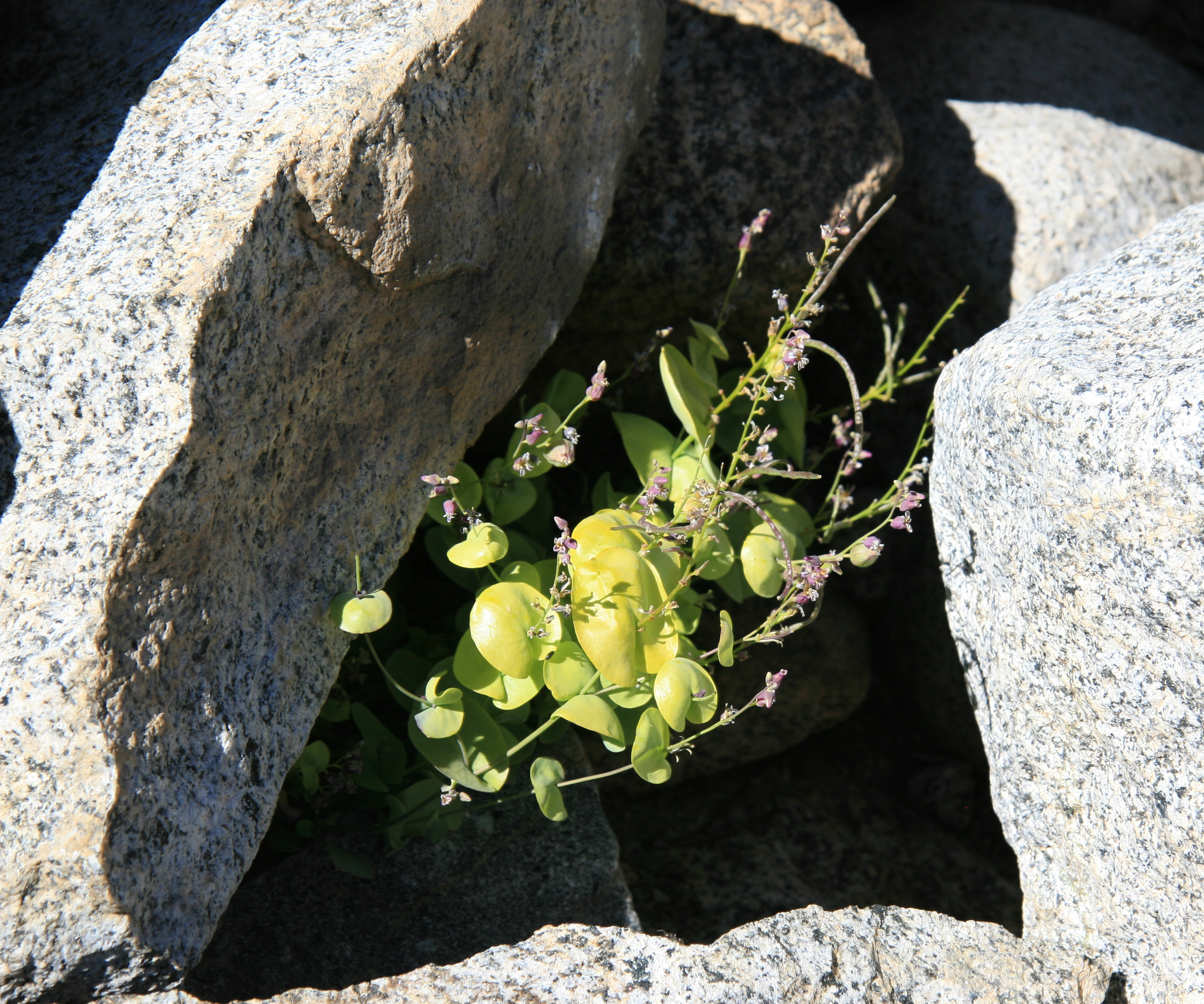

Scientific classification
- Kingdom: Plantae
- Clade: Tracheophytes
- Clade: Angiosperms
- Clade: Eudicots
- Clade: Rosids
- Order: Brassicales
- Family: Brassicaceae
- Genus: Streptanthus
- Species: S. tortuosus

Binomial name
- Streptanthus tortuosus Kellogg

= Streptanthus tortuosus =

Species of flowering plant

Streptanthus tortuosus is a biennial or short lived perennial plant in the mustard family (Brassicaceae) known by the common names shieldplant, shieldleaf, and mountain jewelflower.

== Range and habitat ==
It is native to the mountains of northern and central California, its distribution extending just into Oregon and Nevada in the United States. It grows in rocky and sandy areas in forests and woodland habitat.

== Growth pattern ==
It is highly variable in appearance and some authors divide it into many subtaxa. In general, it is a biennial or perennial herb growing a few centimeters to over a meter tall. It is hairless and often waxy in texture.

== Leaves and stems ==
The basal leaves have oval blades borne on winged petioles, and leaves higher on the stem may be longer and narrower, sometimes clasping the stem at the bases. Leaves turn yellow with age.

== Inflorescence and fruit ==
Flowers occur at intervals along the upper stem, and there is usually a leaflike bract below them. Each flower has an urn-shaped calyx of sepals in shades of purple or greenish yellow with four petals emerging from the tip. The fruit is a long, thin, curving silique up to 12 to 16 centimeters long.
