= Streptanthus barbatus =

Scientific classification
- Kingdom: Plantae
- Clade: Tracheophytes
- Clade: Angiosperms
- Clade: Eudicots
- Clade: Rosids
- Order: Brassicales
- Family: Brassicaceae
- Genus: Streptanthus
- Species: S. barbatus

Binomial name
- Streptanthus barbatus S.Watson

Species of flowering plant

Streptanthus barbatus is a species of flowering plant in the mustard family known by the common name Pacific jewelflower. It is endemic to the southern Klamath Mountains of far northern California, where it occurs in open wooded habitat among Jeffrey Pines, generally on serpentine soils. It is a perennial herb producing a decumbent or erect, sometimes branching stem up to 70 to 90 centimeters long. It is hairless except for some light hairs on the flowers and the bases of the leaves. The largest leaves are at the base of the plant. They are oval with faintly toothed, bristly edges (no more than 3 centimeters long) and borne on short petioles. Leaves above these are oval to rounded and may clasp the stem. Flowers occur at intervals along the upper stem. Each has a spherical to urn-shaped calyx of keeled sepals under a centimeter long with curving petals barely emerging from the tip. The calyx of sepals is whitish, darkening purple in maturity. The petals are purple. The fruit is a long, flat, curving silique which may be 7 centimeters in length.
