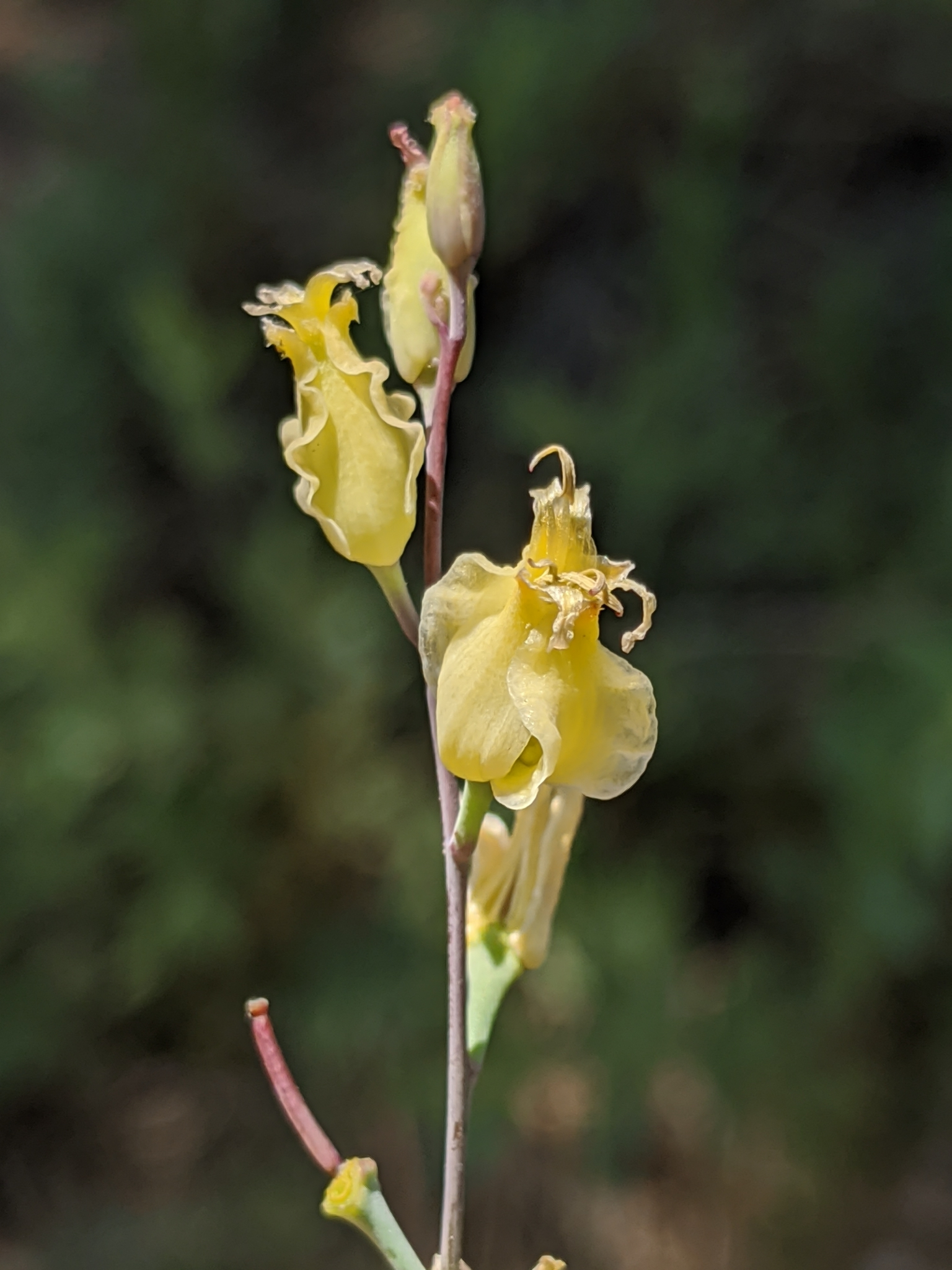

Scientific classification
- Kingdom: Plantae
- Clade: Tracheophytes
- Clade: Angiosperms
- Clade: Eudicots
- Clade: Rosids
- Order: Brassicales
- Family: Brassicaceae
- Genus: Streptanthus
- Species: S. bernardinus

Binomial name
- Streptanthus bernardinus (Greene) Parish

= Streptanthus bernardinus =

Species of flowering plant

Streptanthus bernardinus is a species of flowering plant in the mustard family known by the common name Laguna Mountains jewelflower.

== Distribution ==
It is native to southern California and northern Baja California, where it grows in the Transverse Ranges around Los Angeles and the Peninsular Ranges to the south, including the Laguna Mountains east of San Diego and the Sierra de Juarez and Sierra de San Pedro Mártir of Baja. Its habitat includes temperate coniferous forest and chaparral on mountain slopes.

== Description ==
Streptanthus bernardinus is a perennial herb growing from a woody caudex and producing an erect stem up to 60 to 80 centimeters tall. It is hairless and sometimes waxy in texture. The basal leaves are widely lance-shaped and up to 8 centimeters long by 2.5 wide. They are borne on petioles. Narrower lance-shaped leaves occur higher on the stem and may clasp the stem at their bases.

Flowers occur at intervals along the upper stem. Each has a bell-shaped calyx of greenish to yellow or white sepals just under a centimeter long. White petals emerge from the tip. The fruit is a thin, narrow silique which may be 8 to 12 centimeters in length or longer.
