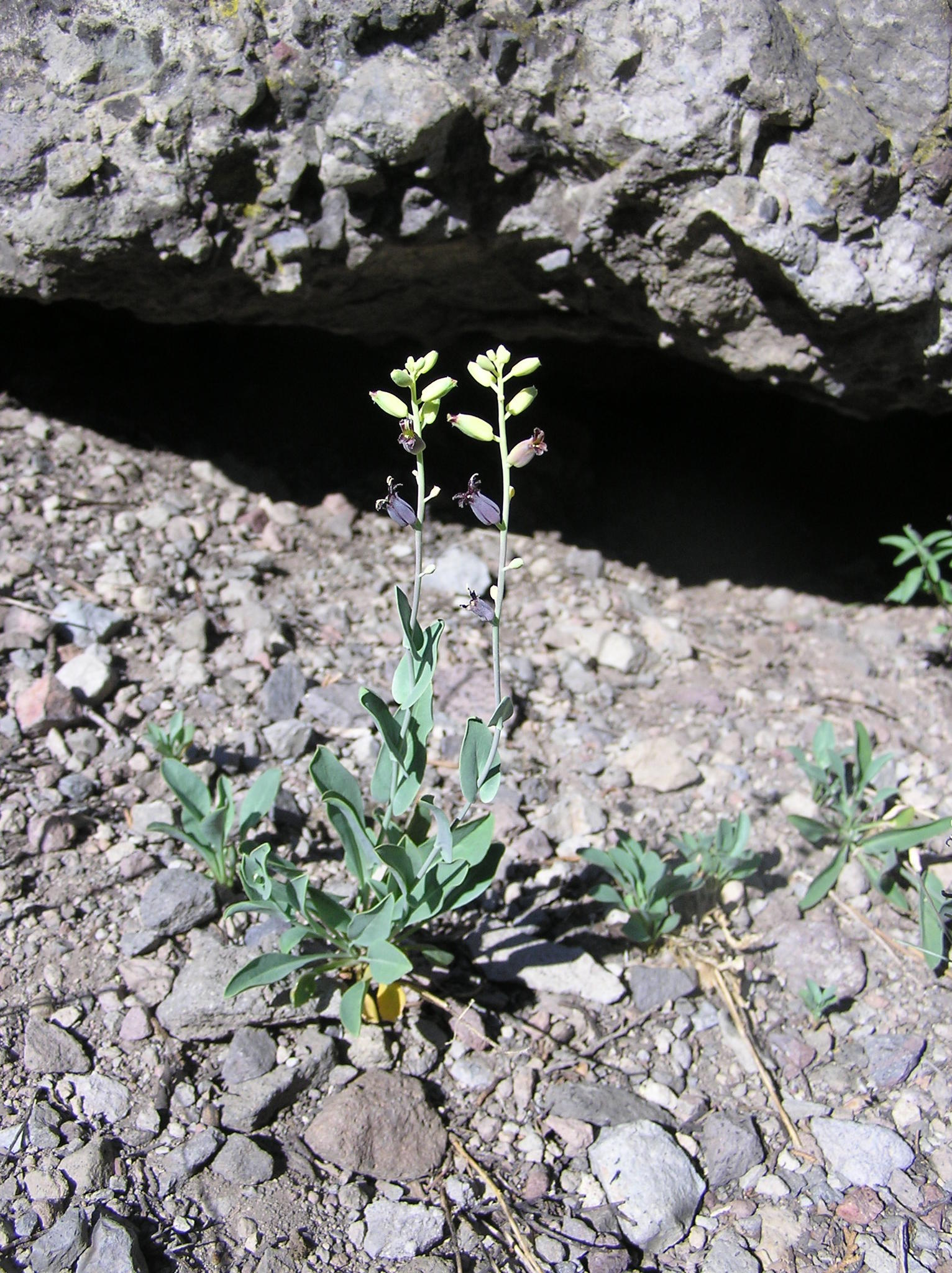

Scientific classification
- Kingdom: Plantae
- Clade: Tracheophytes
- Clade: Angiosperms
- Clade: Eudicots
- Clade: Rosids
- Order: Brassicales
- Family: Brassicaceae
- Genus: Streptanthus
- Species: S. oliganthus

Binomial name
- Streptanthus oliganthus Rollins

= Streptanthus oliganthus =

Species of flowering plant

Streptanthus oliganthus is an uncommon species of flowering plant in the mustard family known by the common name Masonic Mountain jewelflower. It is native to western Nevada and eastern California, where it grows in the rocky hills east of the central Sierra Nevada. Its habitat includes forest, woodland, sagebrush, and mountain talus. It is a rhizomatous perennial herb producing a hairless, waxy, usually unbranched stem up to about 40 or 50 centimeters in maximum height. The basal leaves have lance-shaped, smooth-edged blades up to 10 centimeters long borne on fuzzy to rough-haired petioles. Leaves higher on the stem have shorter blades which may clasp the stem at their bases. Flowers occur at intervals along the upper stem. Each has a bell-shaped calyx of purple sepals no more than a centimeter long. The petals emerging from the tip are reddish purple or purple-tipped. The fruit is a smooth, flat, straight or slightly curved silique up to 8 to 10 centimeters long.
