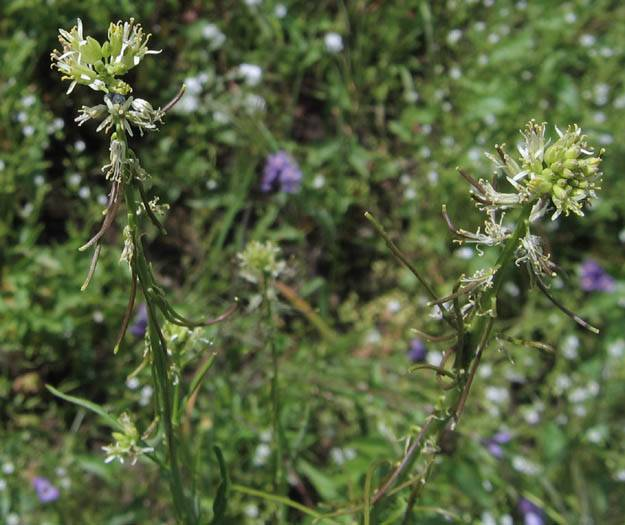

Scientific classification
- Kingdom: Plantae
- Clade: Tracheophytes
- Clade: Angiosperms
- Clade: Eudicots
- Clade: Rosids
- Order: Brassicales
- Family: Brassicaceae
- Genus: Streptanthus
- Species: S. lasiophyllus

Binomial name
- Streptanthus lasiophyllus (Hook. & Arn.) Hoover

Synonyms
- List: Caulanthus lasiophyllus (Hook. & Arn.) Payson; Caulanthus lasiophyllus var. inalienus (B.L.Rob.) Payson; Caulanthus lasiophyllus var. rigidus (Greene) Payson; Caulanthus lasiophyllus var. utahensis (Rydb.) Payson; Erysimum retrofractum Torr.; Guillenia inaliena (B.L.Rob.) Greene; Guillenia lasiophylla (Hook. & Arn.) Greene; Guillenia rigida (Greene) Greene; Hesperis reflexa (Nutt.) Kuntze; Microsisymbrium lasiophyllum (Hook. & Arn.) O.E.Schulz; Microsisymbrium lasiophyllum var. dasycarpum O.E.Schulz; Microsisymbrium lasiophyllum var. dissectum O.E.Schulz; Microsisymbrium lasiophyllum var. inalienum (B.L.Rob.) O.E.Schulz; Microsisymbrium lasiophyllum var. integrifolium O.E.Schulz; Microsisymbrium lasiophyllum var. rigidum (Greene) O.E.Schulz; Sisymbrium acuticarpum M.E.Jones; Sisymbrium lasiophyllum (Hook. & Arn.) K.Brandegee; Sisymbrium reflexum Nutt.; Sisymbrium reflexum var. xerophilum E.Fourn.; Streptanthus lasiophyllus var. inalienus (B.L.Rob.) Hoover; Streptanthus lasiophyllus var. utahensis (Rydb.) Hoover; Streptanthus rigidus (Greene) Hoover; Thelypodium lasiophyllum var. inalienum B.L.Rob.; Thelypodium lasiophyllum var. rigidum (Greene) B.L.Rob.; Thelypodium lasiophyllum var. utahense (Rydb.) Jeps.; Thelypodium lasiophyllum (Hook. & Arn.) Greene; Thelypodium neglectum M.E.Jones; Thelypodium rigidum Greene; Thelypodium tularense M.E.Jones; Thelypodium utahense Rydb.; Turritis lasiophylla Hook. & Arn.

= Streptanthus lasiophyllus =

Species of flowering plant

Streptanthus lasiophyllus, many synonyms including Guillenia lasiophylla, is a species of mustard plant known by the common names California mustard and slenderpod jewelflower. It is native to western North America from British Columbia to northern Mexico. It can be found in a variety of habitats such as desert flats, gravelly areas, limestone rocks, talus slopes, sandy banks, and grassy fields. This is a thin-stemmed erect annual herb with long lobed, toothed leaves surrounding the base of the plant and smaller leaves lining the stem. The top of the plant is occupied by an inflorescence of flowers, each with widely spaced oval-shaped white or yellowish petals half a centimeter long. The fruit is a flat, narrow silique up to 7 centimeters long which hangs downward from the stem. Flowers bloom March to June.
