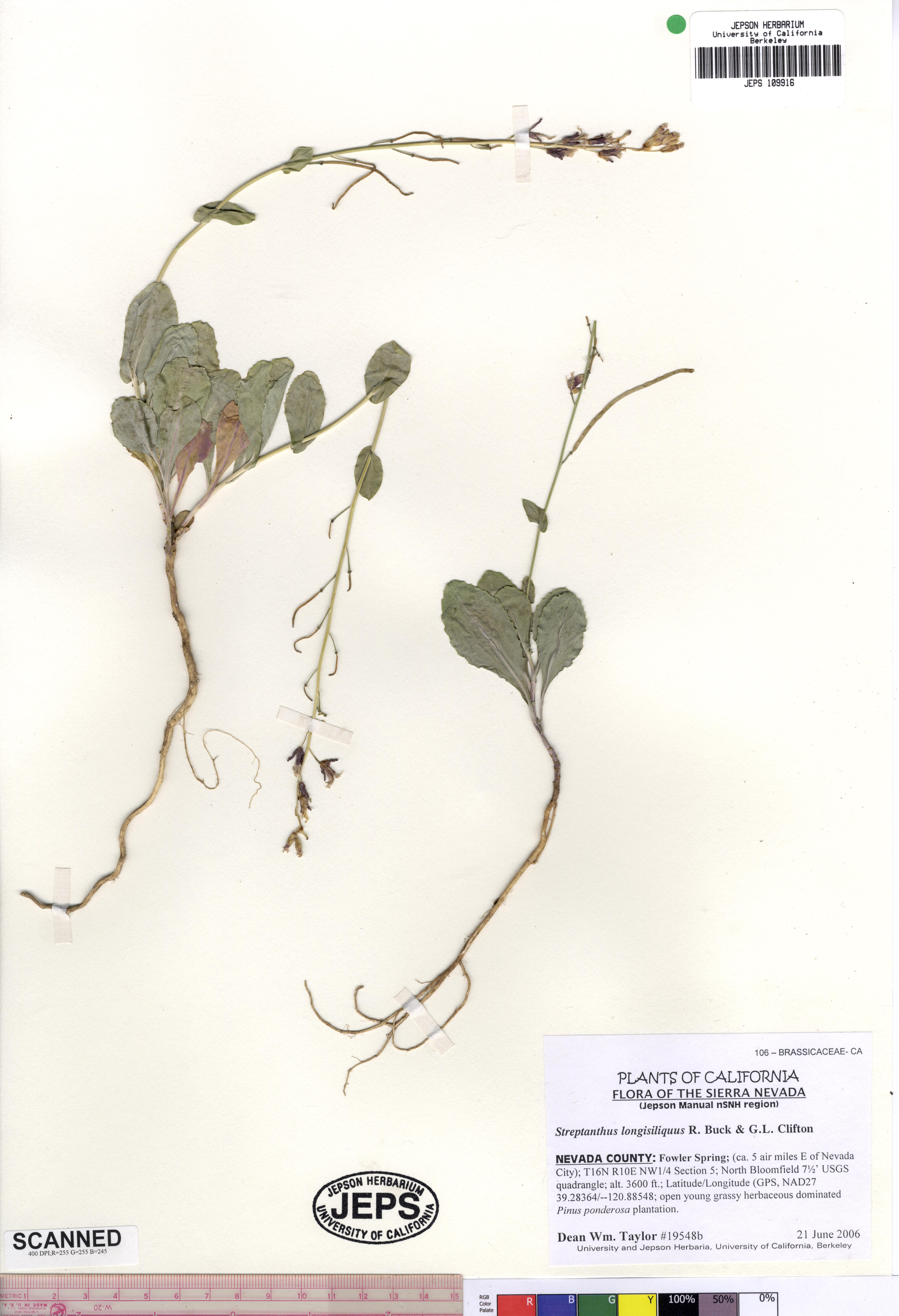

Conservation status
- Vulnerable (NatureServe)

Scientific classification
- Kingdom: Plantae
- Clade: Embryophytes
- Clade: Tracheophytes
- Clade: Spermatophytes
- Clade: Angiosperms
- Clade: Eudicots
- Clade: Rosids
- Order: Brassicales
- Family: Brassicaceae
- Genus: Streptanthus
- Species: S. longisiliquus

Binomial name
- Streptanthus longisiliquus G.L.Clifton & R.E.Buck

= Streptanthus longisiliquus =

Species of flowering plant

Streptanthus longisiliquus (orth. var. S. longisiliqus) is a species of flowering plant in the mustard family known by the common name long-fruit jewelflower. It was first described to science in 2007. It is endemic to northern California, where it is known from Butte, Tehama, and Shasta Counties. It can be found in forest and woodland habitat in mountains and foothills. It is a short-lived perennial herb producing a few-branched stem up to 1.2 to 1.5 meters in maximum height. It is mostly hairless except for some light hairs on the inflorescences and sometimes the leaf petioles. The basal leaves have oval or spoon-shaped blades up to 10 centimeters long, usually with smooth edges. Leaves higher on the stem are oval or oblong and lack petioles, their bases often clasping the stem. Flowers occur at intervals along the upper stem. Each flower has a bell-shaped calyx of sepals which yellow-green at the base and purplish at the tip, measuring under a centimeter in length. The petals emerging from the end are brownish or purplish with greenish bases. The fruit is a flattened, curving silique that can be quite long even for the genus, measuring up to 15 centimeters in length.
