= Streptanthus breweri =

Scientific classification
- Kingdom: Plantae
- Clade: Tracheophytes
- Clade: Angiosperms
- Clade: Eudicots
- Clade: Rosids
- Order: Brassicales
- Family: Brassicaceae
- Genus: Streptanthus
- Species: S. breweri

Binomial name
- Streptanthus breweri A.Gray

Species of flowering plant

Streptanthus breweri is a species of flowering plant in the mustard family known by the common name Brewer's jewelflower. It is endemic to California, where it can be found in the coastal mountain ranges from the Klamath Mountains south to the San Francisco Bay Area. Its habitat includes chaparral and woodlands, often on serpentine soils. It is an annual herb producing an upright, branching stem up to about 80 centimeters in maximum height. It is hairless except for fine hairs on some of the inflorescence parts, and it may be waxy in texture. The basal leaves have oval blades borne on petioles, and the lance-shaped leaves higher up the stem clasp it at their bases. Flowers occur at intervals along the upper stem, sometimes in a zig-zagging, one-sided array. Each has an urn-shaped calyx of keeled greenish or purplish sepals less than a centimeter long. White, purple, or purple-veined white petals emerge from the tip. The fruit is a narrow, curved silique which may be 9 to 11 centimeters in length.

The leaves of the plant sometimes have hardened, orange-pigmented callosities on the blades which are thought to be egg-mimics. Female California White butterflies (Pontia sisymbrii syn. Pieris s.) lay eggs on Streptanthus leaves, and they choose leaves that have not yet had eggs deposited on them. Each larva can easily eat a whole plant, and the butterfly performs an "egg-load assessment" to determine the potential competition for its larva. Leaves that have grown callosities, which strongly resemble the orange eggs of the butterfly, are less likely visited by egg-laying females, protecting the plant from herbivory.
