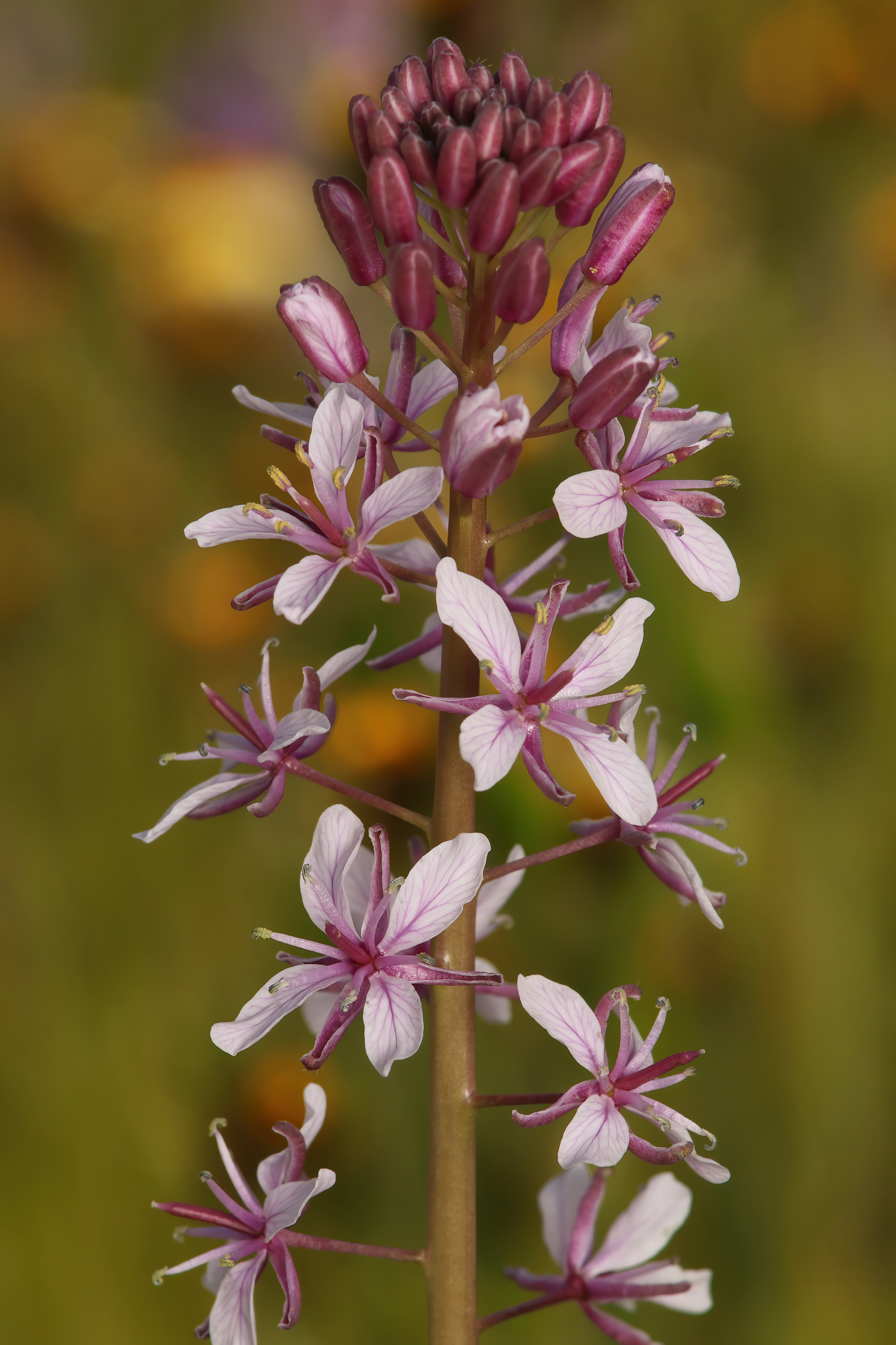
- In Carrizo Plain

Scientific classification
- Kingdom: Plantae
- Clade: Tracheophytes
- Clade: Angiosperms
- Clade: Eudicots
- Clade: Rosids
- Order: Brassicales
- Family: Brassicaceae
- Genus: Streptanthus
- Species: S. anceps

Binomial name
- Streptanthus anceps (Payson) Hoover

Synonyms
- Caulanthus anceps Payson; Guillenia lemmonii (Greene) R.Buck; Thelypodium lemmonii Greene

= Streptanthus anceps =

Species of flowering plant

Streptanthus anceps, synonyms Caulanthus anceps and Guillenia lemmonii, is a species of flowering plant in the family Brassicaceae, known by the common name Lemmon's mustard.

It is endemic to California, where it grows on open slopes and plains in the Central Coast Ranges and adjacent Central Valley. It can generally be found in areas with alkaline soils.

== Description ==
Streptanthus anceps is an annual herb that produces an erect, waxy-textured stem with lance-shaped leaves borne on petioles.

The inflorescence is a raceme of many fragrant flowers each with four pink-veined lavender petals. The fruit is a long silique up to 7 centimeters in length.
