= Streptanthus morrisonii =

Conservation status
- Imperiled (NatureServe)

Scientific classification
- Kingdom: Plantae
- Clade: Tracheophytes
- Clade: Angiosperms
- Clade: Eudicots
- Clade: Rosids
- Order: Brassicales
- Family: Brassicaceae
- Genus: Streptanthus
- Species: S. morrisonii

Binomial name
- Streptanthus morrisonii F.W.Hoffm.

Species of flowering plant

Streptanthus morrisonii is an uncommon species of flowering plant in the mustard family known by the common name Morrison's jewelflower. It is endemic to California, where it is known from the North and Central Coast Ranges. It is limited to serpentine soils in chaparral and forest habitat. It is considered a species complex which includes Streptanthus brachiatus. S. morrisonii is divided into four subspecies and is variable. In general, it is a biennial herb producing a hairless, waxy stem up to 1.2 to 1.5 meters in maximum height, often branching at the tip. The basal leaves have fleshy, lance-shaped blades 3 to 5 centimeters long borne on petioles. The blades are gray-green on the upper surface and purple or purple-mottled underneath. Leaves higher on the stem are variable in shape and become smaller toward the top of the plant. Flowers occur at intervals along the upper stem. Each has an urn-shaped calyx of keeled sepals in shades of yellow-green to purple. The petals emerging from the tip are whitish with purple-brown veining. The fruit is a flattened straight or slightly curved silique up to 8 centimeters long.

Threats to this species include boron toxicity from the steam of nearby geothermal power plants.
