= Streptanthus campestris =

Conservation status
- Imperiled (NatureServe)

Scientific classification
- Kingdom: Plantae
- Clade: Tracheophytes
- Clade: Angiosperms
- Clade: Eudicots
- Clade: Rosids
- Order: Brassicales
- Family: Brassicaceae
- Genus: Streptanthus
- Species: S. campestris

Binomial name
- Streptanthus campestris S.Watson

Species of flowering plant

Streptanthus campestris is a species of flowering plant in the mustard family known by the common name southern jewelflower. It is native to southern California and northern Baja California, where it is known from fewer than 20 occurrences scattered between San Bernardino County, California, and Sierra de San Pedro Mártir in northern Baja. It grows in mountain chaparral, woodlands, and forests, at elevations up to 2300 meters (7545 feet). It is a perennial herb producing a thick, few-branched stem up to 1.5 meters tall or more. The basal leaves have fleshy oval blades with bristly, toothed edges which are borne on petioles. Leaves higher up the stem are lance-shaped with smooth or wavy edges and bases that clasp the stem. Flowers occur at intervals on the upper stem. Each has a bell-shaped calyx of bristle-lined purple sepals with four purple tipped yellow petals emerging from the tip. The fruit is a narrow, curving or straight silique which may reach 14 centimeters in length.

The already uncommon plant is moderately threatened by further habitat fragmentation.
