= Streptanthus farnsworthianus =

Scientific classification
- Kingdom: Plantae
- Clade: Tracheophytes
- Clade: Angiosperms
- Clade: Eudicots
- Clade: Rosids
- Order: Brassicales
- Family: Brassicaceae
- Genus: Streptanthus
- Species: S. farnsworthianus

Binomial name
- Streptanthus farnsworthianus J.T.Howell

Species of flowering plant

Streptanthus farnsworthianus is an uncommon species of flowering plant in the mustard family known by the common name Farnsworth's jewelflower. It is endemic to California, where it is limited to the woodlands of the Sierra Nevada foothills. It is an annual herb producing a hairless, waxy, purple or purple-tinged stem up to half a meter tall or more. The ephemeral basal leaves have blades up to 15 centimeters long which are each divided into several narrow lobes or leaflets. Leaves higher on the stem have purple lance-shaped blades that generally clasp the stem at their bases. Flowers occur at intervals along the upper stem with one or two leaflike purple bracts at the base of the raceme. Each flower has an urn-shaped calyx of purple sepals up to a centimeter long. Curling purple-veined white petals emerge from the tip of the calyx. The fruit is a straight or curving silique up to 12 centimeters long.

The plant was named for Evalyn Lucille Klein Farnsworth, a foothills cattle rancher and plant collector who first discovered it growing on her land.
