= Streptanthus barbiger =

Scientific classification
- Kingdom: Plantae
- Clade: Tracheophytes
- Clade: Angiosperms
- Clade: Eudicots
- Clade: Rosids
- Order: Brassicales
- Family: Brassicaceae
- Genus: Streptanthus
- Species: S. barbiger

Binomial name
- Streptanthus barbiger Greene

Species of flowering plant

Streptanthus barbiger is a species of flowering plant in the mustard family known by the common name bearded jewelflower. It is endemic to California, where it is limited to the North Coast Ranges. It grows in woodlands and chaparral habitat, often on serpentine soils. It is an annual herb producing a branching stem up to about 80 centimeters in maximum height. Leaves near the base of the stem are lance-shaped to oval and pointed, usually with toothed edges, the blades measuring up to 7 centimeters long. Leaves higher on the stem may be longer but are narrower and have smooth edges. Flowers occur at intervals along the upper stem. Each has a spherical to urn-shaped calyx of greenish yellow or purple sepals under a centimeter long. Whitish or purple-tinged petals up to a centimeter long emerge from the tip. The fruit is a long, flat, curving silique which may be 7 centimeters in length.
