= Streptanthus gracilis =

Scientific classification
- Kingdom: Plantae
- Clade: Tracheophytes
- Clade: Angiosperms
- Clade: Eudicots
- Clade: Rosids
- Order: Brassicales
- Family: Brassicaceae
- Genus: Streptanthus
- Species: S. gracilis

Binomial name
- Streptanthus gracilis Eastw.

Species of flowering plant

Streptanthus gracilis is an uncommon species of flowering plant in the mustard family known by the common name alpine jewelflower.

== Distribution ==
It is endemic to California, where it is known only from the Kings-Kern Divide in the Sierra Nevada, a series of high mountain peaks near the intersection of Tulare, Fresno, and Inyo Counties. It grows in weathered rocky habitat such as talus.

== Description ==
Streptanthus gracilis is an annual herb producing a slender, hairless, waxy stem up to 30 or 35 centimeters tall. The basal leaves have toothed oblong blades borne on petioles. Leaves higher on the stem have shorter blades which may have short petioles or may clasp the stem at their bases.

Flowers occur at intervals along the upper stem. Each has an urn-shaped calyx of pink sepals about half a centimeter long with pink petals emerging from the tip. The fruit is a thin, straight or curving silique up to 7 centimeters long.
