= Streptanthus insignis =

Scientific classification
- Kingdom: Plantae
- Clade: Tracheophytes
- Clade: Angiosperms
- Clade: Eudicots
- Clade: Rosids
- Order: Brassicales
- Family: Brassicaceae
- Genus: Streptanthus
- Species: S. insignis

Binomial name
- Streptanthus insignis Jeps.

Species of flowering plant

Streptanthus insignis is an uncommon species of flowering plant in the mustard family known by the common names plumed jewelflower and San Benito jewelflower. It is endemic to California, where it is known only from the Inner Central Coast Ranges. It grows in grassland and chaparral habitat, usually on serpentine soils. It is an annual herb producing a hairy, bristly, branching stem up to about 60 centimeters long. The lance-shaped basal leaves are borne on short petioles. Leaves midway up the stem are longer, and those near the top are shorter. They sometimes clasp the stem at their bases. Flowers occur at intervals along the upper stem. The uppermost flowers are often sterile and different in form. Each fertile flower has a bell-shaped calyx of sepals which is purple or greenish-yellow depending on subspecies. The petals at the tip are purplish or yellowish, also depending on subspecies. The fruit is a flat, straight silique which may be over 11 centimeters long.

There are two subspecies. The rarer, Arburua Ranch jewelflower (ssp. lyonii), is known from a just few occurrences near Los Banos. This taxon has greenish yellow flowers, sometimes tinged with purple.
