= Streptanthus batrachopus =

Conservation status
- Critically Imperiled (NatureServe)

Scientific classification
- Kingdom: Plantae
- Clade: Tracheophytes
- Clade: Angiosperms
- Clade: Eudicots
- Clade: Rosids
- Order: Brassicales
- Family: Brassicaceae
- Genus: Streptanthus
- Species: S. batrachopus

Binomial name
- Streptanthus batrachopus J.L.Morrison

Species of flowering plant

Streptanthus batrachopus is a rare species of flowering plant in the mustard family known by the common name Mt. Tamalpais jewelflower. It is endemic to Marin County, California, where it is known only from Mt. Tamalpais and surrounding terrain. There are fewer than ten known occurrences.

Its habitat includes chaparral and coniferous forest, generally on serpentine soils.

== Description ==
It is an annual herb producing a branching or unbranched stem up to about 20 centimeters in maximum height or slightly taller. Leaves near the base of the stem are oval or lance-shaped with toothed edges, somewhat fleshy in texture with a mottled pattern, and no more than 2 to 3 centimeters long. Leaves higher up the stem are lance-shaped.

Flowers occur at intervals along the upper stem. Each has an urn-shaped calyx of purple or greenish sepals up to half a centimeter long. Purple or purple-streaked white petals emerge from the tip. The fruit is a straight or curving silique up to 3 centimeters in length.
