= Streptanthus drepanoides =

Scientific classification
- Kingdom: Plantae
- Clade: Tracheophytes
- Clade: Angiosperms
- Clade: Eudicots
- Clade: Rosids
- Order: Brassicales
- Family: Brassicaceae
- Genus: Streptanthus
- Species: S. drepanoides

Binomial name
- Streptanthus drepanoides Kruckeb. & Morrison

Species of flowering plant

Streptanthus drepanoides is an uncommon species of flowering plant in the mustard family known by the common name sicklefruit jewelflower. It is endemic to California, where it is known from a scattered distribution throughout several mountain ranges in the northern part of the state, including the Klamath Mountains. It is a resident of chaparral and woodlands, generally on serpentine soils. It is an annual herb producing a mostly hairless, waxy stem up to 40 or 45 centimeters tall. The ephemeral basal leaves have round or oval blades, sometimes edged with teeth. Leaves higher on the stem have fleshy oval blades that clasp the stem, the lower ones each measuring up to 9 centimeters long by 7.5 wide. Flowers occur at intervals along the upper stem. Each has an urn-shaped calyx of greenish or yellowish sepals under a centimeter long with whitish or purplish, purple-veined petals emerging from the tip. The fruit is a straight or sickle-shaped curving silique up to 9 centimeters long.
