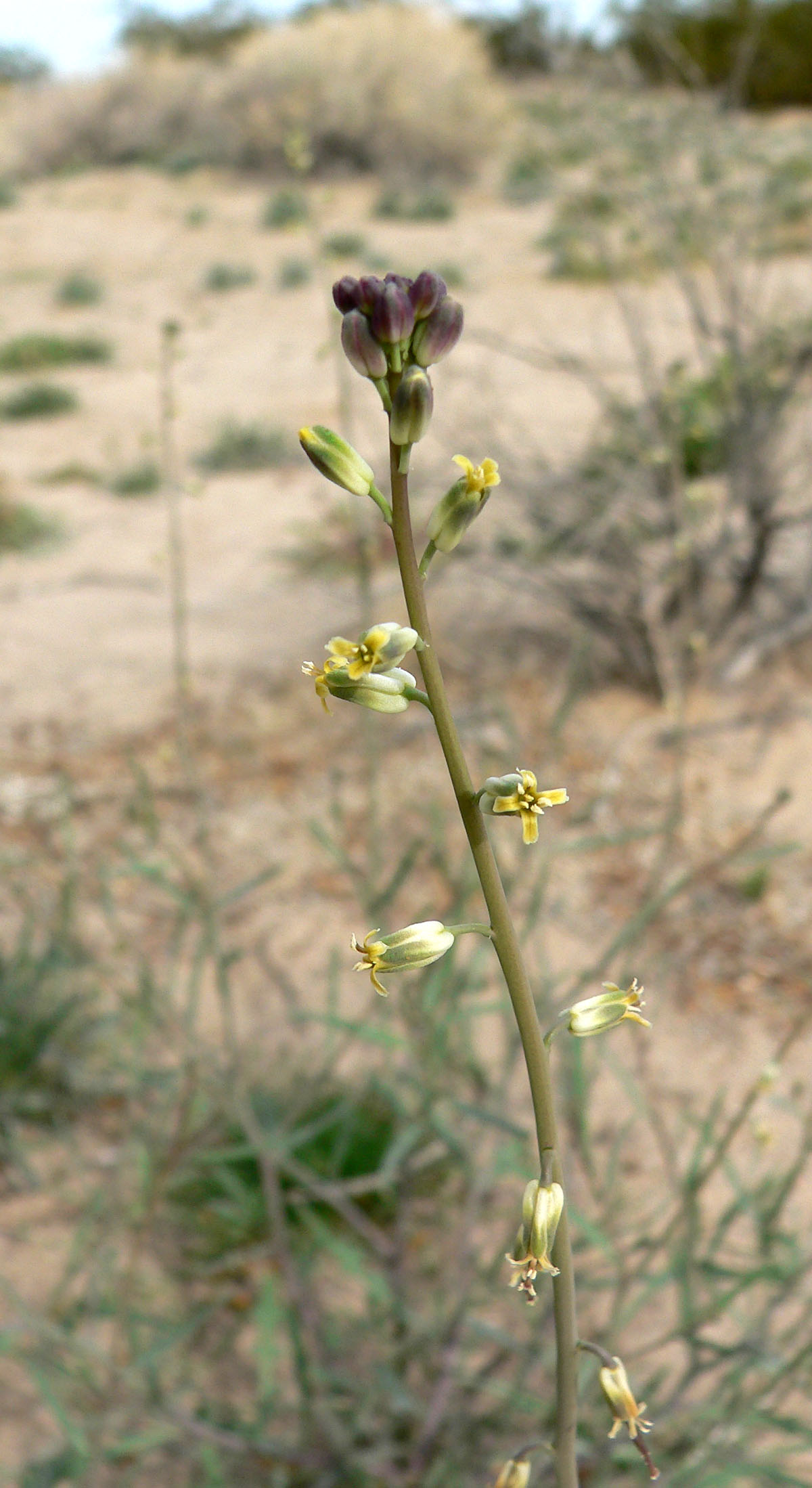

Conservation status
- Secure (NatureServe)

Scientific classification
- Kingdom: Plantae
- Clade: Tracheophytes
- Clade: Angiosperms
- Clade: Eudicots
- Clade: Rosids
- Order: Brassicales
- Family: Brassicaceae
- Genus: Streptanthella; Rydb.
- Species: S. longirostris

Binomial name
- Streptanthella longirostris (S.Watson) Rydb. (1917)

Synonyms
- Arabis longirostris S.Watson (1871); Erysimum longirostre (S.Watson) Kuntze (1891); Euklisia longirostris (S.Watson) Rydb. (1906); Guillenia longirostris (S.Watson) Greene (1906); Streptanthella longirostris var. derelicta J.T.Howell (1937); Streptanthus longirostris (S.Watson) S.Watson (1890); Thelypodium longirostre (S.Watson) Jeps. (1925)

= Streptanthella =

Genus of flowering plants

Streptanthella is a genus of flowering plant in the family Brassicaceae. It includes a single species, Streptanthella longirostris, which is known by the common name longbeak streptanthella, or simply streptanthella. It is native to western North America, where it occurs throughout the western United States and the northwestern states of Mexico. It grows in many types of habitat, including deserts, sagebrush, foothill woodlands, sandy flats, chaparral, and scrubby canyons.

It is an annual herb producing a slender, erect, multibranched stem up to half a meter tall. The lower leaves are lance-shaped with a toothed or smooth edge and leaves higher on the plant are narrower, linear in shape, and less often toothed. The top of the stem is occupied by a long inflorescence which is an open raceme of many flowers. The top of the inflorescence bears the newest buds which are often purple in color. More mature flowers stud the stem at intervals below, each on a short pedicel. Flowers measure under a centimeter long. Each flower is enclosed in four thick sepals. At the tip are the spoon-shaped petals which are white to yellow with purple veining. The fruit is a long, dangling silique up to 7 centimeters in length containing flat, winged seeds.
