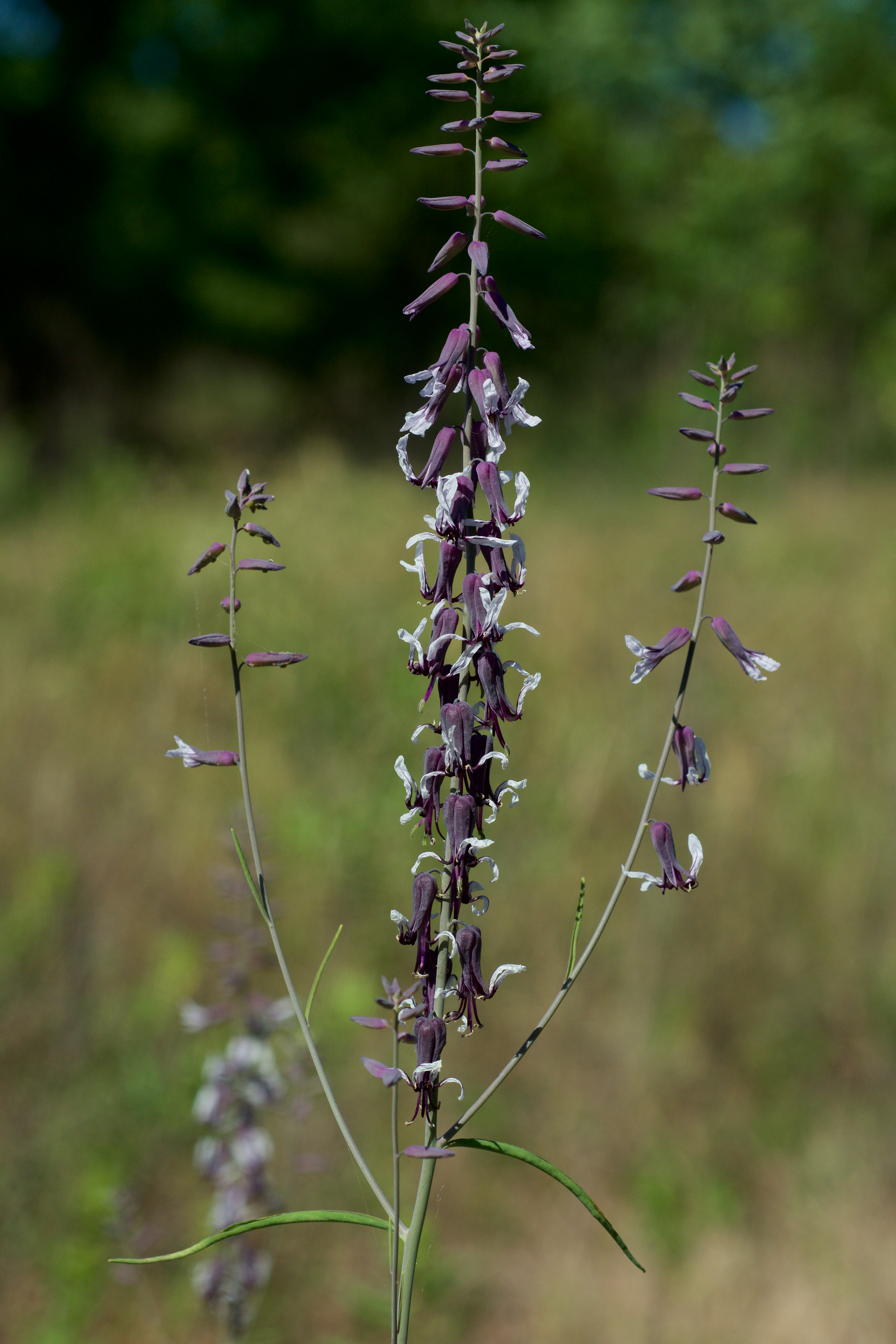

Scientific classification
- Kingdom: Plantae
- Clade: Tracheophytes
- Clade: Angiosperms
- Clade: Eudicots
- Clade: Rosids
- Order: Brassicales
- Family: Brassicaceae
- Genus: Streptanthus
- Species: S. hyacinthoides

Binomial name
- Streptanthus hyacinthoides Hook.

= Streptanthus hyacinthoides =

Species of flowering plant

Streptanthus hyacinthoides is a species of flowering plant in the mustard family known by the common name smooth jewelflower. It is found in Texas, Arkansas, Oklahoma, Louisiana and Nebraska, occurring in prairies, grasslands, and roadsides. The specific name hyacinthoides is Greek, referring to the resemblance of the species to the genus Hyacinthus, and the common name "smooth jewelflower" refers to the glabrous stems of the plant.

== Description ==
Streptanthus hyacinthoides is an annual herb, growing as high as 4 ft (1.2 m). The sessile or nearly sessile leaves are linear to lanceolate. The leaves are typically cauline and measure 6 in (150 mm) long to 2.75 in (70 mm) wide. The actinomorphic flowers are clustered in crowded racemes. The flowers are 1 in (25 mm) wide with 0.5 in (13 mm) long pedicels. The sepals are purple and the four petals of each flower are purple or white with purple veins. The ovoid seeds are about 0.065 in (1.7 mm) long and 0.045 in (1.1 mm) wide.
