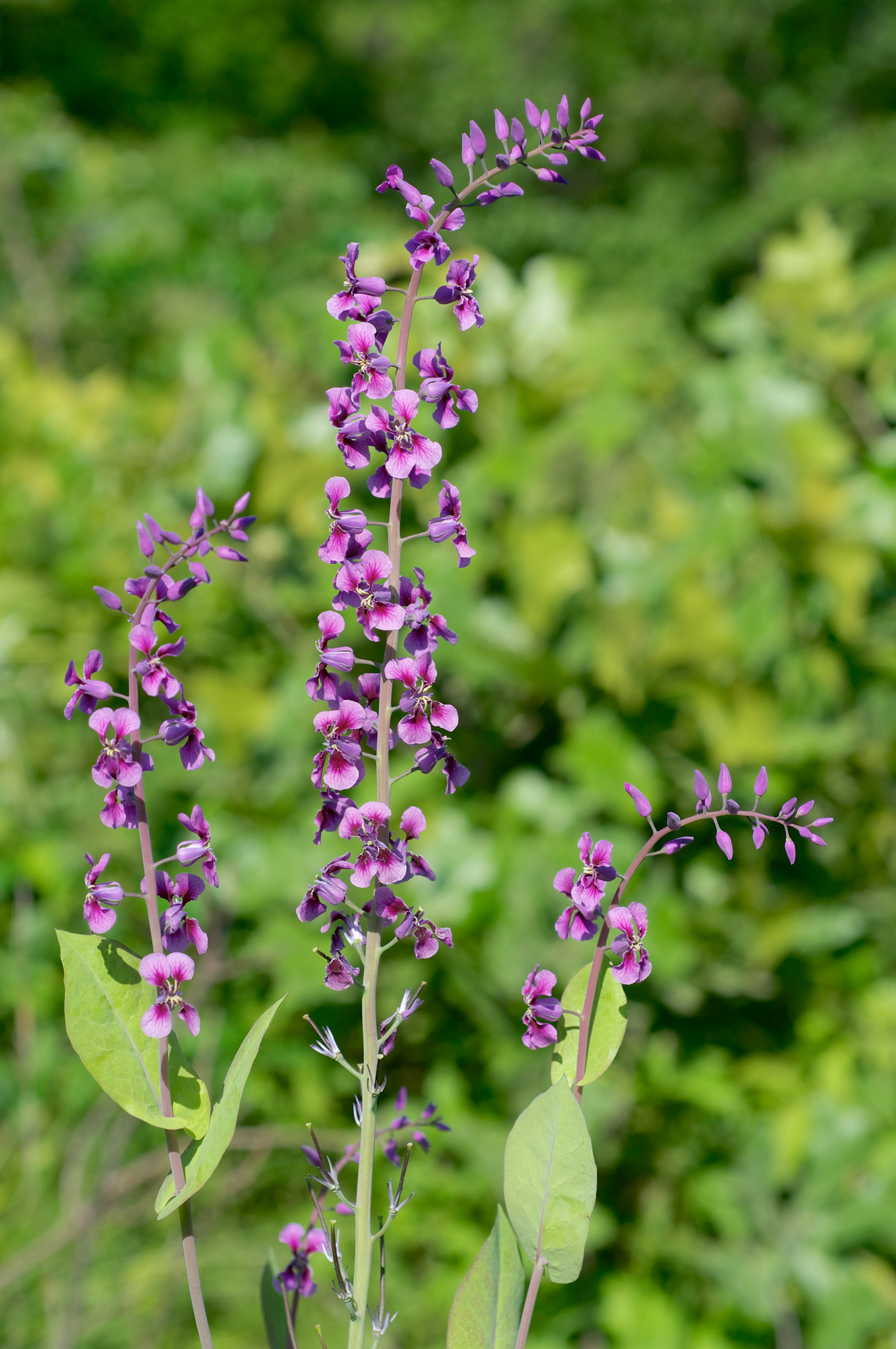

Scientific classification
- Kingdom: Plantae
- Clade: Tracheophytes
- Clade: Angiosperms
- Clade: Eudicots
- Clade: Rosids
- Order: Brassicales
- Family: Brassicaceae
- Genus: Streptanthus
- Species: S. maculatus

Binomial name
- Streptanthus maculatus Nutt.

= Streptanthus maculatus =

Species of flowering plant

Streptanthus maculatus is a species of flowering plant in the mustard family known by the common name clasping jewelflower. It is found in Texas, Arkansas and Oklahoma. It is the type species for the genus.
