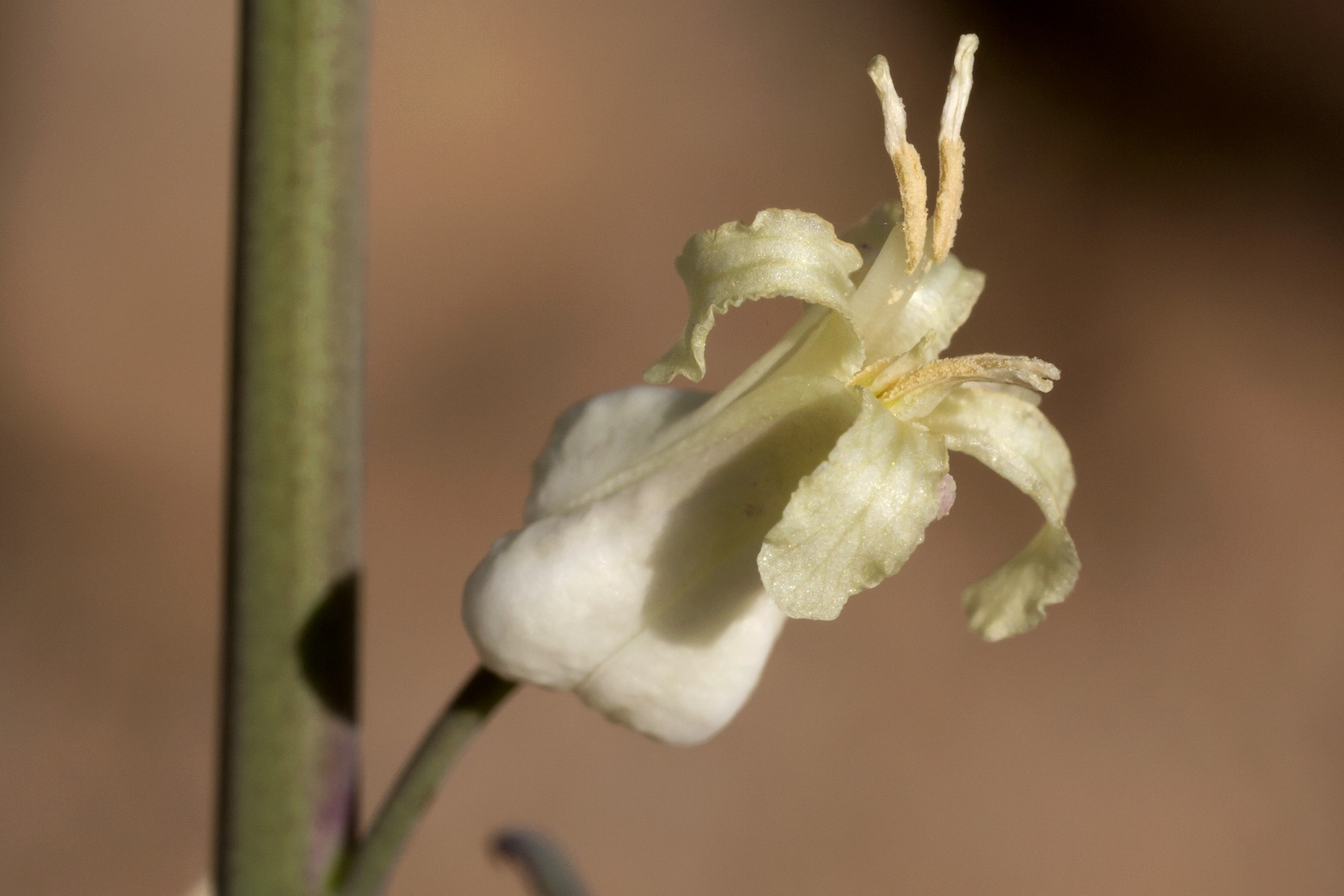

Scientific classification
- Kingdom: Plantae
- Clade: Tracheophytes
- Clade: Angiosperms
- Clade: Eudicots
- Clade: Rosids
- Order: Brassicales
- Family: Brassicaceae
- Genus: Streptanthus
- Species: S. carinatus

Binomial name
- Streptanthus carinatus C.Wright ex A.Gray

Synonyms
- Disaccanthus carinatus (C.Wright ex A.Gray) Greene; Erysimum carinatum (C.Wright ex A.Gray) Kuntze

= Streptanthus carinatus =

Species of flowering plant

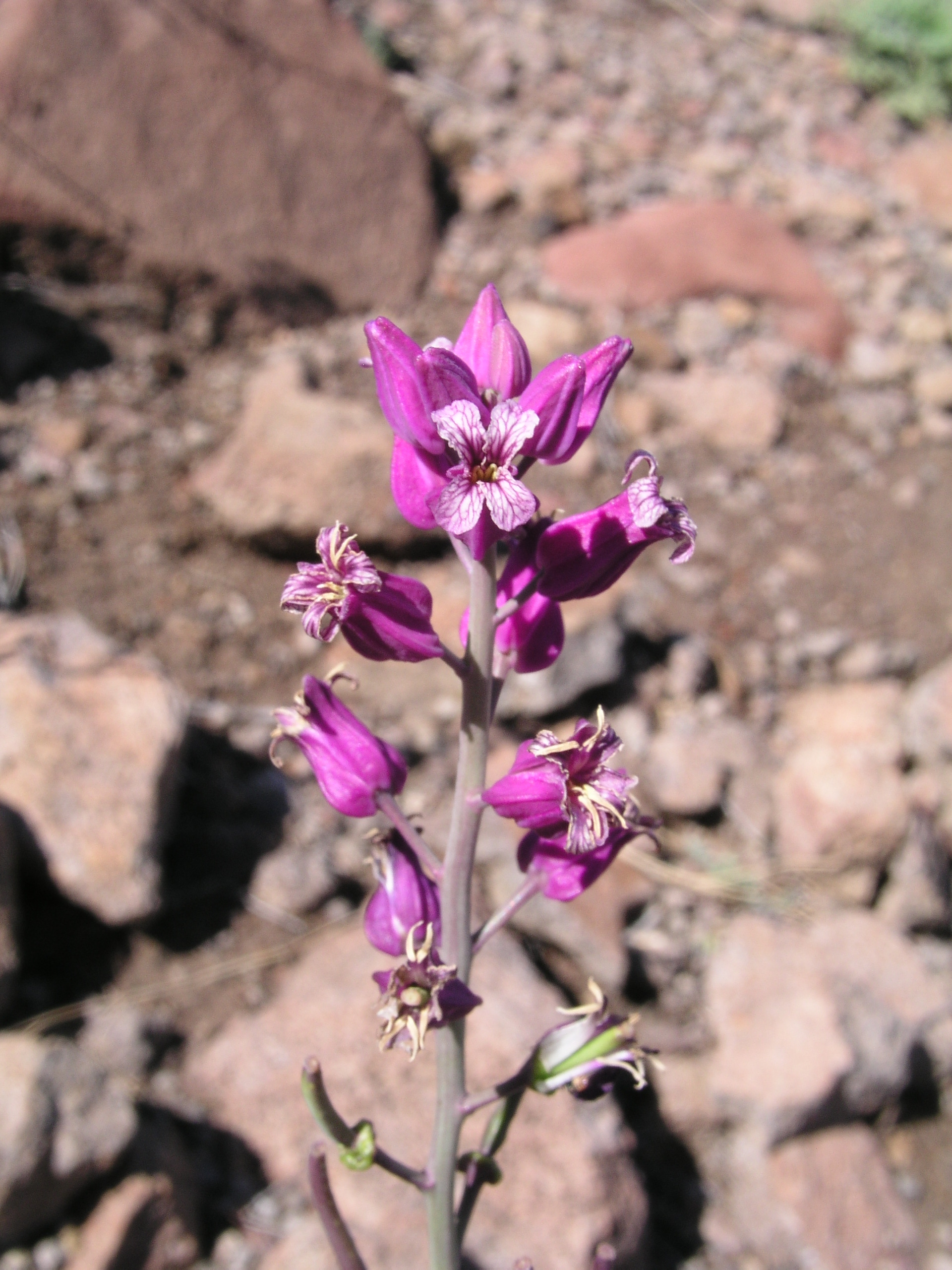
The purple flowers of Streptanthus carinatus var. carinatus

Streptanthus carinatus, the lyreleaf jewelflower, is an annual to biennial plant in the mustard family (Brassicaceae) found in the Arizona Upland of the Sonoran Desert. Subspecies S. carinatus arizonicus has white to cream colored flowers in its western range, becoming strongly yellow eastward. Subspecies S. carinatus carinatus has purple flowers.
