= Streptanthus brachiatus =

Conservation status
- Imperiled (NatureServe)

Scientific classification
- Kingdom: Plantae
- Clade: Tracheophytes
- Clade: Angiosperms
- Clade: Eudicots
- Clade: Rosids
- Order: Brassicales
- Family: Brassicaceae
- Genus: Streptanthus
- Species: S. brachiatus

Binomial name
- Streptanthus brachiatus F.W.Hoffm.

Species of flowering plant

Streptanthus brachiatus is a species of flowering plant in the mustard family known by the common name Socrates Mine jewelflower. It is endemic to the Inner North Coast Ranges of California north of the San Francisco Bay Area. It can be found in chaparral and woodland habitat, often on serpentine soils, in Sonoma, Lake, and Napa Counties. It is a biennial herb producing a branching stem up to about 60 centimeters in maximum height. There is a basal rosette of fleshy purple-green leaves around the base, each with a sharp-toothed, widely lance-shaped blade up to 4 centimeters long. Leaves higher on the stem vary in shape. Flowers occur at intervals along the upper stem. Each has an urn-shaped calyx of keeled yellowish or purplish sepals just under a centimeter long. White, purple, or purple-veined white petals emerge from the tip. The fruit is a thin, narrow silique which may be up to 6 centimeters in length.
