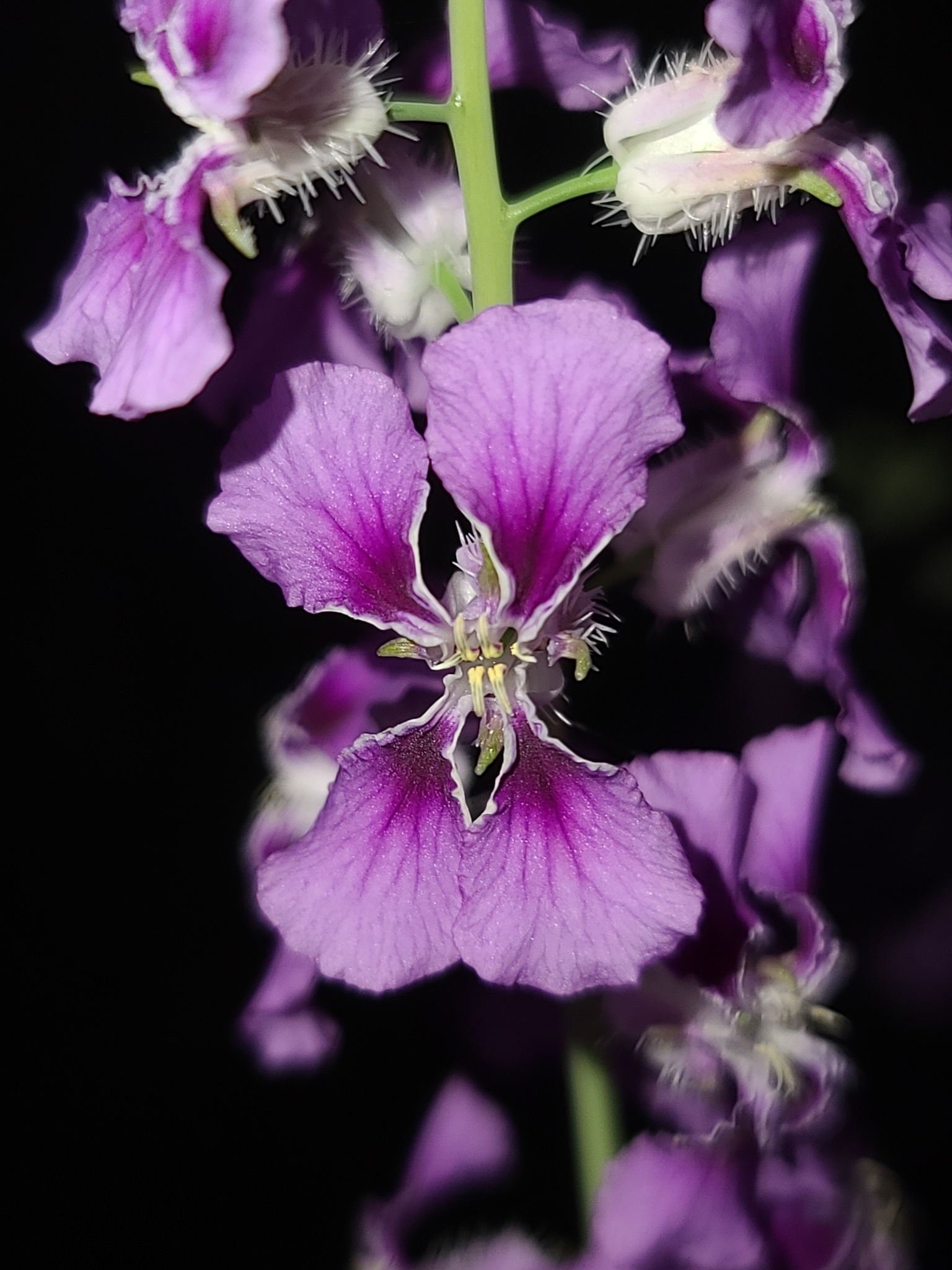

Conservation status
- Imperiled (NatureServe)

Scientific classification
- Kingdom: Plantae
- Clade: Tracheophytes
- Clade: Angiosperms
- Clade: Eudicots
- Clade: Rosids
- Order: Brassicales
- Family: Brassicaceae
- Genus: Streptanthus
- Species: S. squamiformis

Binomial name
- Streptanthus squamiformis Goodman

= Streptanthus squamiformis =

Species of flowering plant

Streptanthus squamiformis is a species of flowering plant in the mustard family known by the common names pine-oak jewelflower or Goodman's jewelflower. It is a narrow endemic to Oklahoma and Arkansas.
