= Silique =

Type of seed capsule, with the length more than three times the width

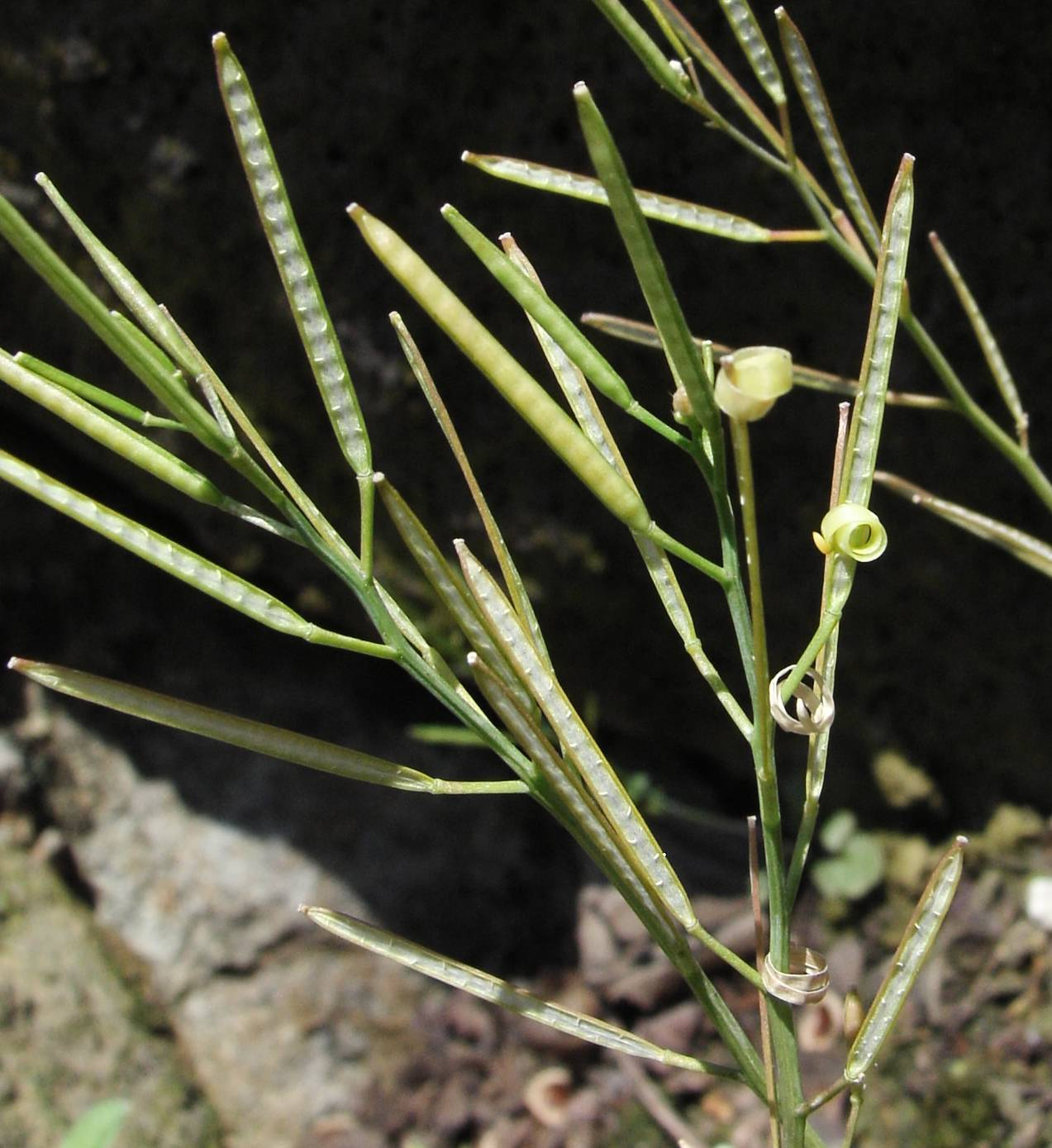
Siliquae of Cardamine impatiens

A silique or siliqua (pl. siliques or siliquae) is a type of fruit (seed capsule) having two fused carpels with the length being more than three times the width. When the length is less than three times the width of the dried fruit it is referred to as a silicle. The outer walls of the ovary (the valves) usually separate when ripe, then being named dehiscent, and leaving a persistent partition (the replum). Siliques are present in many members of the mustard family, Brassicaceae, but some species have silicles instead. Some species closely related to plants with true siliques have fruits with a similar structure that do not open when ripe; these are usually called indehiscent siliques (compare dehiscence).

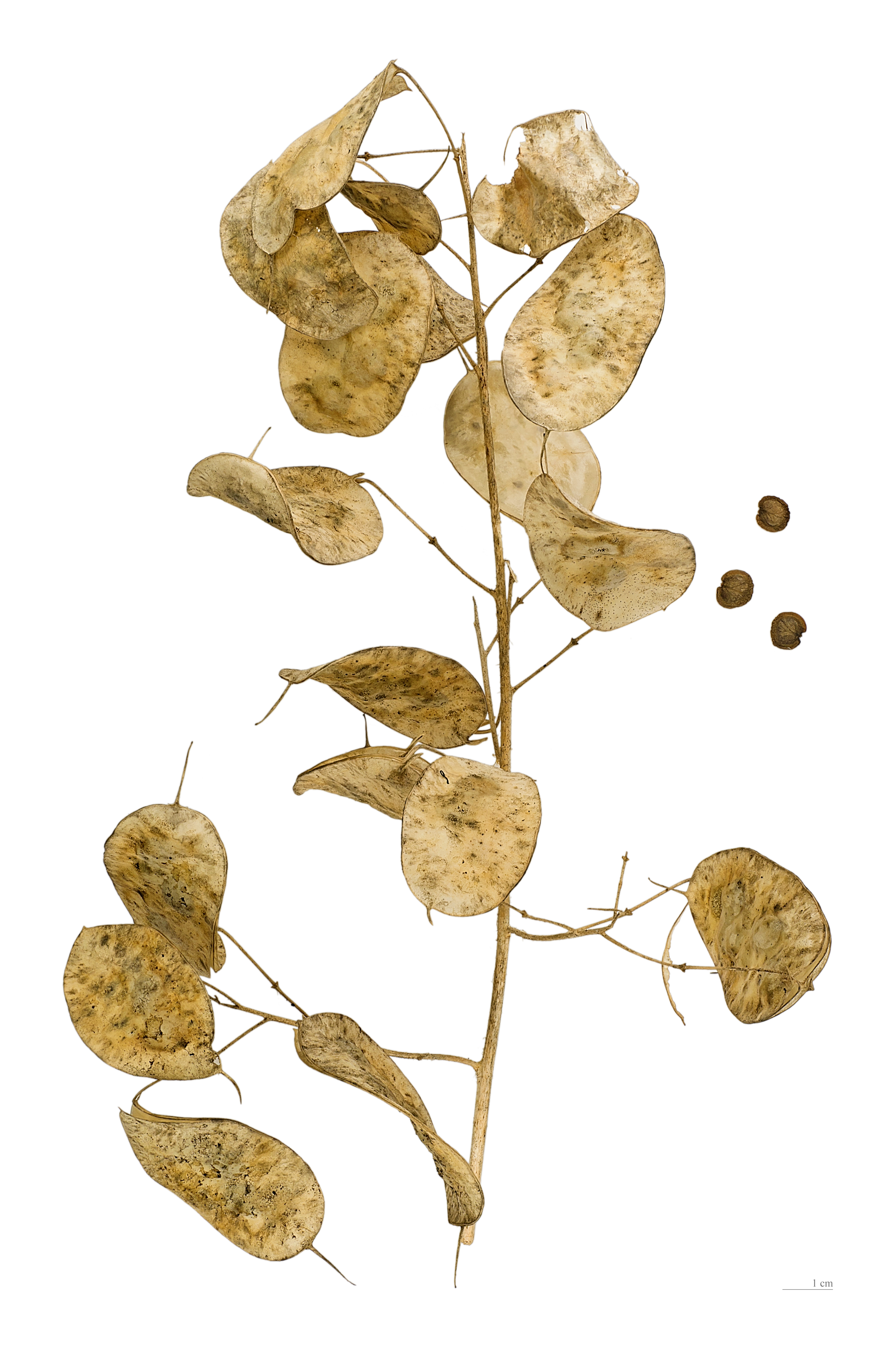
Silicles of Lunaria annua – MHNT

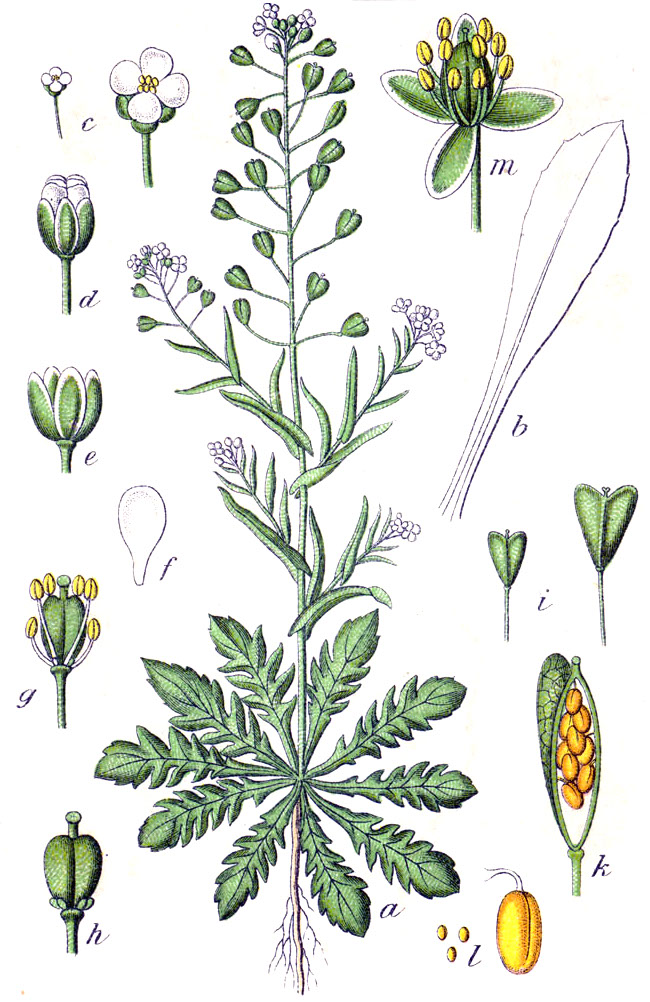
Capsella bursa-pastoris with silicles

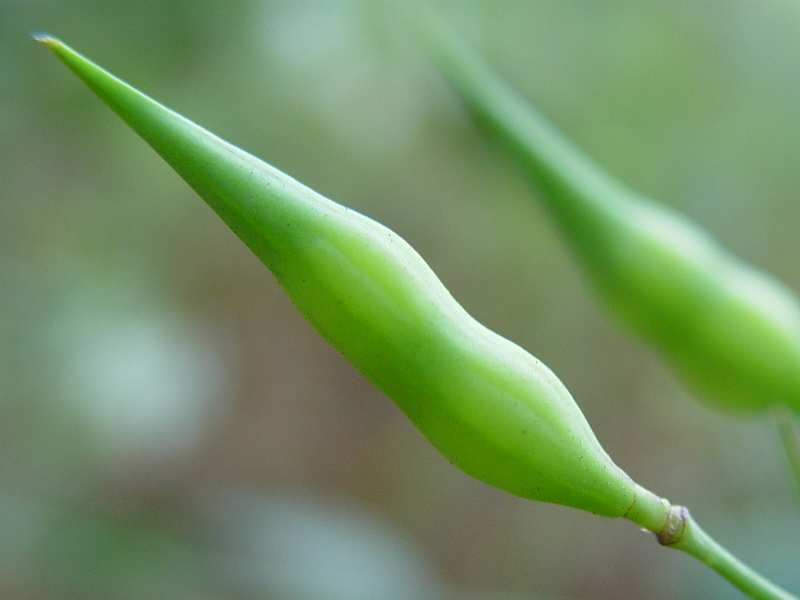
Indehiscent siliques of radish Raphanus sativus

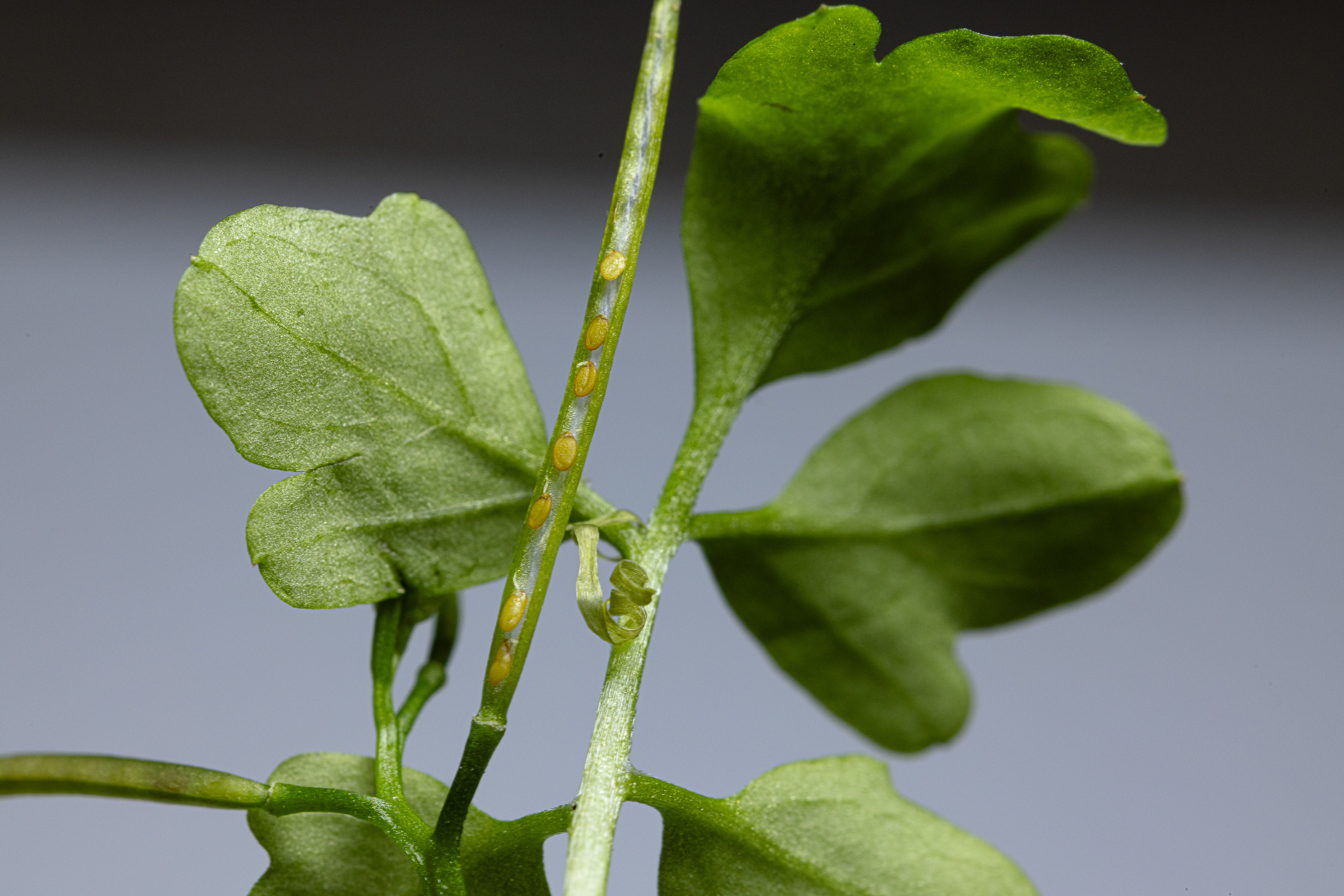
Silique with seeds of Cardamine occulta

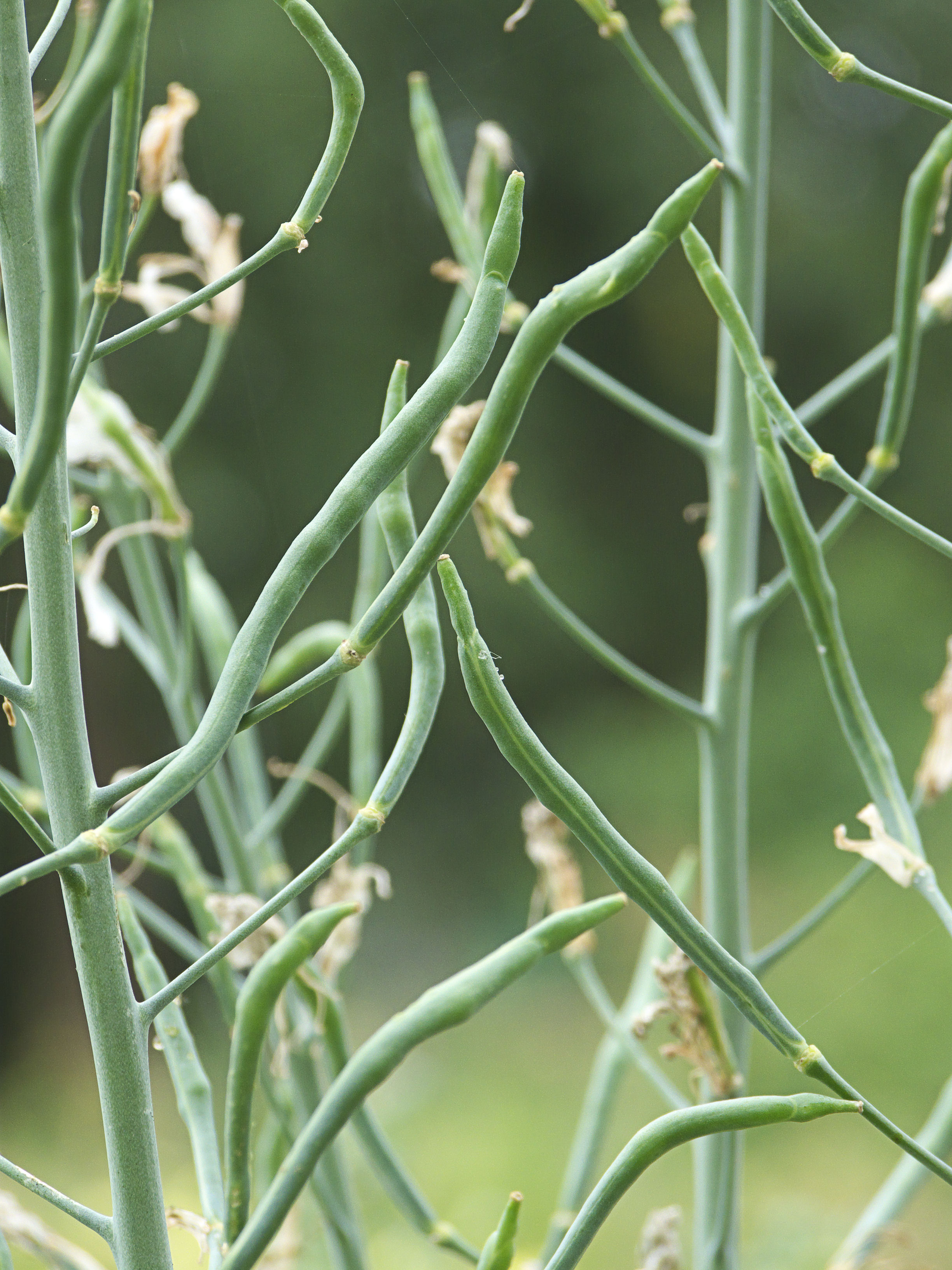
Siliques of the broccoli plant.

== See also ==
- Legume – a fruit type that somewhat resembles a silique, but is derived from one carpel that typically splits along two sides.
