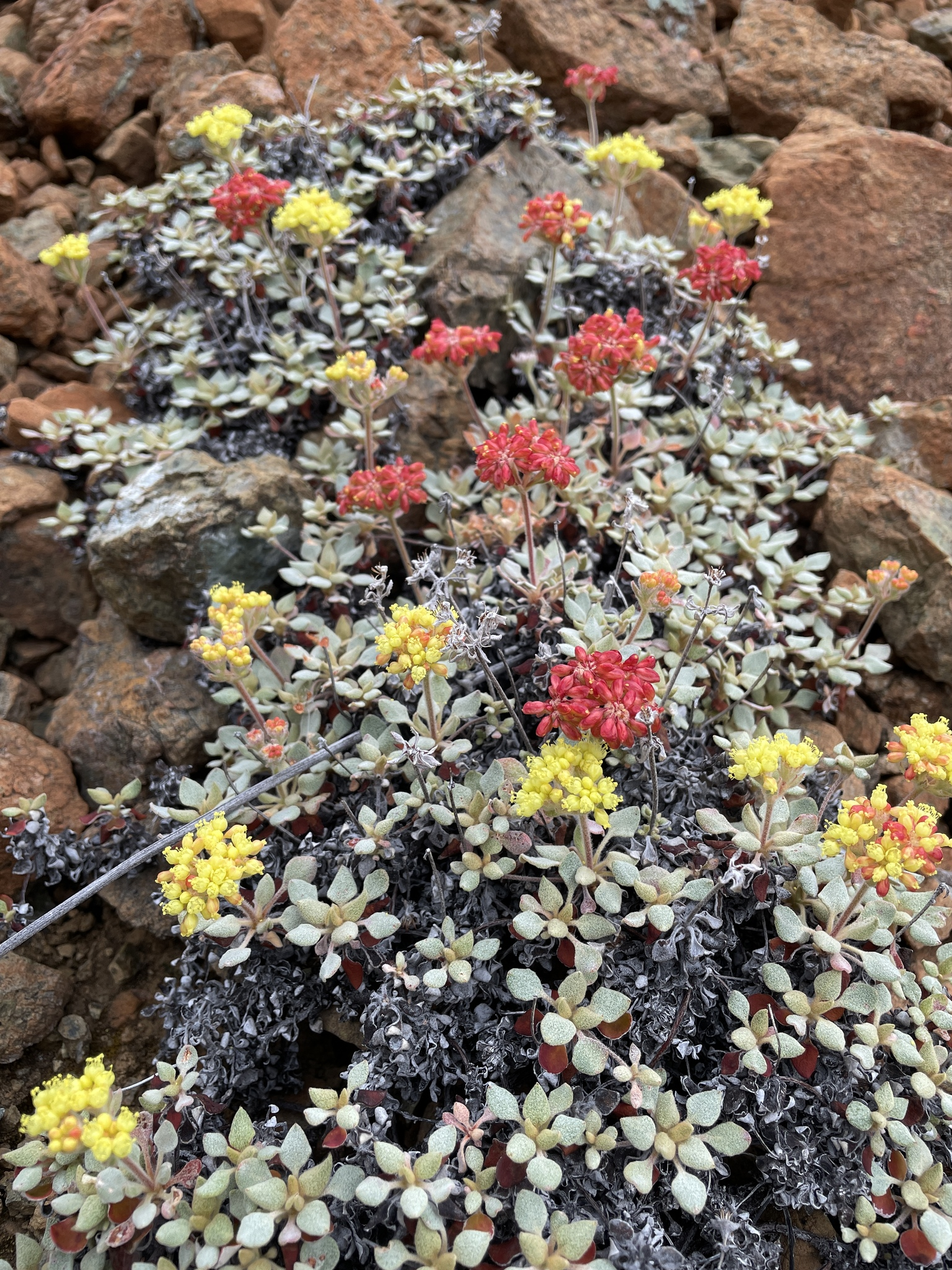

Conservation status
- Critically Imperiled (NatureServe)

Scientific classification
- Kingdom: Plantae
- Clade: Embryophytes
- Clade: Tracheophytes
- Clade: Angiosperms
- Clade: Eudicots
- Order: Caryophyllales
- Family: Polygonaceae
- Genus: Eriogonum
- Species: E. cedrorum

Binomial name
- Eriogonum cedrorum Reveal & Raiche

= Eriogonum cedrorum =

Species of wild buckwheat

Eriogonum cedrorum is a rare species of wild buckwheat known by the common name The Cedars buckwheat. It is endemic to Sonoma County, California where it is known only from the Cedars, an unincorporated area outside of Guerneville near Cazadero.

== Distribution ==
The Cedars is known for its botanical riches, including the endemic plant species Cedars fairy lantern and serpentine fleabane. The habitat is a serpentine canyon surrounded by non-serpentine terrain and many rare serpentine-endemic plants are isolated within. Much of the flora is also adapted to alkaline conditions, growing among seeps of mineral-rich waters that can have a pH up to 11. It can be found in three locations with an estimated 1500 to 2000 individuals in existence.

== Description ==
Eriogonum cedrorum is a mat-forming perennial herb growing up to half a meter wide with hairy or woolly herbage. It has a woody taproot and caudex unit covered in rosettes of leaves each up to 1.5 centimeters long by 1 wide. The inflorescence arises on an erect stem up to 8 centimeters. The inflorescence itself is a cluster of yellow flowers that quickly turn dark red. The stamens are tipped with yellow anthers.

== Taxonomy ==
This species of buckwheat was first collected in 1947 and described to science as a new species in 2009. It was scientifically described by James L. Reveal and Roger Edward Raiche in the Eriogonum genus within the Polygonaceae family. It has no botanical synonyms.
