= The Cedars (Sonoma County, California) =

Canyon in the United States

- Interactive map of The Cedars
- Type: Ecological Preserve
- Location: Sonoma County, California
- Nearest town: Cazadero, California
- Coordinates: 38.6213°N 123.1231°W
- Area: 7,500 acres (3,000 ha)
- Administrator: Sonoma Land Trust
- Website: sonomalandtrust.org/our-preserve-system/ecological-preserves/the-cedars-gateway/

The Cedars is an unincorporated area containing a serpentine canyon and ecological preserve located in northwestern Sonoma County, California adjacent to the Austin Creek. The canyon system and surrounding ultramafic mass spans approximately 7,500 acres in a remote area of the county, north of Cazadero.

== Geology ==
The area is formed from a chunk of peridotite rock from the Earth's mantle. When the Farallon plate subducted under the North American plate around 40 million years ago, an accretionary wedge formed from fractured peridotite chunk mixed with uplifted sea crust. This reaction hydrated the peridotite, triggering serpentinization.

== Ecology ==
Geologic and climatic features of The Cedars give rise to a distinct local ecology. These features include the ultramafic serpentine rock and soils derived from it, which have an imbalance of magnesium to calcium and are poor in some nutrients important for plant growth, and a local climate with high winter rainfall and unusually warm summer temperatures. The Cedars is home distinct plant communities, which include several species endemic to serpentine soils, like Sargent cypress (Hesperocyparis sargentii), and several locally endemic serpentine-adapted plants including Arctostaphylos bakeri subsp. sublaevis, Calochortus raichei, Erigeron serpentinus, Eriogonum cedrorum, Streptanthus glandulosus subsp. hoffmannii, and Holodiscus discolor var. cedrorum.

== History and archaeology ==
Although the area was known to settlers coming to the area in the 1880s, the land was undeveloped until miners discovered chromite and magnesite deposits. This discovery led to the establishment of several mines that remained in use until the end of World War II. From the late 19th century onwards, the area was referred to by locals as "Red Slide." However, by the 1940s, an official name, "The Cedars" was proposed. This name is a misnomer, as it actually refers to the forests of Sargent cypress, a tree only found in the serpentine soils of Northern California. Now, the "Red Slide" name refers to a particularly prominent serpentine barren.

In 1999, the botanist Roger Raiche and David McCrory purchased a 520-acre segment of the land with the express purpose of preserving the fragile natural environment. In 2007, the property was authorized by the California Coastal Conservancy for the Sonoma Land Trust to develop a conservation plan. By 2012, the property was purchased and transferred to the Bureau of Land Management. Since then, this land has functioned as a research area for the California Native Plant Society and other scientific organizations.

== Notable features ==
=== Mineral Falls ===
Mineral Falls is a 20-foot waterfall whose rock face is covered in thick layers of calcium carbonate from the extremely high pH levels in ultrabasic springs above it. The calcium build-up around the waterfall has been dated to around 5,000 years old. The waterfall empties into a series of terraced ponds below also coated with calcium carbonate.
