= Venado =

Venado may refer to:

- Venado, California
- Venado, San Carlos, Costa Rica
- Venado, San Luis Potosí, Mexico
- Venado, a supercomputer at Los Alamos National Laboratory
- Venado Peak, mountain after which the supercomputer is named
