= V. bakeri =

V. bakeri may refer to:

- Vanilla bakeri, a plant species found in Cuba
- Vermicularia bakeri, a plant pathogen
- Viola bakeri, a flowering plant species

== See also ==
- Bakeri (disambiguation)
