= Venado, California =

Unincorporated community in California, United States

- Unincorporated community
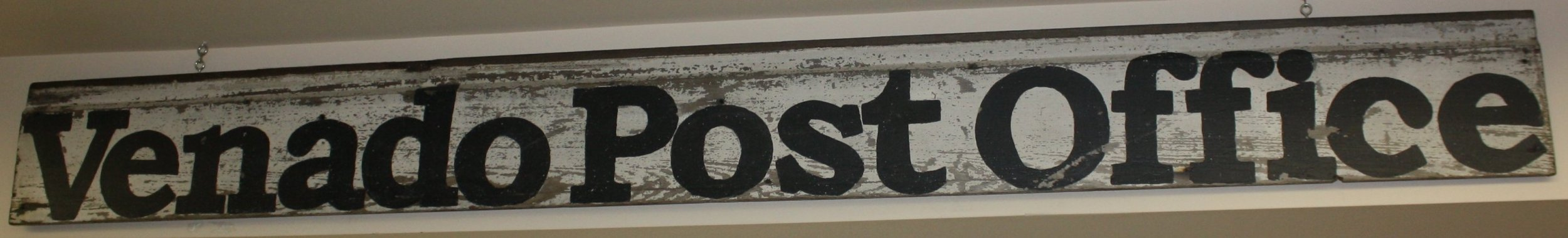
- at the Healdsburg Museum

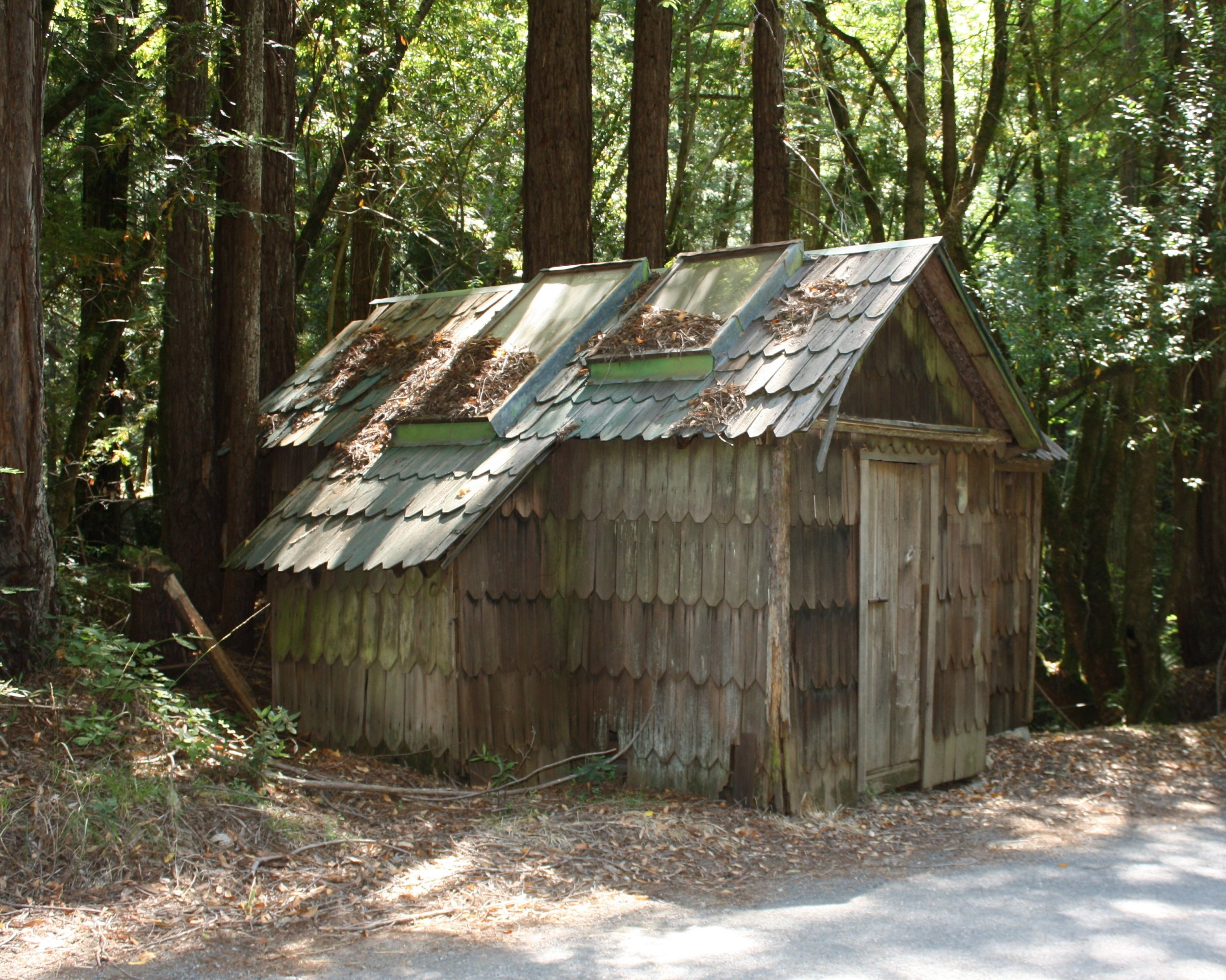
- Venado Post Office on Mill Creek Road

- Location within California Location within the United States
- Coordinates: 38°36′20″N 123°00′29″W
- Country: United States
- State: California
- County: Sonoma
- Elevation: 1,102 ft (336 m)
- Time zone: UTC-8 (Pacific (PST))
  - Summer (DST): UTC-7 (PDT)
- Area code: 707
- GNIS feature ID: 1656386

Venado (Spanish for "deer") is an unincorporated community in Sonoma County, California, United States, and is located about 12 miles west of Healdsburg, along Mill Creek Road, below the north slope of Knoll Ridge, on the south bank of Gray Creek, at an elevation of 1,102 feet. The community had a post office from 1921 to 1941. Venado was devastated by the Walbridge Fire in 2020, part of the larger LNU Lightning Complex fire. The Walbridge Fire destroyed many homes and structures in the area, including the Venado Post Office and Daniels School.

== History ==
The history of this area goes back to the 1860s when it was first settled by the Gray family. Venado was named by Stillman Batchellor, who served as postmaster, when a fourth class post office was established on May 7, 1921. Deliveries were three times a week, on Monday, Wednesday, and Friday. The service included mail in general with parcel post packages delivered to all patrons in the district, who must supply their own mail sacks made of heavy canvas material, being about two feet long, with a twenty-inch opening at the mouth, with the names and post office address printed or stamped thereon, along with a post or hook near the road in front of the house so the driver can hang the mail bag on the post without getting out of his vehicle.

The original post office building burned to the ground, and was replaced by one still standing, decaying under the redwoods. It is located on Mill Creek Road, 9.1 miles west of its junction with Westside Road. This post office was discontinued on November 15, 1941 with service transferred 12 miles east to Healdsburg, California.

Batchellor was a mining engineer turned fruitgrower, who settled in the area in the early 1900s after working in Cuba and Mexico. He owned an 11,000 acre ranch, which had land that when cleared, proved to be fine fruit land, with vineyards and prune orchards taking the place of redwood groves.

After 1863, California state law encouraged the building of schoolhouses three miles apart to accommodate the horse and buggy transportation, and a total of 15 one room schoolhouses were built by the early settlers of the small communities near Healdsburg. However, beginning in 1936, the one room schools began to unionize, and by 1951 only 5 one room schools remained.

Daniels School is over 120 years old, and is located on Mill Creek Road, across the road from Mill Creek, 2 miles east of Venado's post office, and about 10 miles west of Healdsburg, at an elevation of around 600 feet. Mill Creek parallels the road at this point, and flows by with the road and school on its right.

Daniels is a one-room school, measuring 284 square feet, and had one female teacher who taught first through eighth grades, but closed in 1951 due to lack of students. The original school building is still standing, and restoration is being planned by the Venado Historical Society. Known at first as Davis School, it was renamed in 1907 when R. A. Daniels agreed to move the school to its present location.

=== Daniels School Photo Tour ===
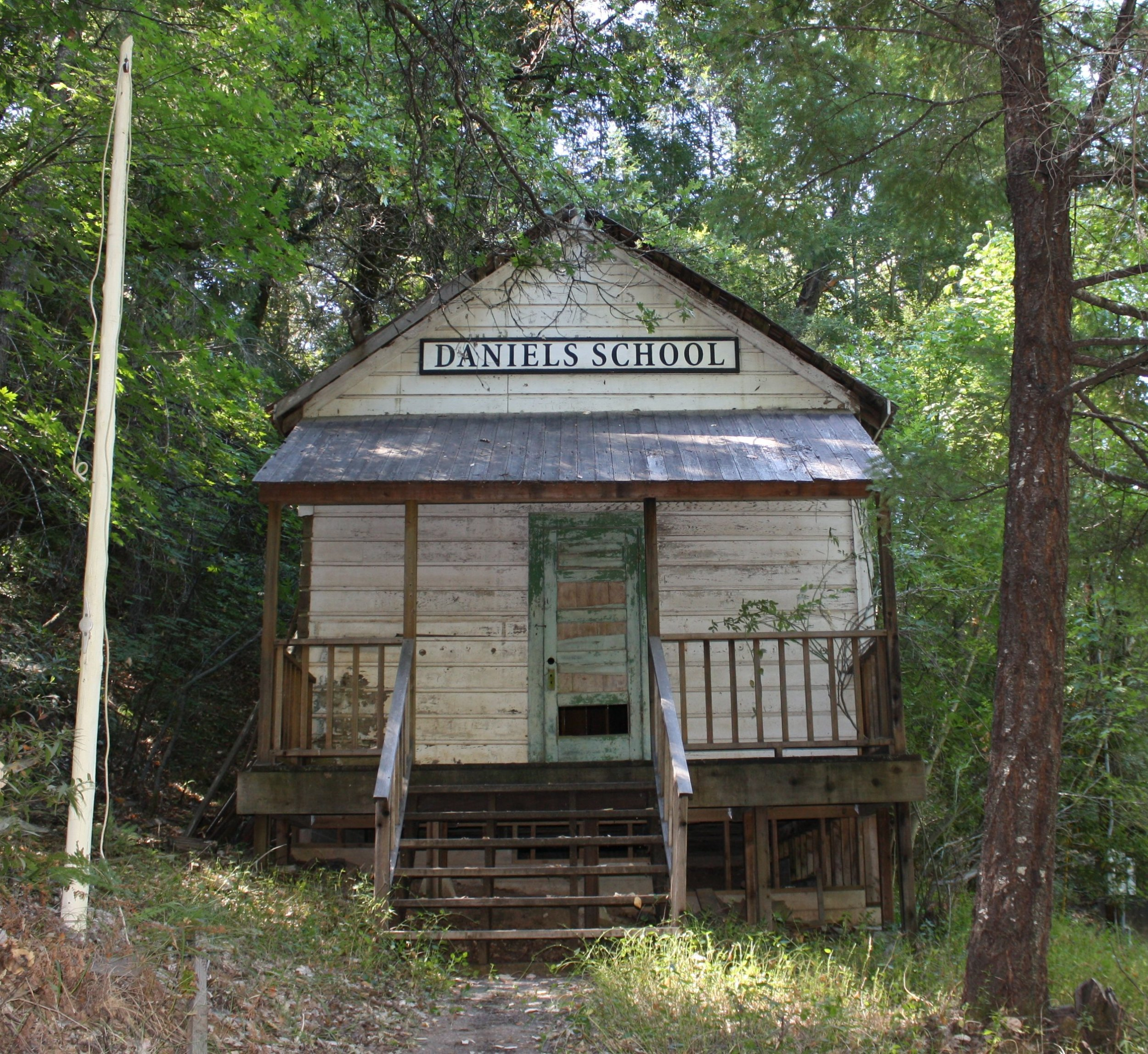
Daniels School - Venado's one room schoolhouse on Mill Creek Road

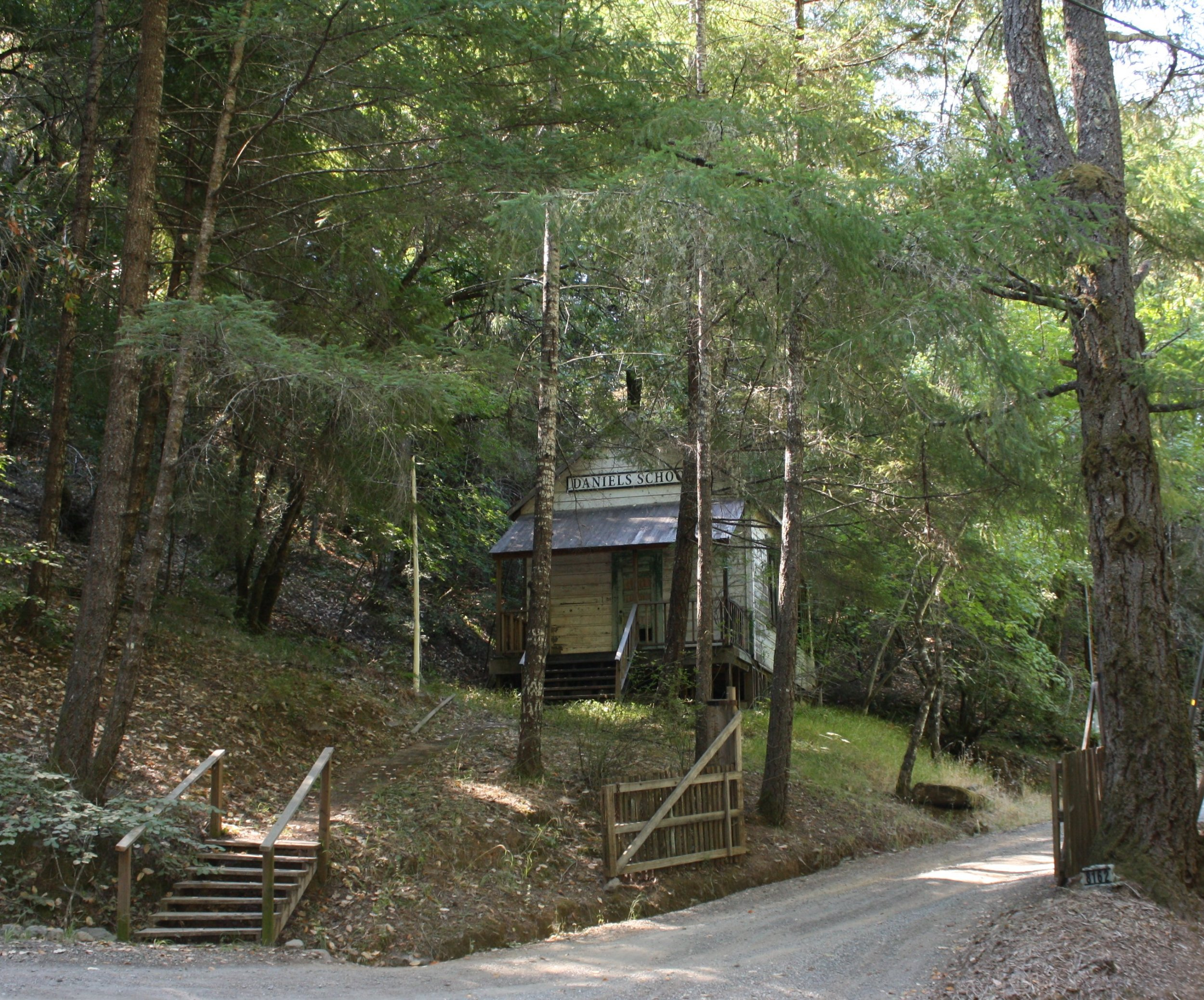
Daniels School from Mill Creek Road

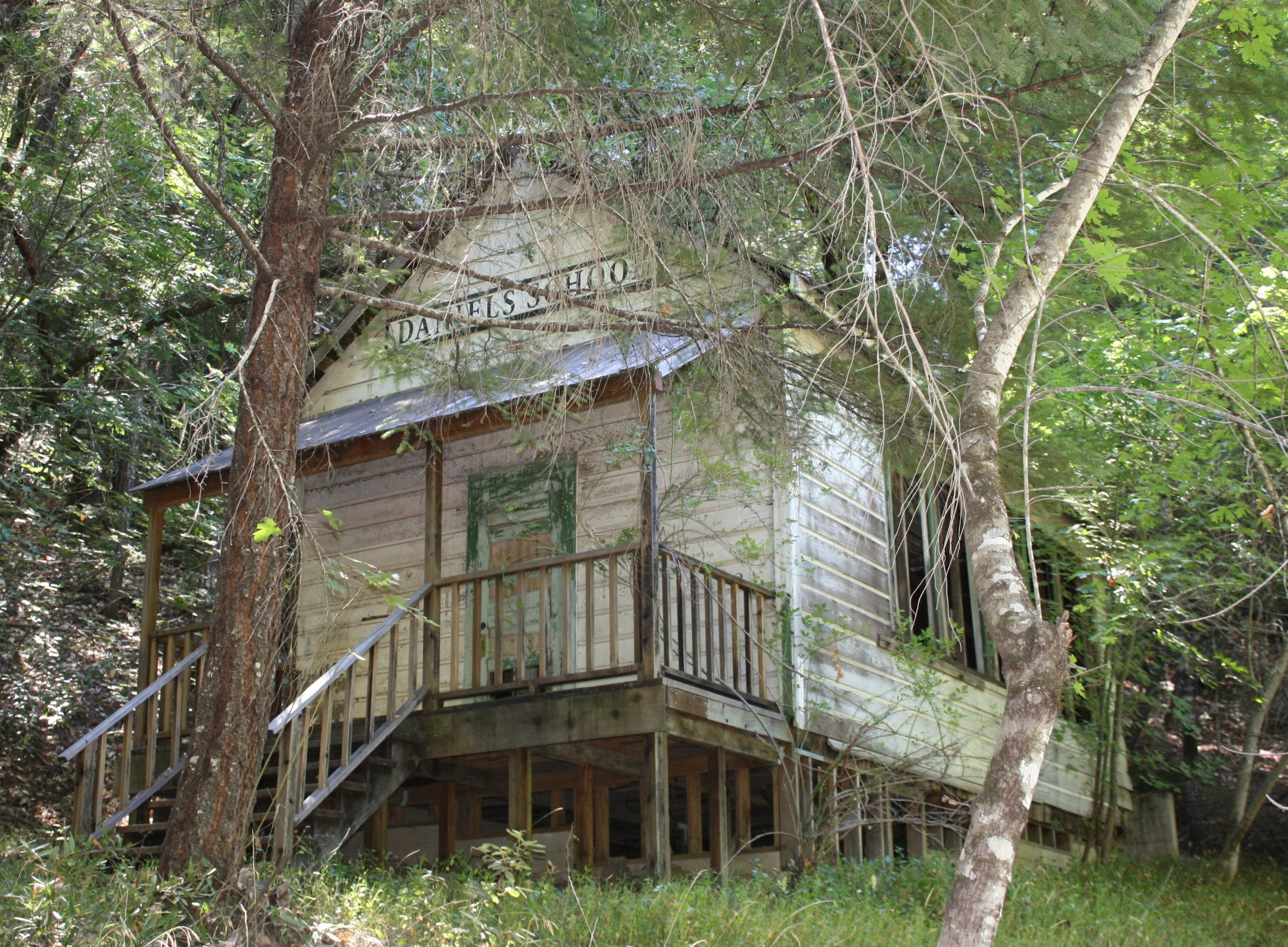
foundation

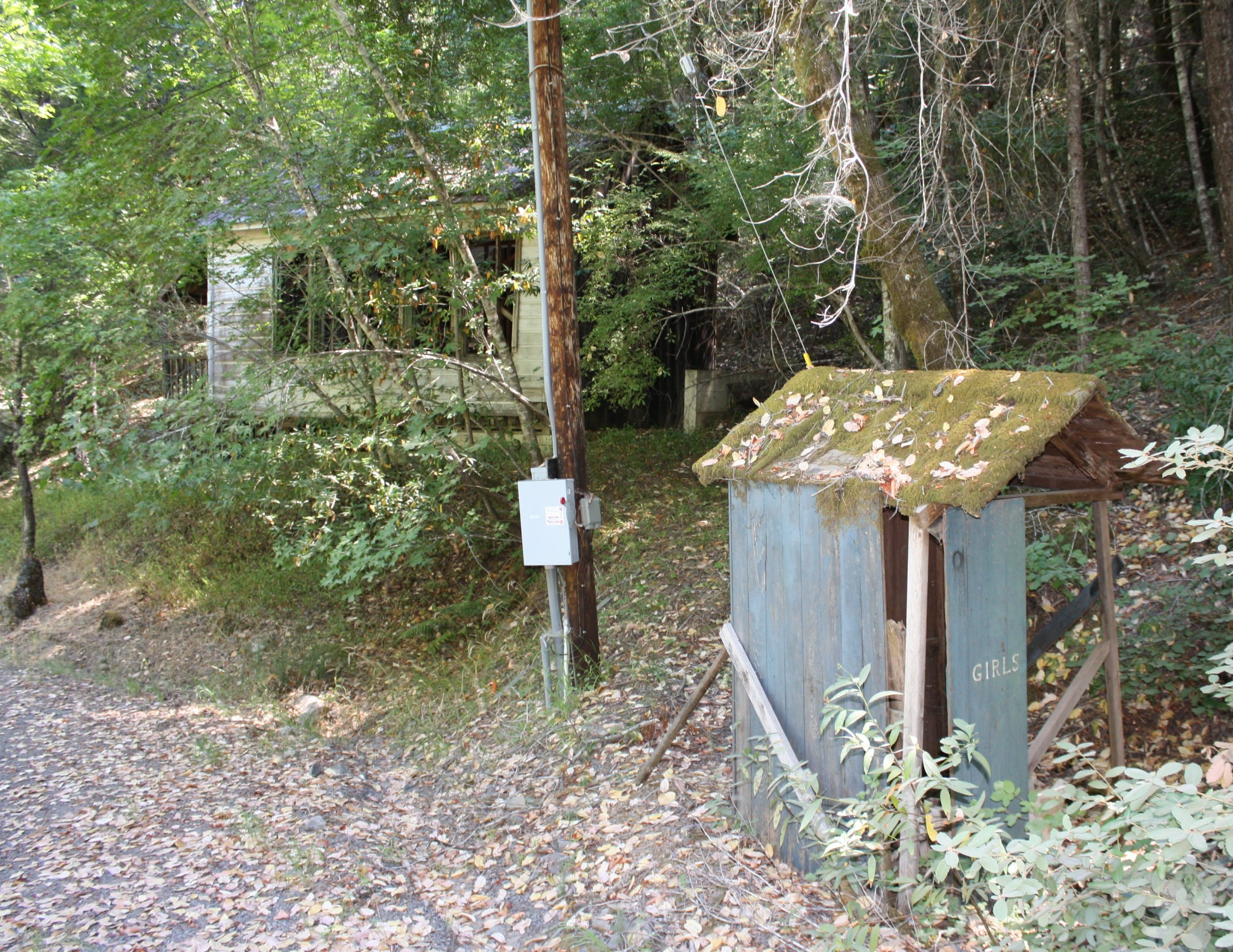
from side road

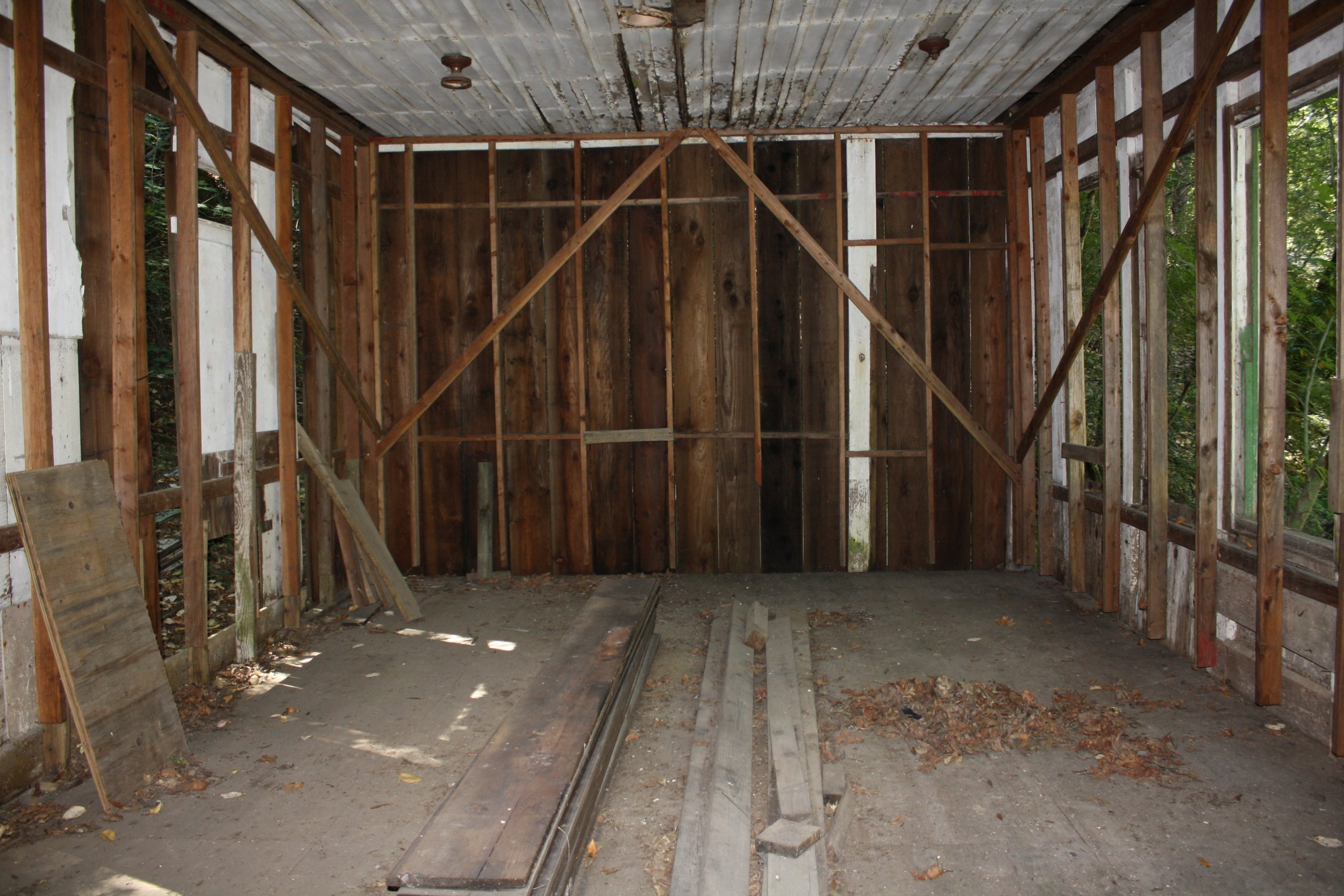
inside back wall

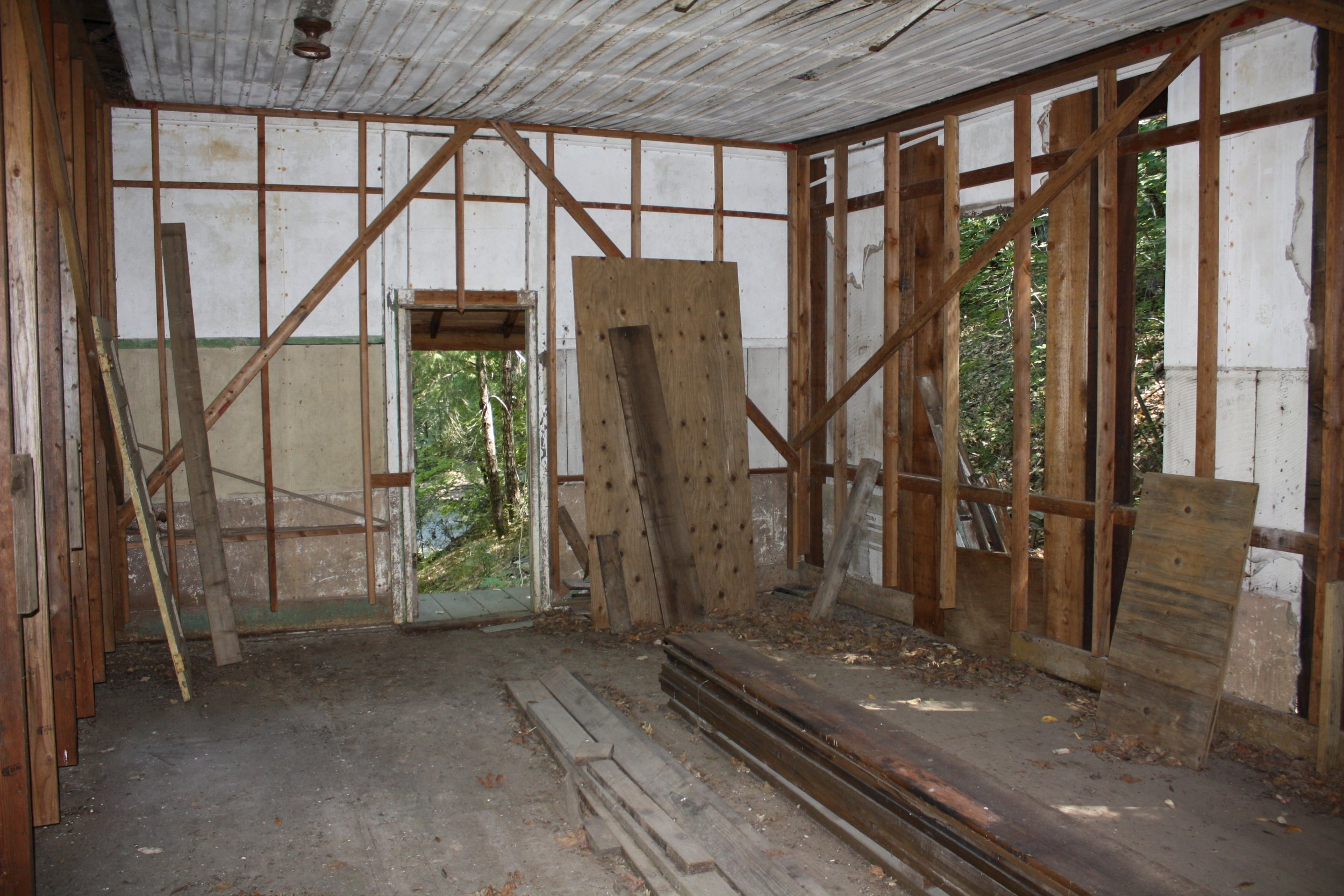
inside front wall

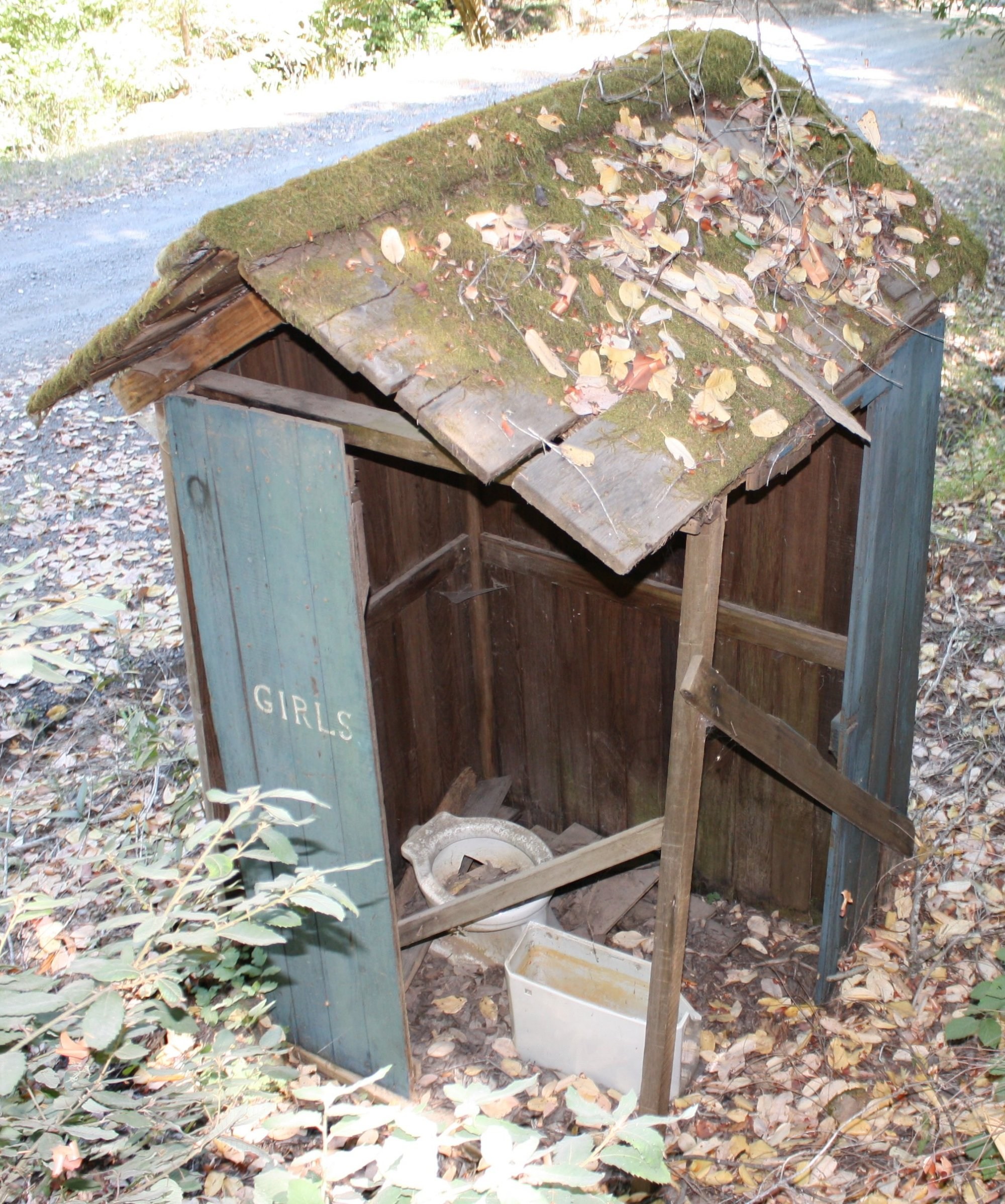
girls outhouse

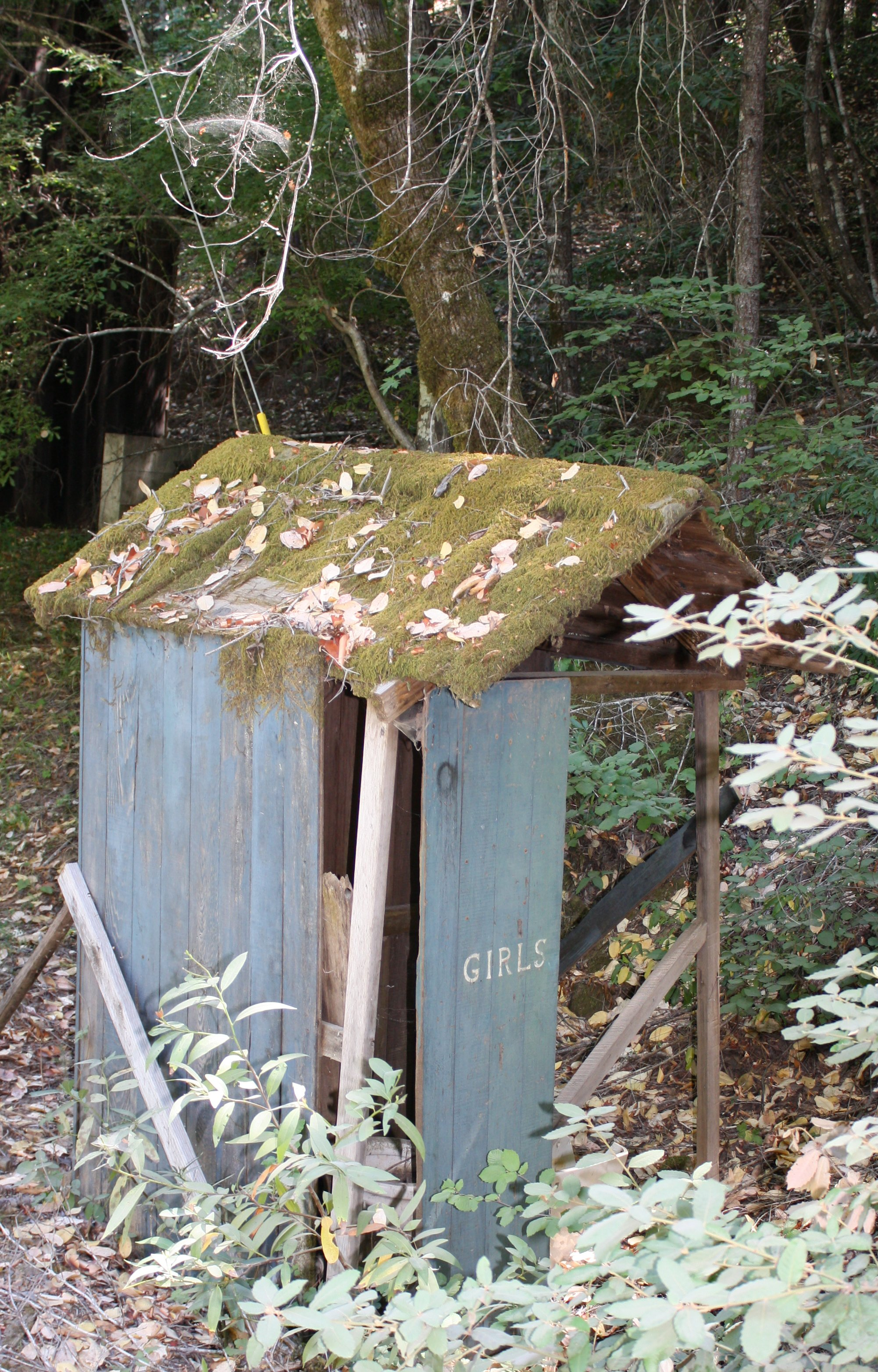
girls outhouse

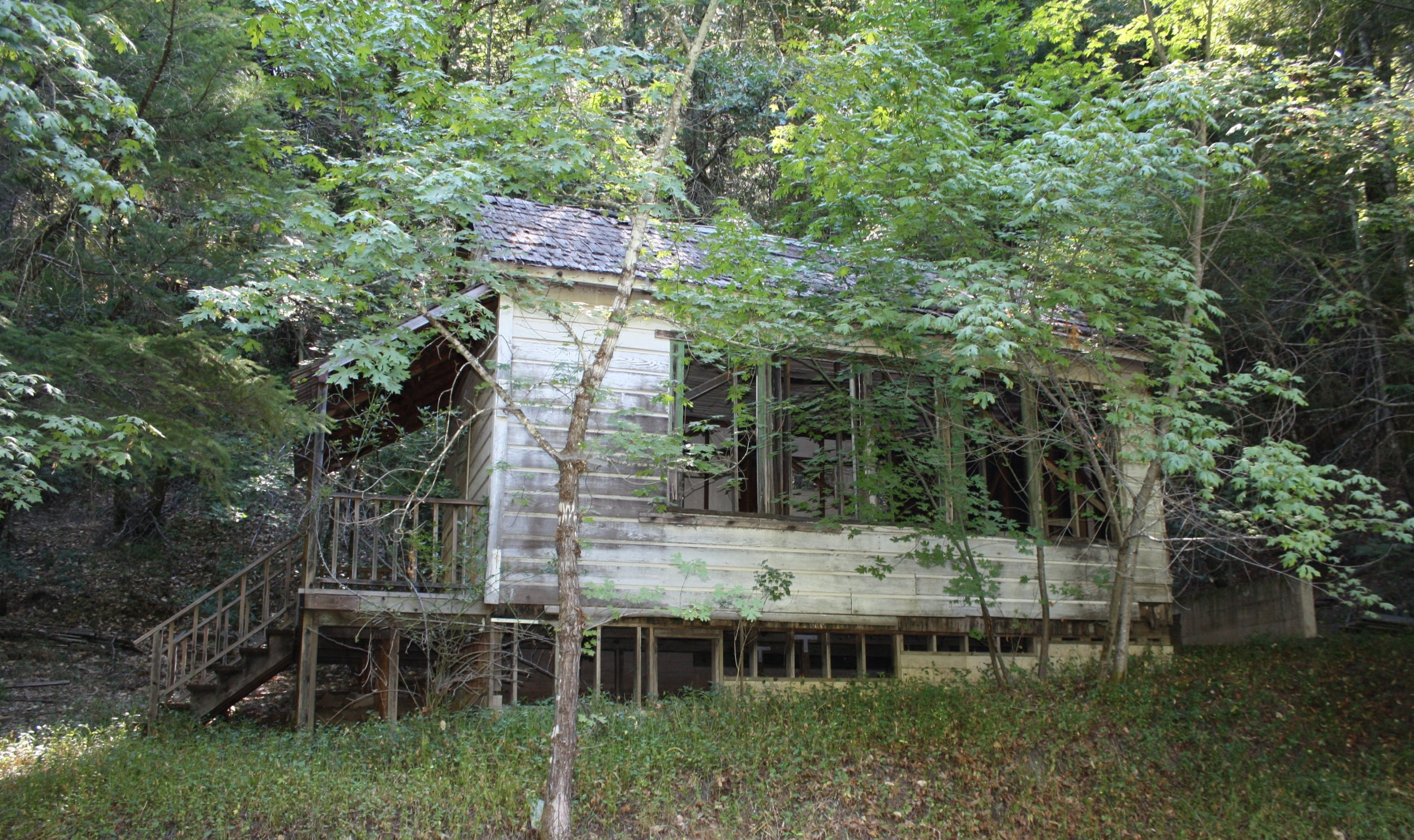
Daniels school

=== Felta School ===
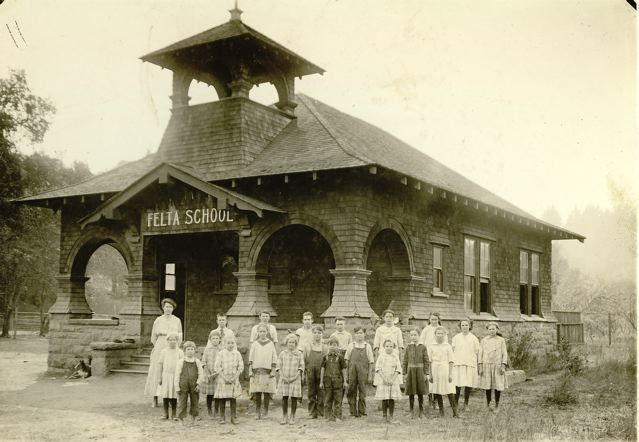
An early photo of the teacher and students of the Felta School, c. 1910.

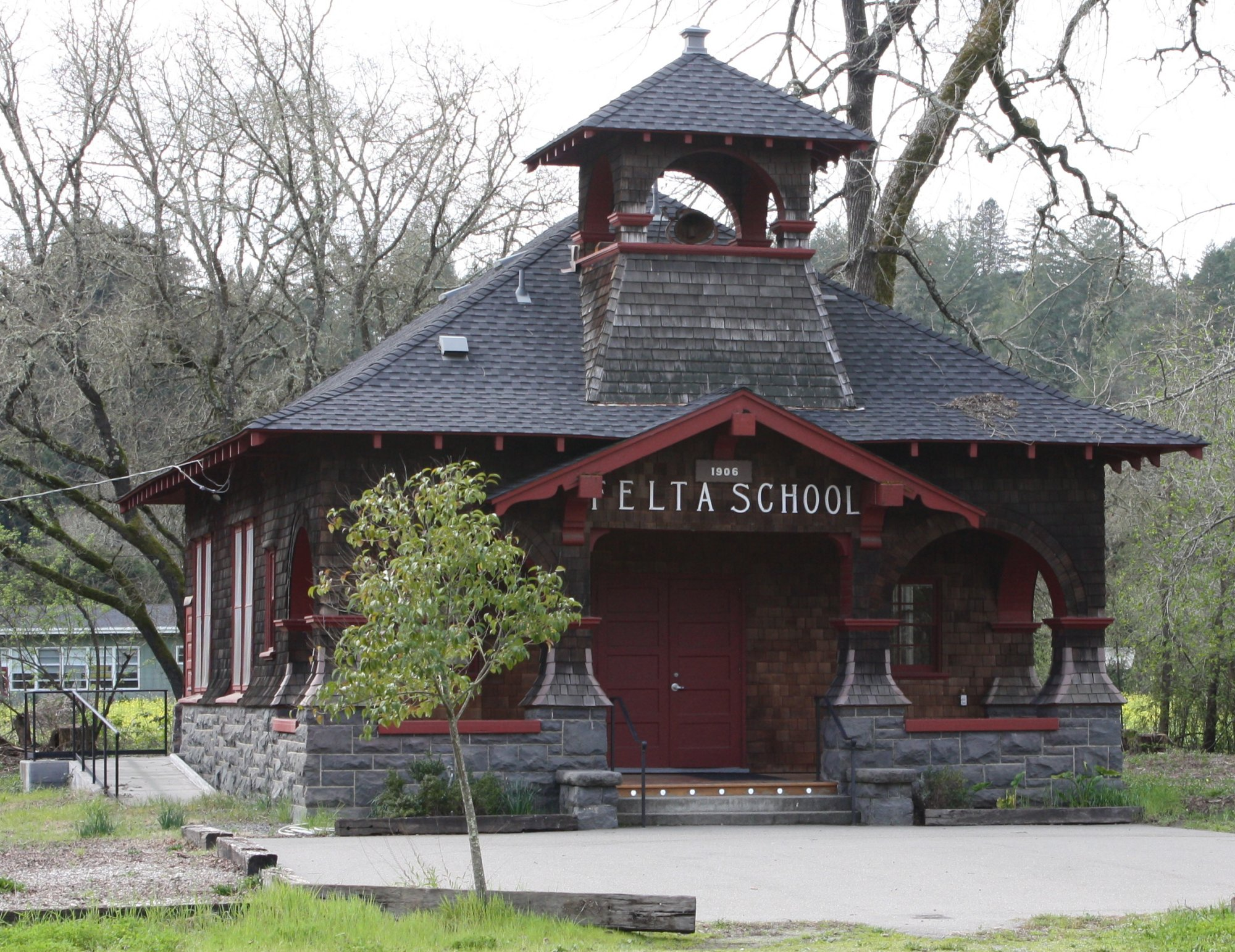
The Felta School in 2011.

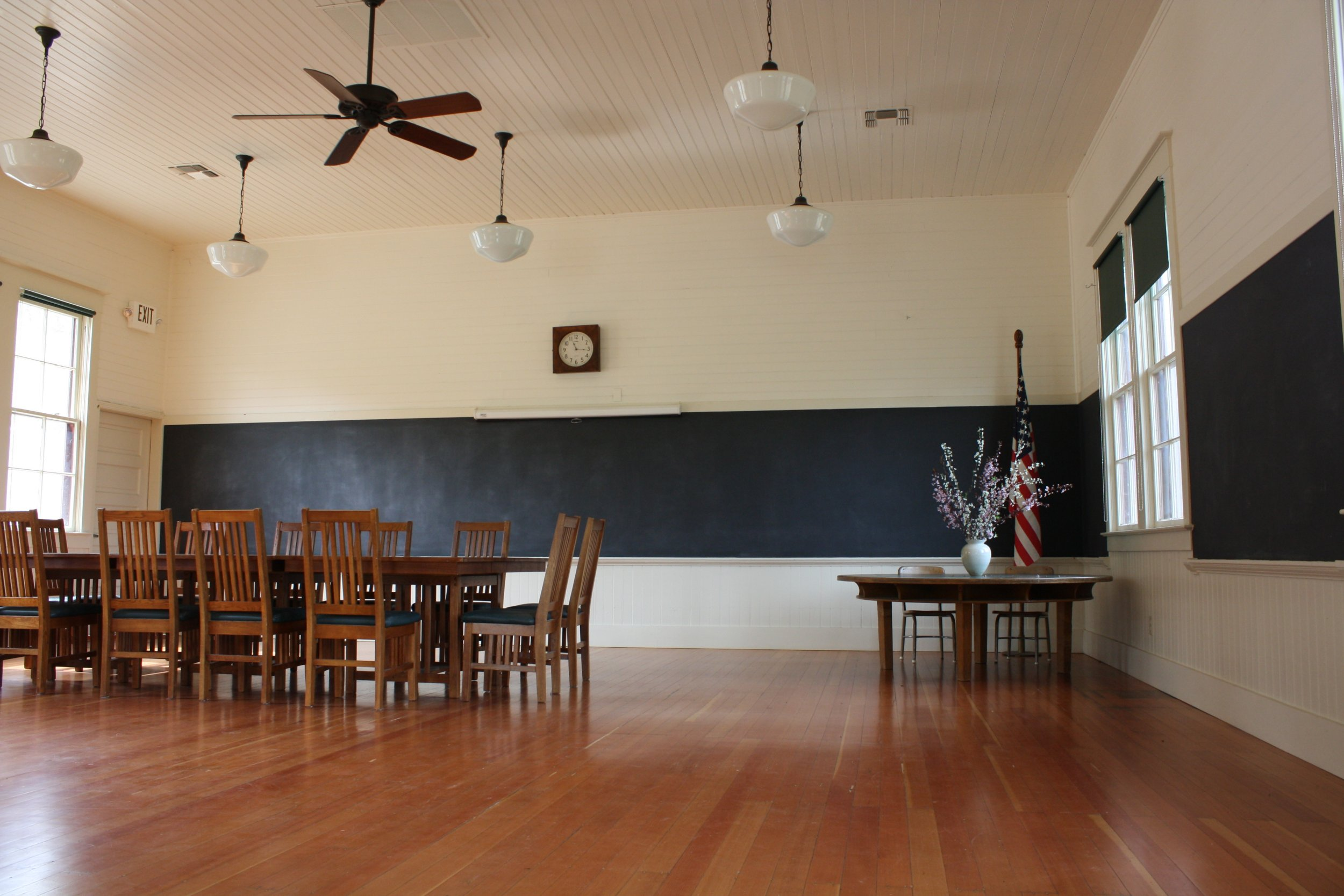
Felta School classroom

== Geography ==
Gray Creek begins at about 1,400 feet on the southeastern slopes of Vulture Ridge(1,481 feet), first flowing southeasterly, it parallels the north side of Mill Creek Road, as it passes Venado less than a mile from its headwaters, drains through a culvert to the south side of the road, then curves around the east and south ridges of Rabbit Knoll, as it changes to a southwesterly course, and flows down a steep-sided V-shaped canyon vegetated mainly by bay trees. Streamside vegetation is abundant with horsetails, azaleas, ferns, wild grapes, oaks and redwoods. Closely paralleling a dirt road along its journey, Gray Creek drains an area of approximately 5.1 square miles, and enters East Austin Creek on the left, just inside the northern boundary of the Austin Creek State Recreation Area, at an elevation of about 340 feet.

Located in the northeastern section of the Austin Creek watershed, Gray Creek is a 4.8 mile long tributary to East Austin Creek, which flows into Austin Creek, the Russian River and Pacific Ocean.

== Rainfall ==
Venado is known for being a particularly rainy location with respect to the San Francisco Bay Area.

== Nearby ==
On November 27, 1951 Felta School closed, along with Daniels and the three other remaining classic one room Sonoma County rural schools, as changing times, including demands for expanded resources and greater efficiency, required a new approach: consolidation.

Felta School, West Side Union School District, is a one-room schoolhouse built in 1906, that has been fully restored, is open to the public, and can be reserved for educational programs.

Located approximately two miles south of Healdsburg, on Felta Road near its junction with Westside Road, only a short distance from what is generally accepted to be the original mill that Mill Creek was named for.

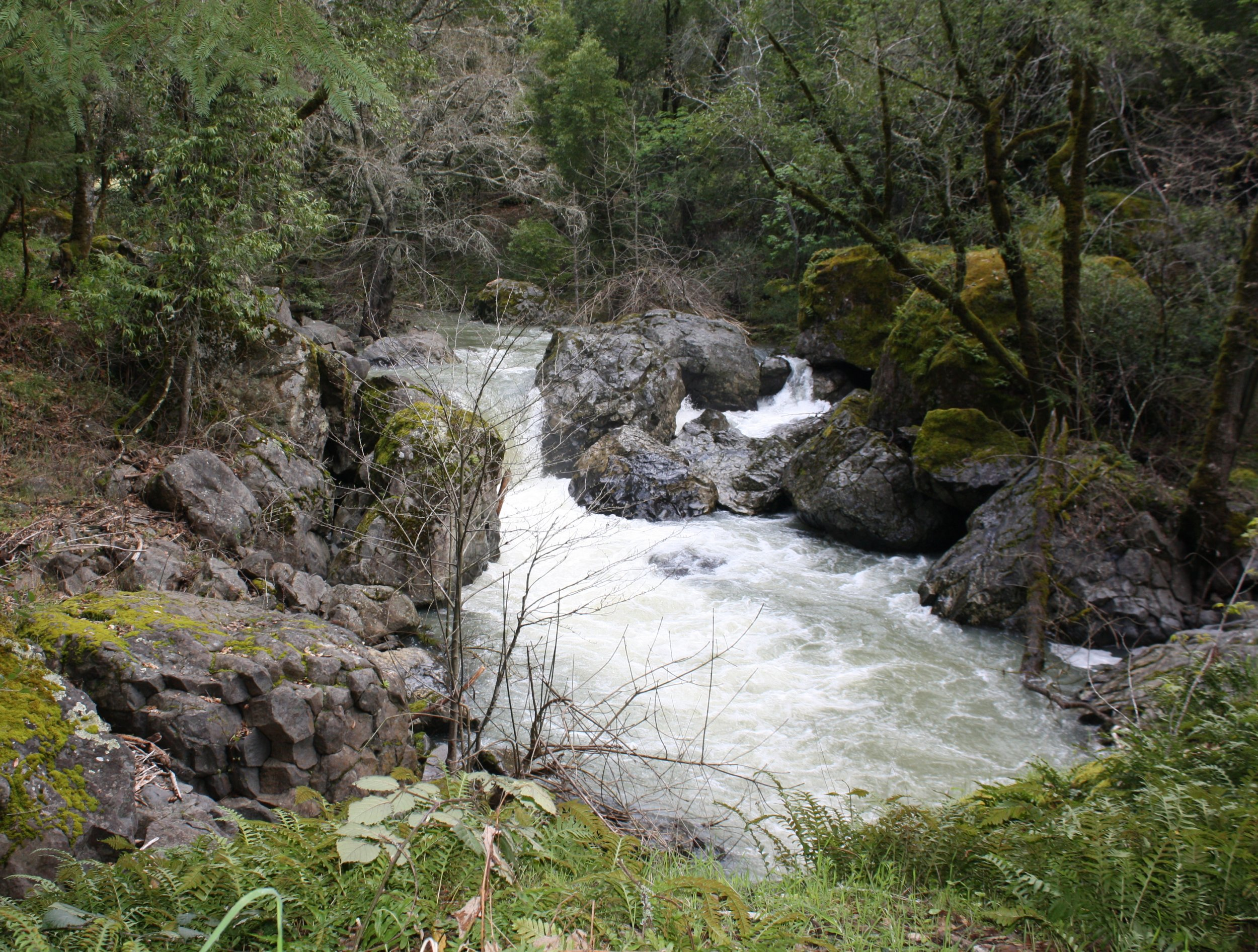
Mill Creek waterfall

March's Mill, one of the earliest sawmills in Sonoma County, California, gave Mill Creek its name in the 1850s, after William J. March and Samuel Heald founded their sawmill and lumber mill along Mill Creek, near its confluence with Felta Creek, in September 1850.

Mill Creek begins at about 1,400 feet on the northeastern slopes of Vulture Ridge, first flowing around the ridge's eastern spur, it proceeds down steep U-shaped Pickle Canyon in a southeasterly direction, before paralleling Mill Creek Road, passing Daniels School, and adding four major tributaries, draining a basin of approximately 24 square miles. Tan oak, alder, bay and redwoods forest the drainage area, and the federally protected northern spotted owl is listed by the California Department of Fish and Game as occurring in the Mill Creek watershed.

Located in the southwestern section of the Dry Creek watershed, Mill Creek is a tributary to Dry Creek and flows southeasterly for about 12 miles, entering Dry Creek on the right, near its confluence with the Russian River, at an elevation of about 60 feet.

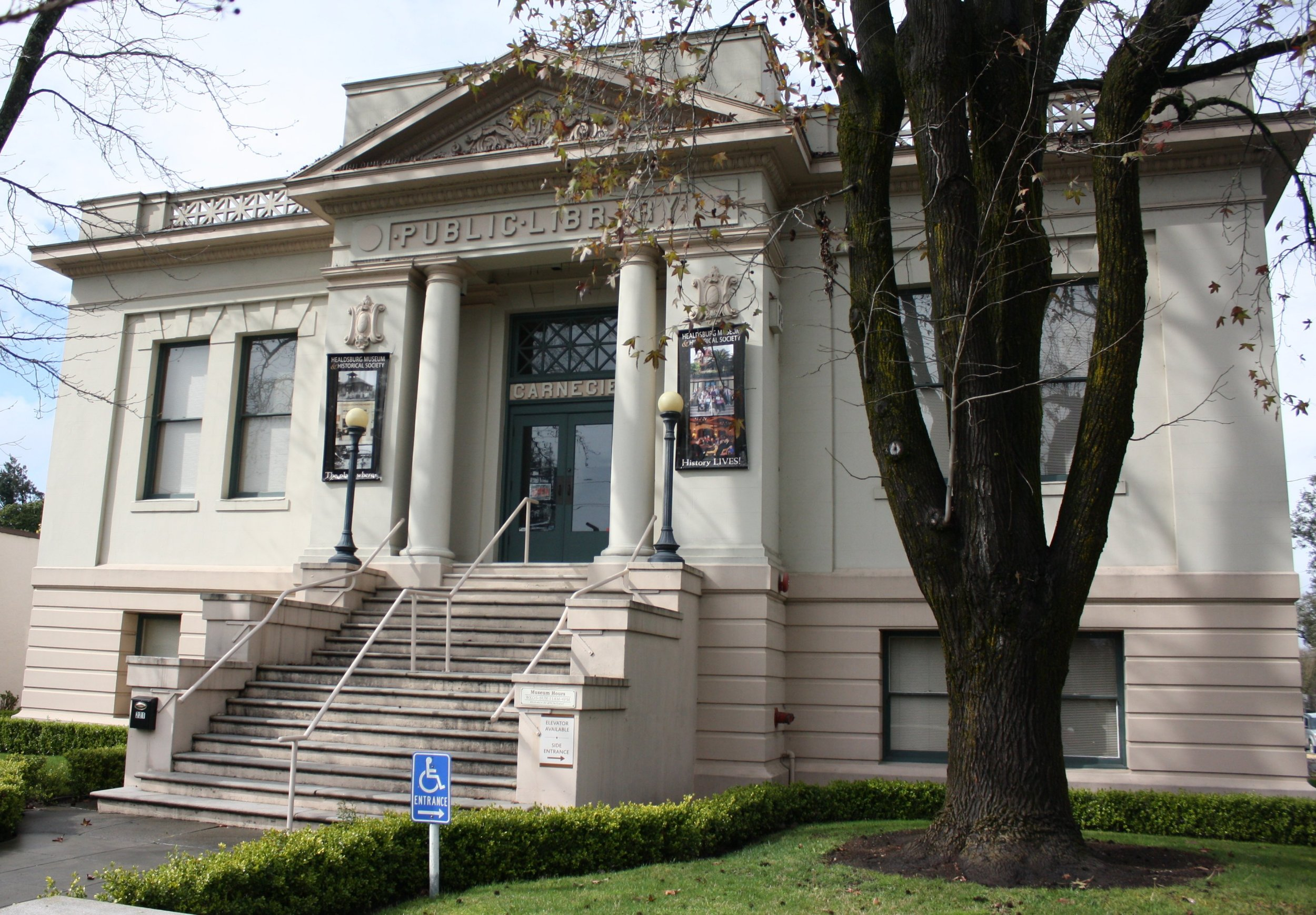
Healdsburg Museum
