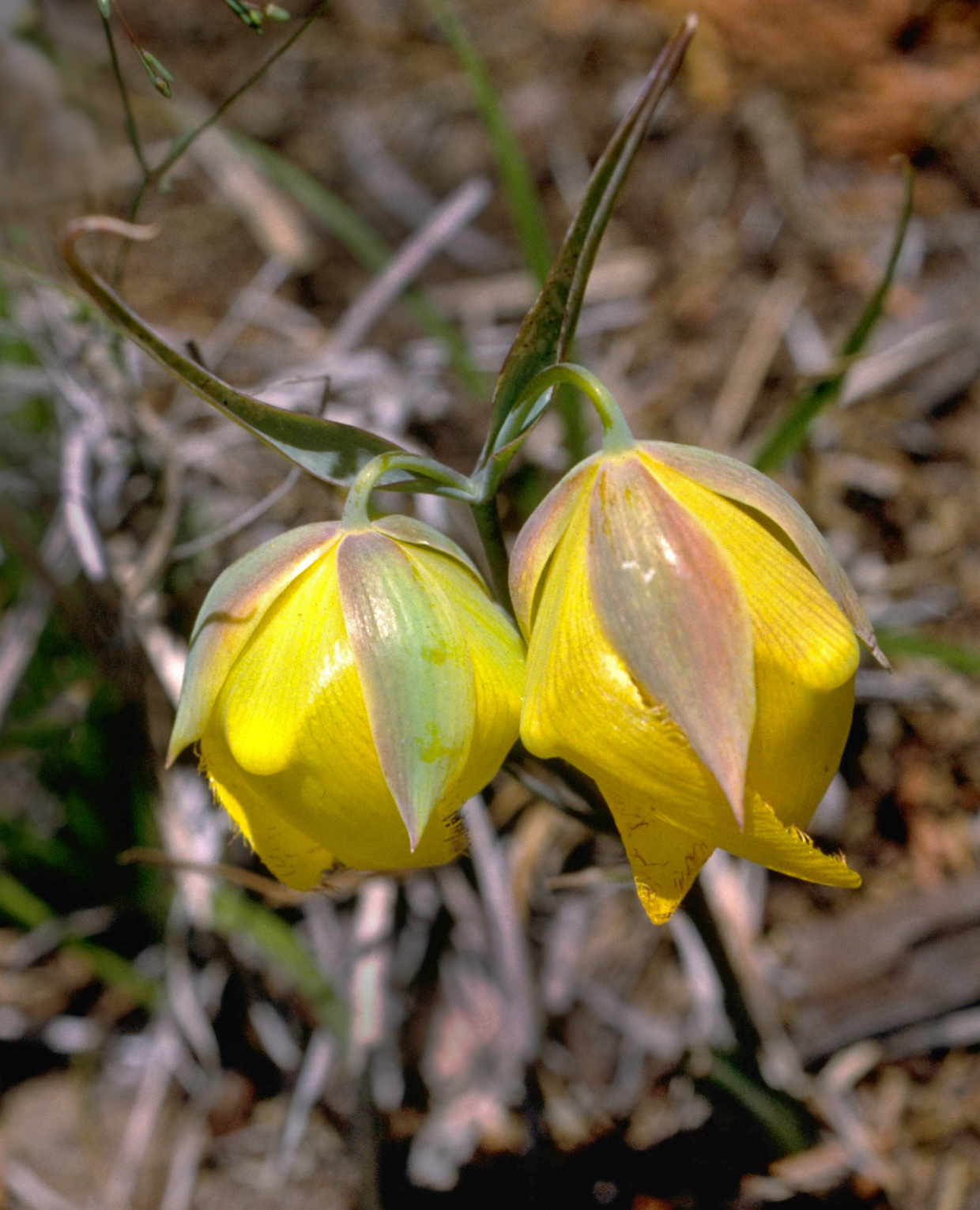

Conservation status
- Imperiled (NatureServe)

Scientific classification
- Kingdom: Plantae
- Clade: Embryophytes
- Clade: Tracheophytes
- Clade: Spermatophytes
- Clade: Angiosperms
- Clade: Monocots
- Order: Liliales
- Family: Liliaceae
- Genus: Calochortus
- Species: C. raichei

Binomial name
- Calochortus raichei Farwig & Girard

= Calochortus raichei =

Species of flowering plant

Calochortus raichei is a rare species of flowering plant in the lily family known by the common name Cedars' fairy-lantern. It is endemic to Sonoma County, California, where it is known only from The Cedars, an unincorporated area outside Guerneville north of Cazadero, just west of Austin Creek State Recreation Area.

The species is named for botanist Roger Raiche, who collected it in flower in 1982 and it was published by Farwig & Girard as a distinct new species in 1987.

== Distribution ==
It is limited to the ultramafic rock (serpentine soil) at the headwaters of Big Austin and East Austin Creeks which are part of the Russian River watershed. In the East Austin headwaters, it is not only in The Cedars, but extends SE in a contiguous band of ultramafic rock that crosses parts of Murray, Devil, Thompson, Morrison and Gilliam Creeks where it occurs on the flanking slopes. It also occurs in Grasshopper, Danfield, Cedar and House Creeks, which are part of the Wheatfield Fork of the Gualala River watershed.

== Description ==
Calochortus raichei is a perennial herb from a membranous coated bulb, producing a stem which is typically 2 - 5 dm tall, but can reach 1 meter tall in some years. The gray basal leaf is up to 40 centimeters long, typically withered at flowering; there may be smaller leaves higher up the stem. The herbage of the plant is generally very waxy in texture.

The inflorescence typically bears only one or two nodding flowers as the side branches usually do not develop, but in favored sites the side branches may produce additional flowers (3 - 12), spherical in shape with their petal tips touching. The three sepals are about 2 centimeters long and dull tan to greenish, and the three petals about 4 centimeters in length and yellow,. Both sepals and petals age to orange-bronze. The petals are coated inside and fringed with hairs. The fruit is an angled capsule around 3 -5 centimeters long containing dark brown seeds.
