= Milo Samuel Baker =

American Botanist

- Born: July 19, 1868; Strawberry Point, Iowa
- Died: January 4, 1961 (aged 92); Sonoma, California
- Scientific career
- Fields: Botany
- Author abbrev. (botany): M.S.Baker

Milo Samuel Baker (July 19, 1868 – January 4, 1961) was an American botanist, specializing in plants of the northern coastal region of California, as well as the genus Viola.

In 1875 Milo Samuel Baker moved with his family to Tehama County, California. After graduating from secondary school in San Jose, he became a school teacher in Santa Clara County and Modoc County. He studied from 1891 to 1892 at Stanford University. He graduated from the University of California, Berkeley with a bachelor's degree in chemistry in 1895. He taught from 1901 to 1906 at San Francisco's Lowell High School. After working as a farmer and rancher in Kenwood, he was a professor of botany from 1922 to 1945 at Santa Rosa Junior College (SRJC). He established the North Coast Herbarium at SRJC and in 1933 donated his private collection to the Herbarium. In retirement, he continued to tend the Herbarium and at SRJC continued to teach the introductory field botany course until he was over 90. Baker Hall at SRJC is named in his honor. The herbarium that Baker established is now housed at Sonoma State University.

He was a co-collector with Jens Clausen, Franklin P. Nutting (1876–1957), and Harrison Smith. Baker sent many botanical specimens to Edward Lee Greene. Baker did pioneering research on the flora of eastern Shasta, Modoc, and Lassen counties. He was president of the California Botanical Society in 1952.

He married Jennie Churchill on 14 July 1897.

== Eponyms ==
- Arctostaphylos bakeri Eastw.
- Blennosperma bakeri Heiser
- Cryptantha milobakeri I.M.Johnst.
- Cupressus bakeri Jeps.
- Delphinium bakeri Ewan
- Viola bakeri Greene
