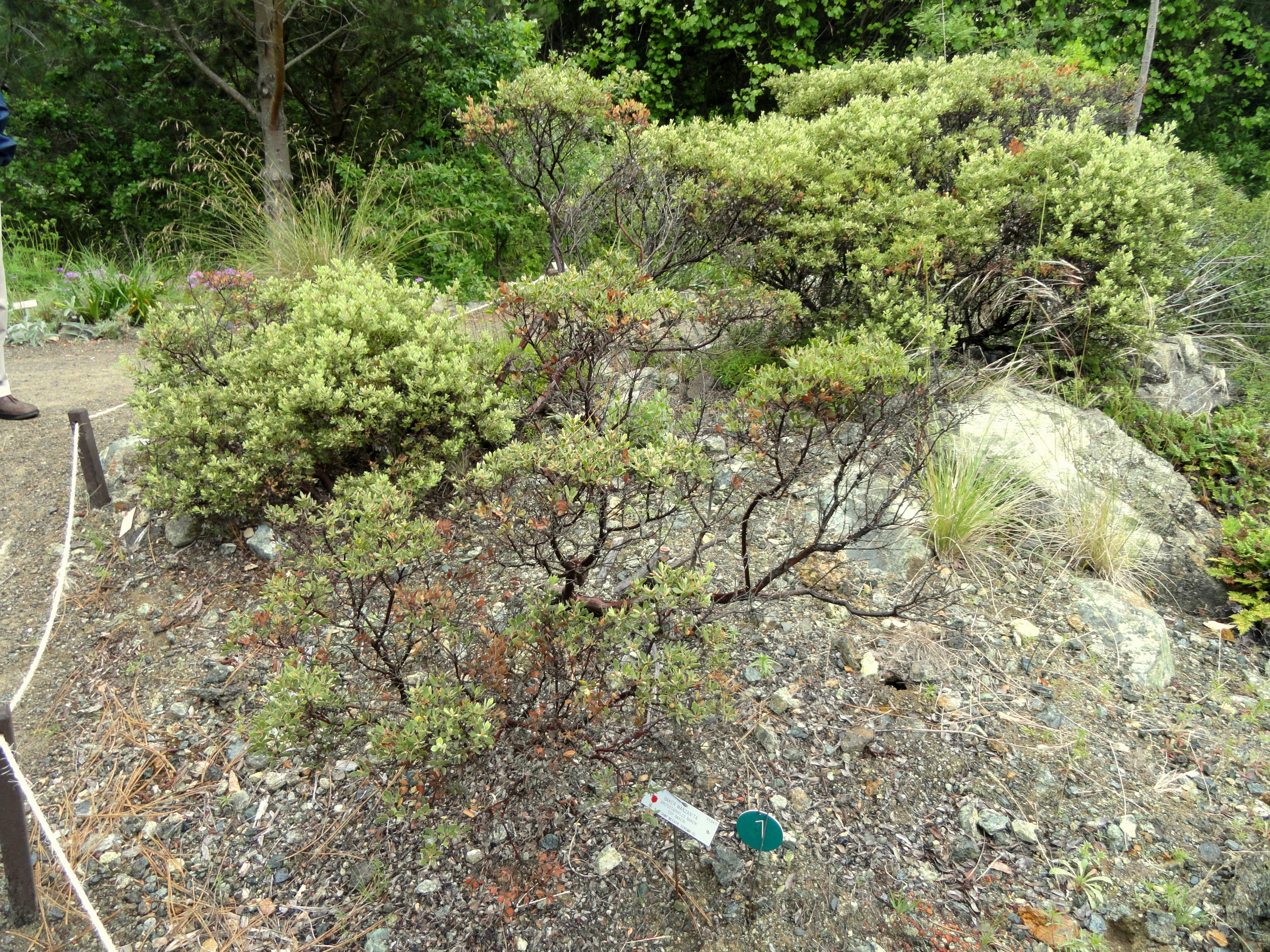

Conservation status
- Imperiled (NatureServe)

Scientific classification
- Kingdom: Plantae
- Clade: Embryophytes
- Clade: Tracheophytes
- Clade: Spermatophytes
- Clade: Angiosperms
- Clade: Eudicots
- Clade: Asterids
- Order: Ericales
- Family: Ericaceae
- Genus: Arctostaphylos
- Species: A. bakeri

Binomial name
- Arctostaphylos bakeri Eastw.

Subspecies
- Arctostaphylos bakeri subsp. bakeri; Arctostaphylos bakeri subsp. sublaevis P.V.Wells

Synonyms
- Arctostaphylos manzanita subsp. bakeri (Eastw.) P.V.Wells; Arctostaphylos pungens subsp. bakeri (Eastw.) Roof; Arctostaphylos stanfordiana subsp. bakeri (Eastw.) J.E.Adams

= Arctostaphylos bakeri =

Species of flowering plant

Arctostaphylos bakeri is a species of manzanita known by the common name Baker's manzanita. It is endemic to Sonoma County, California, where it grows in the chaparral and woodlands of the North Coast Ranges. It is sometimes a member of the serpentine soils flora.

== Description ==
Arctostaphylos bakeri is a shrub growing one to three meters in height. Its smaller twigs are bristly and glandular or hairy to woolly. The dark green leaves are generally oval in shape and up to 3 centimeters long. They may be glandular, rough or fuzzy in texture, and dull or shiny in appearance.

The plentiful inflorescences hold crowded clusters of urn-shaped manzanita flowers. The fruit is a hairless drupe up to a centimeter wide.

== Subspecies ==
Two subspecies are accepted:

- Arctostaphylos bakeri subsp. bakeri
- Arctostaphylos bakeri subsp. sublaevis P.V.Wells – endemic to The Cedars in Sonoma County, California

== See also ==
- California chaparral and woodlands
- Milo Samuel Baker
