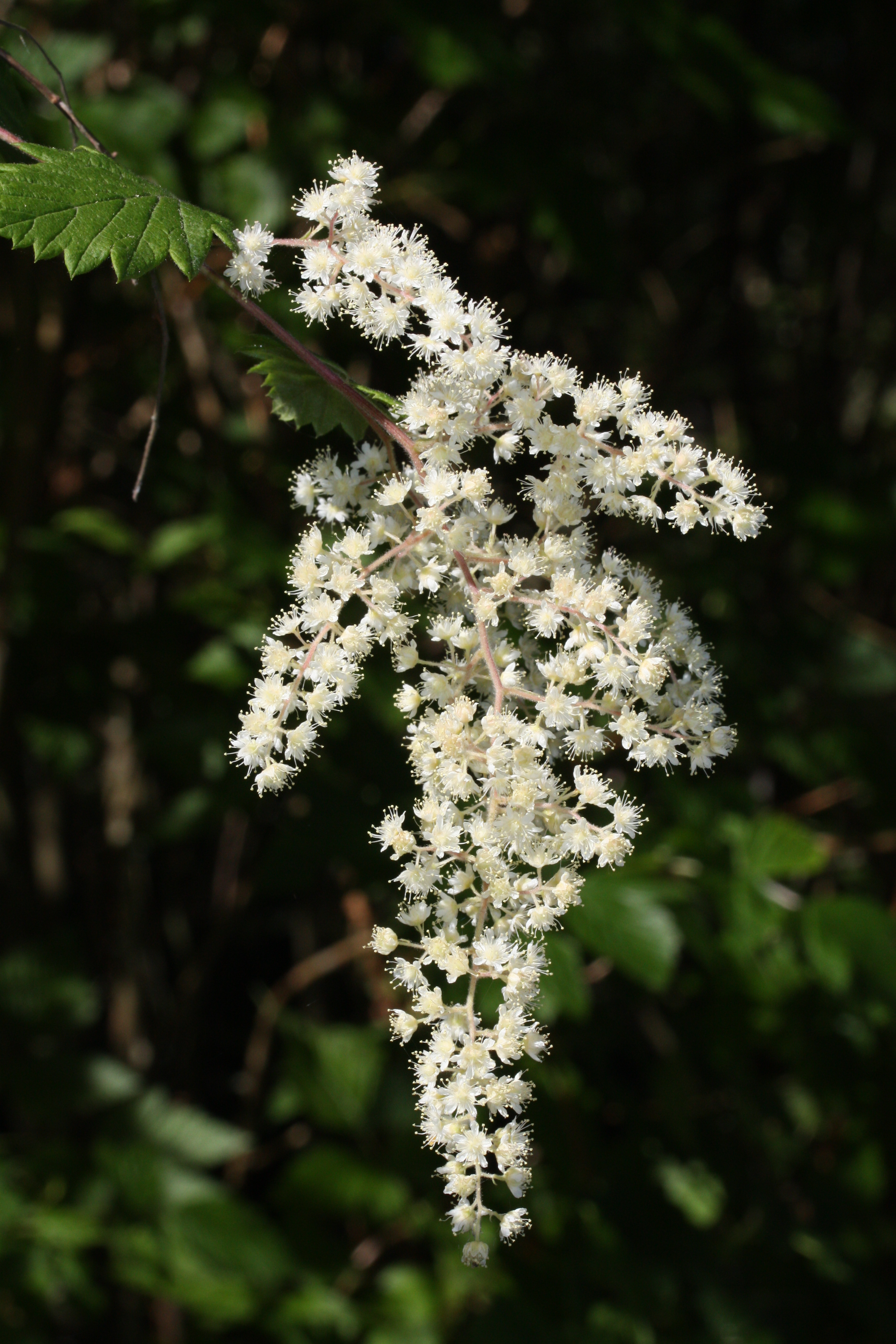
- Flowers in Anacortes, Washington

Conservation status
- Secure (NatureServe)

Scientific classification
- Kingdom: Plantae
- Clade: Embryophytes
- Clade: Tracheophytes
- Clade: Spermatophytes
- Clade: Angiosperms
- Clade: Eudicots
- Clade: Rosids
- Order: Rosales
- Family: Rosaceae
- Genus: Holodiscus
- Species: H. discolor

Binomial name
- Holodiscus discolor (Pursh) Maxim.

Varieties
- Holodiscus discolor var. cedrorum (Raiche & Reveal) D.Potter & Raiche; Holodiscus discolor var. discolor; Holodiscus discolor var. glabrescens (Greenm.) Jeps.; Holodiscus discolor var. microphyllus (Rydb.) Jeps.

Synonyms
- Synonymy: Holodiscus dumosus A.Heller, nom. superfl.; Schizonotus argenteus var. discolor (Pursh) Kuntze; Schizonotus discolor (Pursh) Koehne; Sericotheca discolor (Pursh) Rydb.; Spiraea var. discolor (Pursh) Torr. & A.Gray; Spiraea discolor Pursh; Spiraea discolor var. dumosa S.Watson, not validly publ.; Spiraea dumosa Nutt. ex Hook. synonyms of var. cedrorum: Holodiscus dumosus var. cedrorus Raiche & Reveal synonyms of var. discolor: Holodiscus ariifolius (Sm.) Greene; Holodiscus boursieri (Carrière) Rehder; Holodiscus discolor var. ariifolius (Sm.) Jeps.; Holodiscus discolor proles ariifolius (Sm.) Asch. & Graebn.; Holodiscus discolor var. delnortensis F.A.Ley; Holodiscus discolor proles eudiscolor Asch. & Graebn., not validly publ.; Holodiscus discolor subsp. franciscanus (Rydb.) R.L.Taylor & MacBryde; Holodiscus discolor var. franciscanus (Rydb.) Jeps.; Holodiscus discolor var. typicus F.A.Ley; Holodiscus dumosus subsp. saxicola (A.Heller) Abrams; Holodiscus dumosus var. typicus F.A.Ley; Holodiscus franciscanus (Rydb.) Rehder; Holodiscus microphyllus var. sericeus F.A.Ley; Holodiscus microphyllus var. typicus F.A.Ley; Holodiscus saxicola A.Heller; Schizonotus argenteus var. ariifolius (Sm.) Kuntze; Schizonotus ariifolius (Sm.) Greene; Schizonotus discolor Raf.; Schizonotus discolor var. ariifolius (Sm.) Koehne; Schizonotus discolor var. purshianus Rehder; Sericotheca boursieri (Carrière) Rydb.; Sericotheca concolor Rydb.; Sericotheca franciscana Rydb.; Sericotheca obovata Rydb.; Sericotheca saxicola (A.Heller) Rydb.; Spiraea ariifolia Sm.; Spiraea ariifolia f. carnea H.L.Späth; Spiraea boursieri Carrière; Spiraea discolor Torr., nom. illeg. homonym. post.; Spiraea discolor var. ariifolia (Sm.) S.Watson synonyms of var. glabrescens: Holodiscus dumosus var. glabrescens (Greenm.) C.L.Hitchc.; Holodiscus glabrescens (Greenm.) A.Heller; Holodiscus microphyllus var. glabrescens (Greenm.) F.A.Ley; Sericotheca glabrescens (Greenm.) Rydb.; Spiraea discolor var. glabrescens Greenm. synonyms of var. microphyllus: Holodiscus discolor subsp. microphyllus (Rydb.) A.E.Murray; Holodiscus microphyllus Rydb.; Sericotheca microphylla (Rydb.) Rydb.

= Holodiscus discolor =

Species of flowering plant

Holodiscus discolor, commonly known as ocean spray or oceanspray, creambush, ironwood, mountain spray, and rock-spiraea, is a shrub of western North America.

== Description ==
Holodiscus discolor is a fast-growing deciduous shrub usually from to 1.2–1.5 metres (4–5 feet) in width, and up to 2.1 m (7 ft) tall. Its alternate leaves are small, 5–9 centimetres (2–3 1/2 inches) long and 4–7 cm (1 1/2–3 in) broad, lobed, juicy green when new. The young branches have longitudinal ridges.

Cascading clusters of white flowers drooping from the branches give the plant its two common names. The flowers have a faint sweet, sugary scent. The bloom period is May to July.

It bears a small, hairy fruit containing one seed which is light enough to be dispersed by wind.

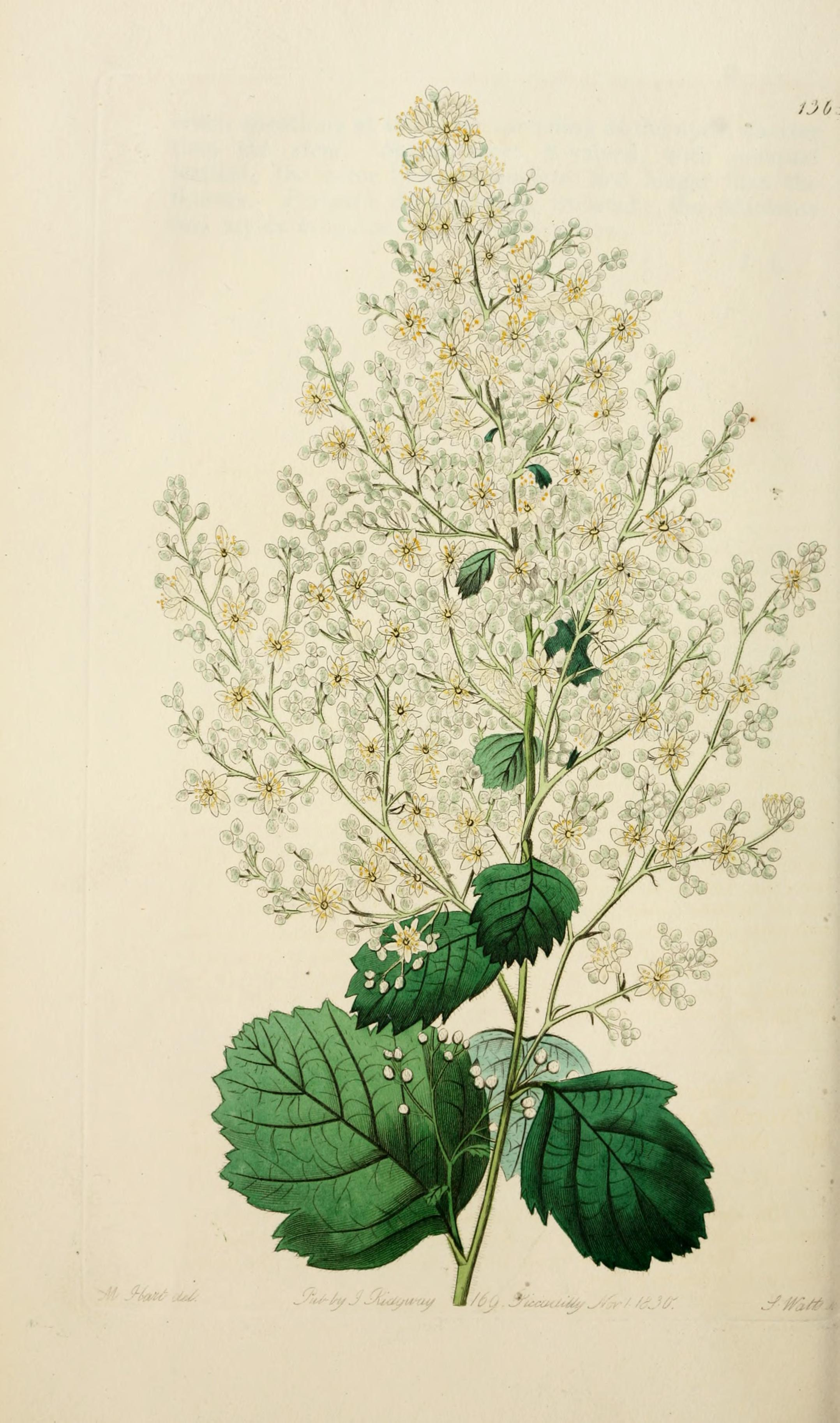
Illustration

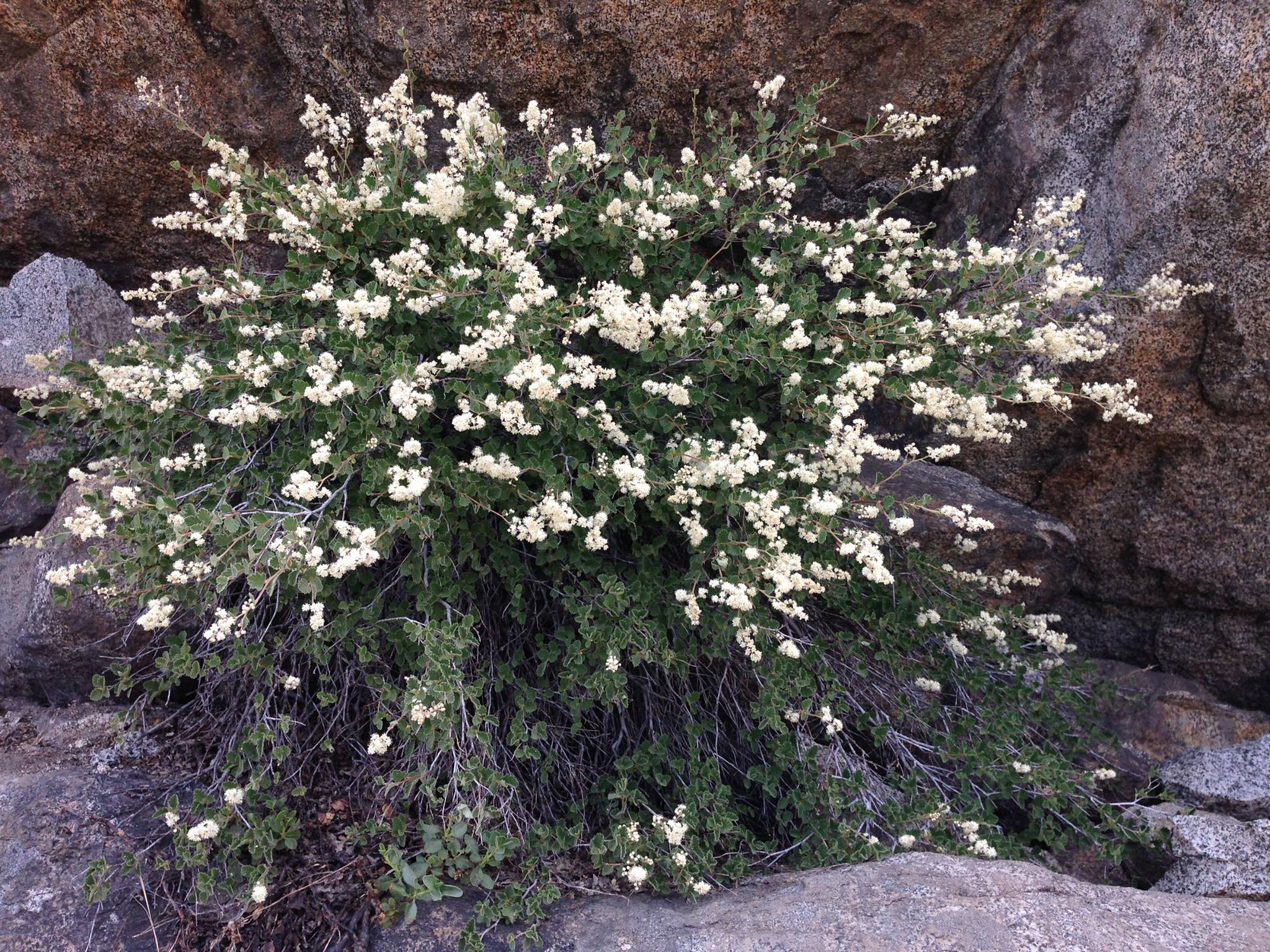
Specimen in Tahoe National Forest, California

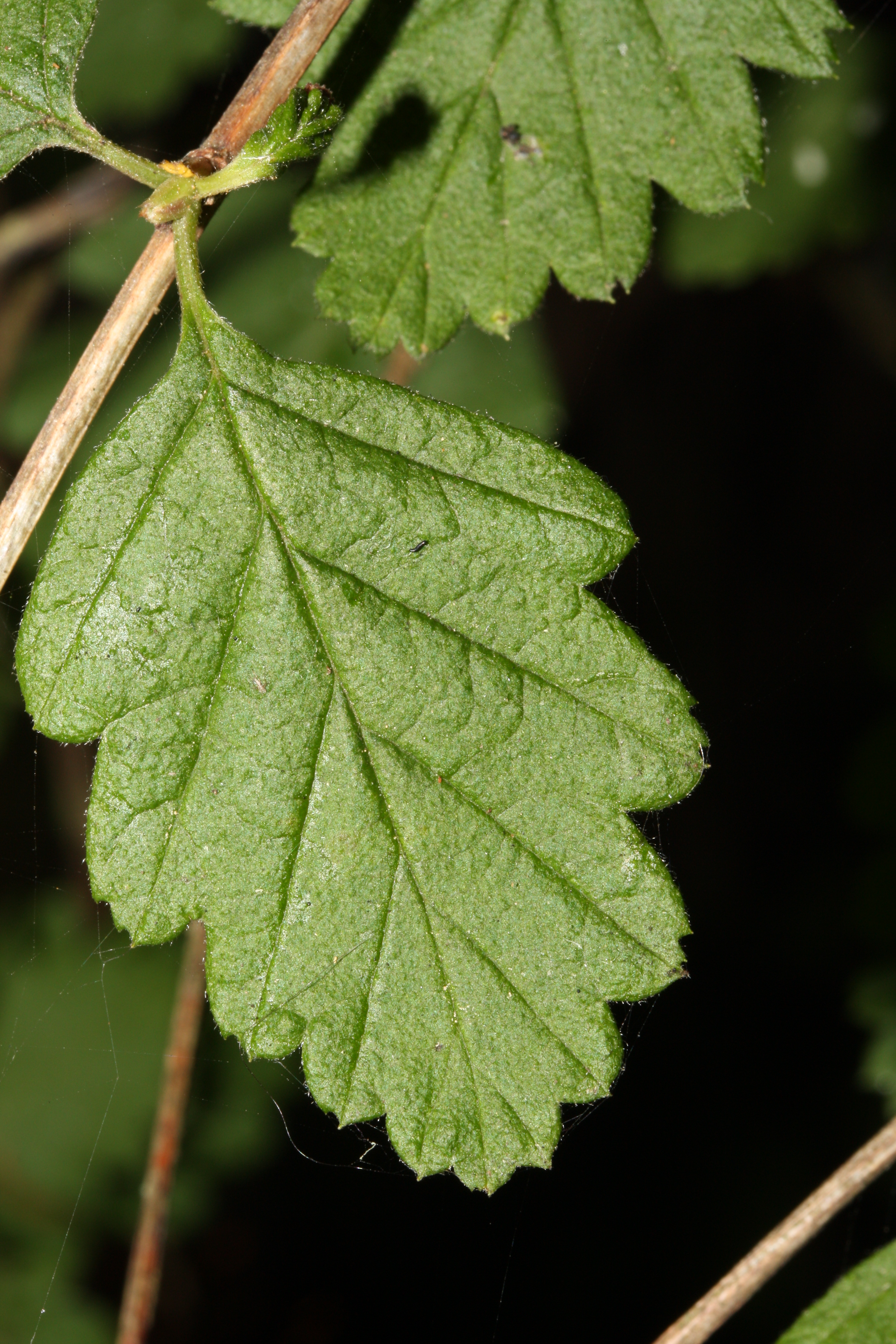
Leaves

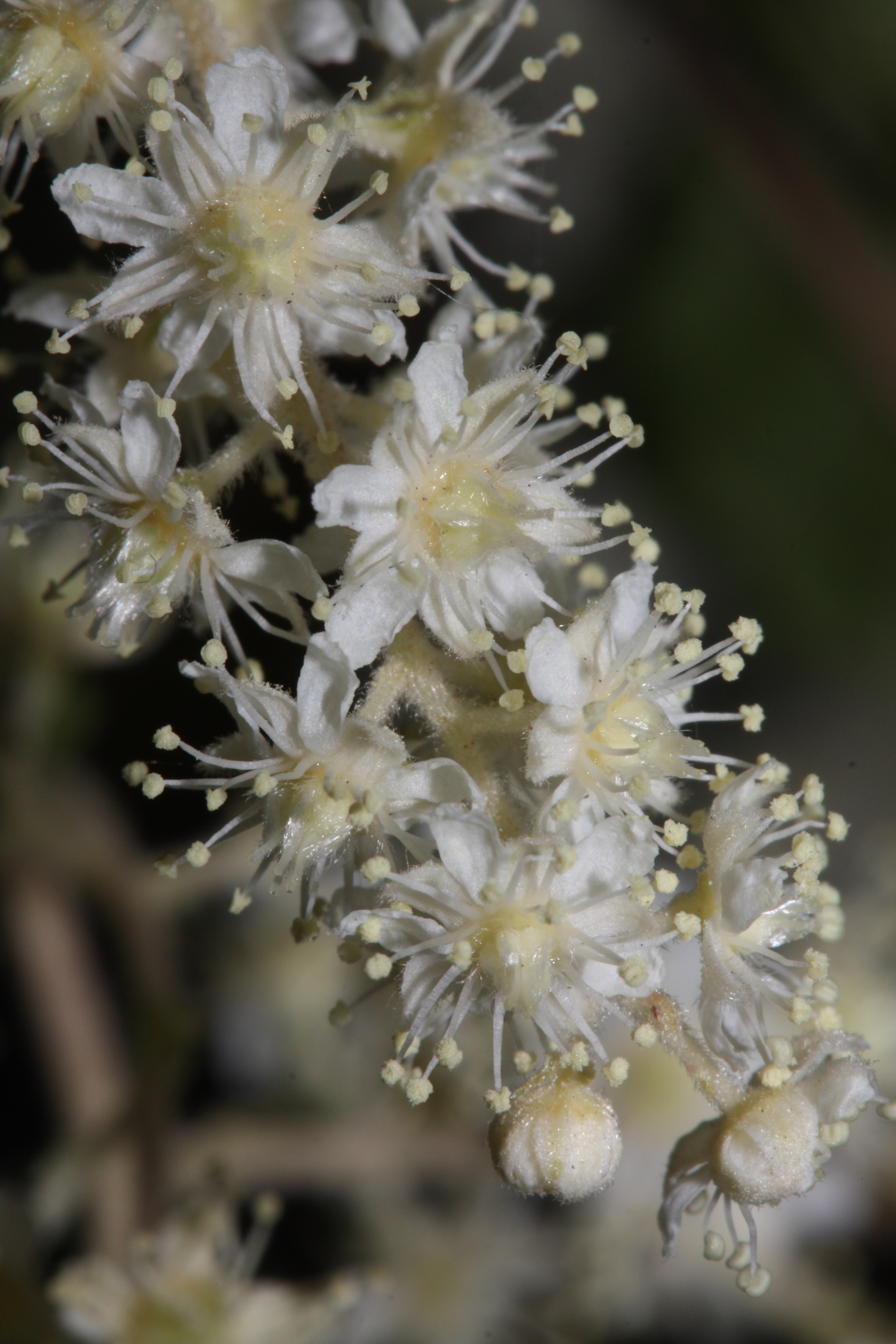
Close-up of flowers

== Distribution and habitat ==
The plant is common in the Pacific Northwest, and throughout California in diverse habitats including California mixed evergreen forest, California oak woodlands, chaparral, Coast redwood forest, Douglas-fir forest, Yellow pine forest, Red fir forest, and Lodgepole pine forest. It is native to regions of California including the High Sierra Nevada, Northern and Southern California Coast Ranges, Klamath Mountains, Santa Cruz Mountains, Western Transverse Ranges, and the San Gabriel Mountains.

It also grows in the Rocky Mountains of Colorado, New Mexico, Wyoming, and Idaho. It has been called "nearly ubiquitous" in many plant communities in Utah. In Arizona it occurs in the mountain wilderness of the Madrean Sky Islands such as the Chiricahua Mountains, sometimes in scree with Douglas-fir, and is a common plant in the Grand Canyon. In Nevada it is a component of quaking aspen and willow communities and sagebrush of the Great Basin region.

It is found in both openings and the common understory shrub in a variety of forest overstories from 300–1,300 m (980–4,270 ft) in elevation. In open mountain habitat in the Sierra Nevadas it can be found as high as 3,500 m (11,500 ft). It is found in a variety of habitats, from moist coastal forests to drier, cooler mountains of inland California. The plant is found in areas prone to wildfire, and it is often the first green shoot to spring up in an area recovering from a burn. It is commonly found in chaparral communities, a fire ecology ecosystem which evolved with burning periodically. It also may grow in areas cleared by logging.

In the California black oak woodland plant community, common understory associate species include Toxicodendron diversilobum (Western poison-oak), Heteromeles arbutifolia (toyon), and Dryopteris arguta (coastal wood fern).

== Varieties ==
Four varieties are accepted.

- Holodiscus discolor var. cedrorum (Raiche & Reveal) D.Potter & Raiche — endemic to serpentine soils in The Cedars area of Sonoma County, California.
- Holodiscus discolor var. discolor – British Columbia, western and south-central United States, and northern, central, and southwestern Mexico
- Holodiscus discolor var. glabrescens (Greenm.) Jeps. – northern California
- Holodiscus discolor var. microphyllus (Rydb.) Jeps. – western United States and Baja California Norte

== Ecology ==
It is of special value as a pollinator plant for native bees and butterflies. It is also a larval host to Lorquin's admiral, pale tiger swallowtail, and spring azure caterpillars.

== Uses ==
Historically, the plant has been used by Indigenous peoples for many purposes. Raw and cooked seeds were eaten, and leaves were mixed with those of other plants and boiled with small game animals. Many tribes used the wood and bark for making tools and furniture. Noted for the strength of its wood, it was often used for making digging sticks, spears, arrows, bows, harpoons and nails. The wood, like with many other plants, was often hardened with fire and was then polished using horsetail.

The K'ómoks and Tla'amin use oceanspray flowering as an indicator of the best time to dig for butter clams and that the sockeye salmon run is about to begin.

Early immigrant explorers used the wood to make nails.

=== Medicinal ===
The Lummi used the flowers as an antidiarrheal and the leaves as a poultice. Several First Nations, such as the Stl'atl'imx, would steep the berries in boiling water to use as a treatment for diarrhea, smallpox, chickenpox and as a blood tonic. Native American peoples such as the Paiute and Shoshoni utilized this as a traditional medicinal plant for ailments such as stomachaches and colds.
