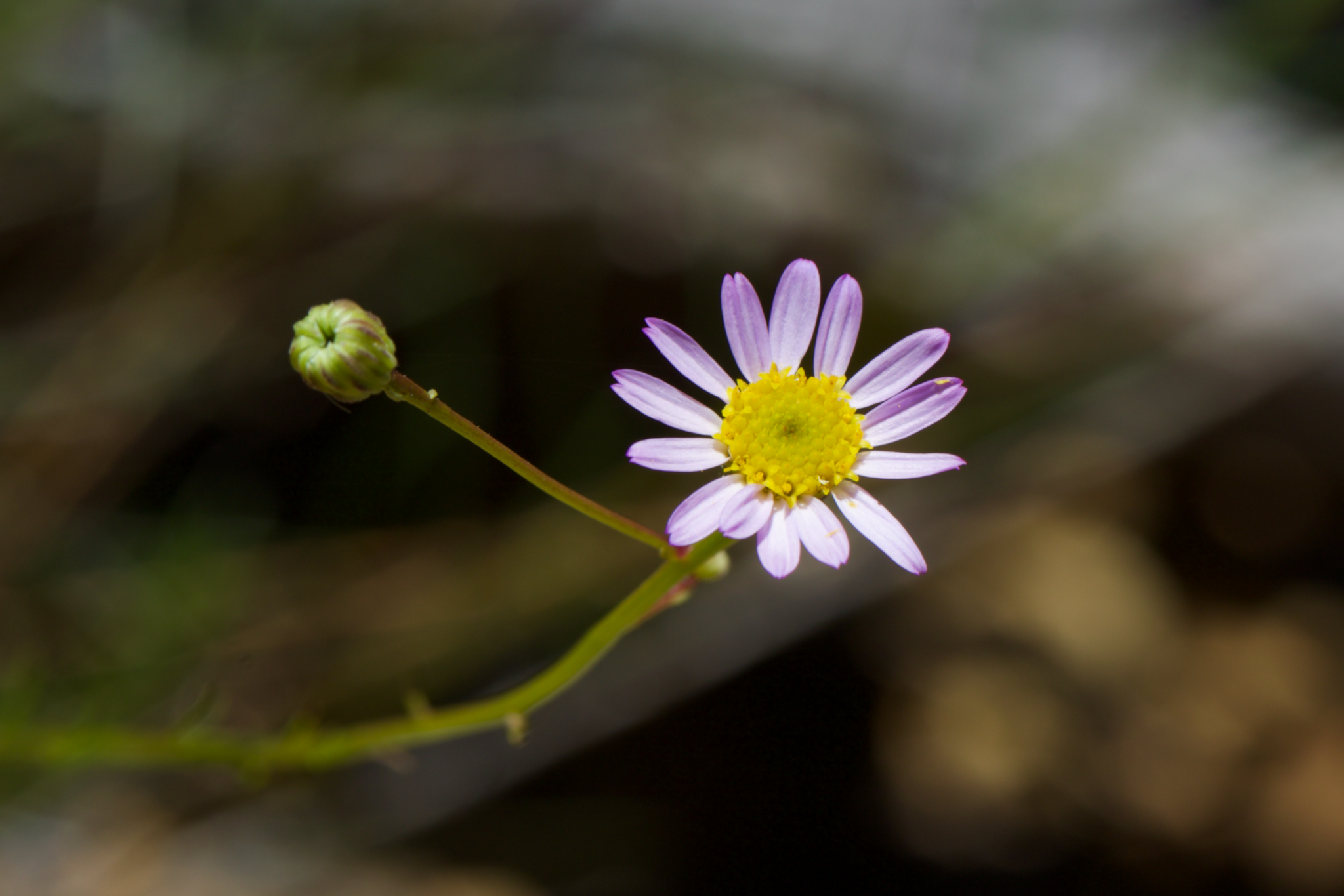

Conservation status
- Imperiled (NatureServe)

Scientific classification
- Kingdom: Plantae
- Clade: Tracheophytes
- Clade: Angiosperms
- Clade: Eudicots
- Clade: Asterids
- Order: Asterales
- Family: Asteraceae
- Genus: Erigeron
- Species: E. serpentinus

Binomial name
- Erigeron serpentinus G.L.Nesom

= Erigeron serpentinus =

Species of flowering plant

Erigeron serpentinus is a rare species of flowering plant in the family Asteraceae known by the common names serpentine fleabane and serpentine daisy. It is endemic to Sonoma County, California, where it is known from three occurrences in and around The Cedars, in the Coast Ranges east of Salt Point and west of Healdsburg. There are an estimated 1100 individuals in existence. The Cedars is a canyon habitat with serpentine soils surrounded by non-serpentine terrain; it is home to several rare serpentine-endemic plant species. This daisy was discovered there and described to science in 1992.

Erigeron serpentinus is a perennial herb producing an upright stem up to 50 centimeters (20 inches) long from a taproot and caudex unit. The linear leaves are up to 4 centimeters (1.6 inches) long and under a millimeter wide. The inflorescence is a solitary flower head or a cluster of 2–4 heads. Each has 9–13 white ray florets 7 or 8 millimeters in length which turn blue as they dry. These surround numerous yellow disc florets.
