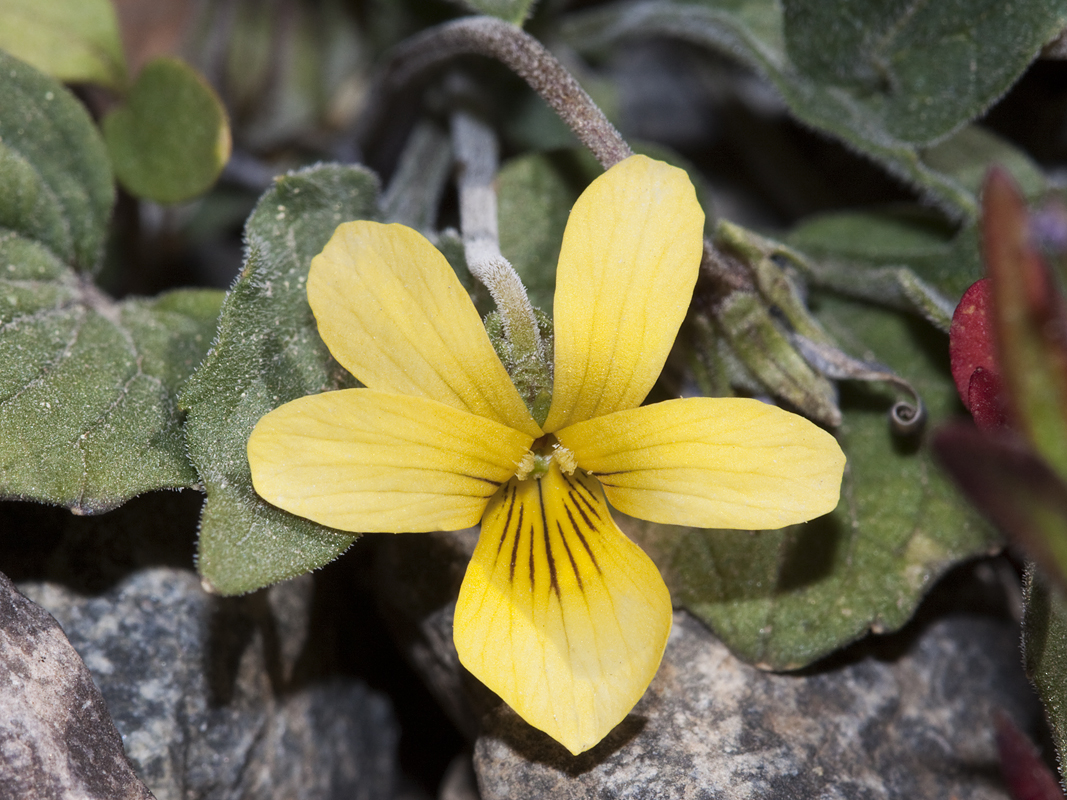
- Baker's violet

Conservation status
- Apparently Secure (NatureServe)

Scientific classification
- Kingdom: Plantae
- Clade: Tracheophytes
- Clade: Angiosperms
- Clade: Eudicots
- Clade: Rosids
- Order: Malpighiales
- Family: Violaceae
- Genus: Viola
- Species: V. bakeri

Binomial name
- Viola bakeri Greene

= Viola bakeri =

Species of flowering plant

Viola bakeri is a species of violet known by the common name Baker's violet. It is native to the Western United States, from Washington and Oregon, to the mountains of northern Nevada, and in California to the southern High Sierra Nevada.

The plant occurs in openings in coniferous forest habitats.

== Description ==
Viola bakeri is an herb that grows from a woody taproot, reaching a maximum height of a few centimeters to around 30 centimetres (12 in). The leaves have lance-shaped blades up to 5 or 6 centimeters long which are borne on petioles. They are usually hairless, but may have hairs along the veins and edges.

A solitary flower is borne on an upright stem. It has five yellow petals, the lowest three marked with brown veining, and the upper pair sometimes tinged with brown or purple on the outer surface.

== See also ==
- Milo Samuel Baker
