= Austin Creek State Recreation Area =

Recreational area in California

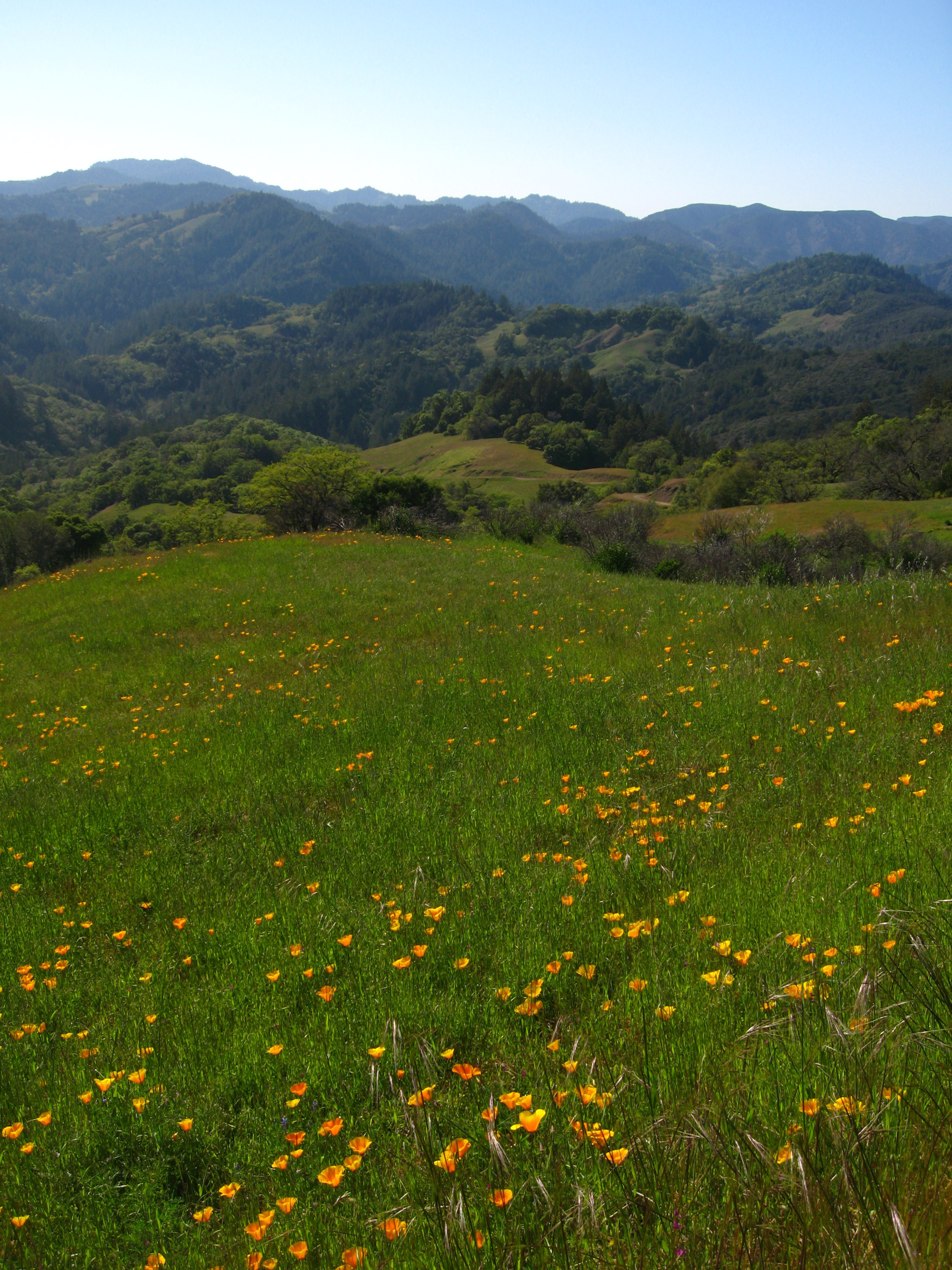
- Austin Creek State Recreation Area
- Interactive map of Austin Creek State Recreation Area
- Location: Sonoma County, California, United States
- Nearest city: Guerneville, California
- Coordinates: 38°34′1″N 123°3′11″W
- Area: 5,927 acres (23.99 km^{2})
- Established: 1964
- Governing body: California Department of Parks and Recreation

Austin Creek State Recreation Area is a state park unit of California, United States, encompassing an isolated wilderness area. It is located in Sonoma County, California, adjacent to Armstrong Redwoods State Natural Reserve, with which it shares a common entrance. Its rugged topography includes ravines, grassy hillsides, oak-capped knolls, and rocky summits offering glimpses of the Pacific Ocean. There are 20 miles (30 km) of trails, panoramic wilderness views, and camping (both back-country and vehicle-accessible). The remains of Pond Farm artists' colony (dating from the 1940s) are also included in the Austin Creek SRA.

== Ecology ==
Elevations in Austin Creek SRA range from 150 to 1,500 feet (46 to 457 m), giving rise to a variety of habitats, including riparian area, chaparral, and woodlands of conifers and oaks. The area's 5,927 acres (2,399 ha) include open woodlands, rolling hills, and meadows which contrast sharply with dense redwood forests below.

Wildflowers of the area include Douglas irises, Indian paintbrushes, buttercups, lupins, cluster-lilies, California poppies and shooting stars. Trout, salmon, newts and salamanders inhabit the area's streams, and Bullfrog Pond hosts sunfish, black bass, and bullfrogs. Birds such as wild turkeys, wood ducks, spotted owls, great blue herons, ravens, white-tailed kites, California quail, woodpeckers, hawks, and tyrant-flycatchers are seen there. Native mammals include squirrels, deer, raccoons, foxes, coyotes, skunks, bobcats, black bears, and mountain lions. Feral pigs have also been reported.

== History ==
Austin Creek State Recreation Area was one of 48 state parks threatened with closure in 2008 by Governor Arnold Schwarzenegger It was one of 70 California state parks proposed for closure in July 2012 as part of a deficit reduction program.

In September 2012, California State Parks gave Stewards of the Coast and Redwoods, a non-profit, permission to run the recreation area.

== See also ==
- Austin Creek
- List of California state parks
