= Austin Creek =

Stream in Sonoma County, California

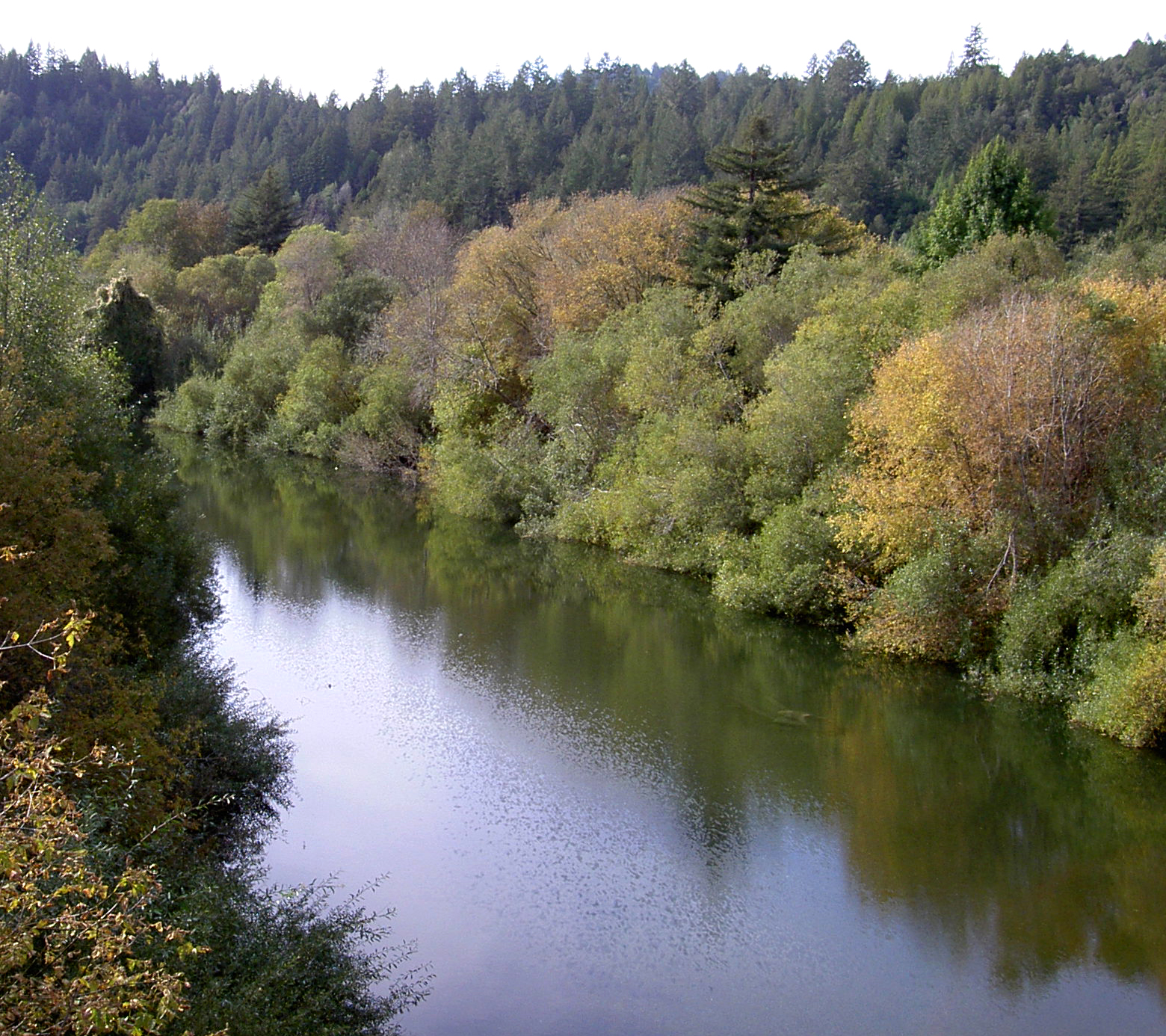
- Austin Creek in November 2009

- Location of the mouth of Austin Creek in California

Location
- Country: United States
- State: California
- Region: Sonoma County
- City: Cazadero, California

Physical characteristics
- Source: The Cedars (Sonoma County, California)
  - location: 13 mi (20 km) west of Healdsburg, California
  - coordinates: 38°37′50″N 123°7′48″W
  - elevation: 1,965 ft (599 m)
- Mouth: Russian River
  - location: 1 mi (2 km) north of Duncans Mills, California
  - coordinates: 38°28′0″N 123°3′0″W
  - elevation: 23 ft (7.0 m)

Basin features
- Tributaries
  - left: East Austin Creek
  - right: Bearpen Creek, Kidd Creek

Austin Creek is a 16.0-mile-long (25.7 km) southward-flowing stream in the mountains of western Sonoma County, California which empties into the Russian River about 4 miles (6 km) from the Pacific Ocean.

== Course ==
The creek originates in an isolated area known as The Cedars, about 13 miles (21 km) west of Healdsburg, California. It flows south past Layton Mine into a wooded canyon, where it joins King Ridge Road just above its confluence with Bearpen Creek. It parallels King Ridge Road to the town of Cazadero and continues south through confluences with East Austin Creek and Kidd Creek. It flows under State Route 116 at milepost 4.93 and enters the Russian River about 1 mile (1.6 km) north of the town of Duncans Mills.

== History ==
In the 1885–1886, the North Pacific Coast Railroad (NWP) extended its narrow-gauge line up Austin Creek to transport lumber from Cazadero to points south. The railroad grade was later converted to road, becoming Cazadero Highway.

=== Sonoma Magnesite Company ===
The Cedars is a distinctive woodland of trees able to grow on a formation of Mesozoic intrusive ultramafic rock. Sonoma Magnesite Company was formed in 1912 to mine the Red Slide Deposit of magnesite in The Cedars. The mineral is important for steel-making and manufacture of bricks for high-temperature applications; but cost of transportation made mining in The Cedars infeasible until World War I interrupted availability of less expensive sources. The Sonoma Magnesite Tramway, an eleven-mile-long, 2 ft (610 mm) narrow gauge industrial railway was built in 1914 along the bank of East Austin Creek to connect the mine with Magnesia station on the NWP railroad south of Cazadero. Thirty tons of ore were calcined daily in an oil-fired rotary kiln and packed into sacks for shipping. Production ended in 1920 when magnesite again became available from less expensive sources.

=== Sonoma Magnesite Tramway ===
The railway shipped sacks of magnesite on 4-wheel flatcars. Each of the ten flatcars was four feet wide by seven feet long and could be loaded with 5 tons of magnesite. Oil for the kiln was shipped in six 500-gallon tank cars eight feet long. Trains were pulled by an unusual variety of locomotives:

Name	Builder	Type	Notes
The Hippo	Joshua Hendy Iron Works of Sunnyvale, California	0-4-0	purchased new; powered by an internal combustion gasoline engine
Betsy	Davenport Locomotive Works	0-4-0ST	steam locomotive purchased used from Washington
		highway truck with flanged wheels on the powered rear axle and a 4-wheel bogie supporting the front end	

High water in East Austin Creek washed out significant portions of the tramway in 1921; and Betsy was washed downstream and partially buried in the gravel channel. Most of the rails had been salvaged by 1925; and the kiln was scrapped in 1937. About 1,000 feet (300 m) of track was left in place for children's amusement on the Baldwin estate near Austin Creek and the old road to Cazadero. That track was destroyed by the Christmas Week flood of 1955, and Betsy was converted to scrap metal in 1961.

== Habitat and pollution ==
As of 2000, Austin Creek and all its major tributaries all supported steelhead trout. Austin Creek and East Austin Creek also harbored California freshwater shrimp.

In 2016, scientists found evidence of methane-producing microbes in water coming from underground at The Cedars, the first time methanogens that thrive in harsh environments have been discovered beyond the ocean floor.

== Bridges ==
Many bridges span Austin Creek. The longest of these is the State Route 116 bridge, which is 380 feet (120 m) long and was built in 1962.

== See also ==
- Armstrong Redwoods State Reserve
- Austin Creek State Recreation Area
- List of watercourses in the San Francisco Bay Area
