= Cazadero, California =

Unincorporated community in California, United States

Cazadero Ingram's Station
- census-designated place & unincorporated community
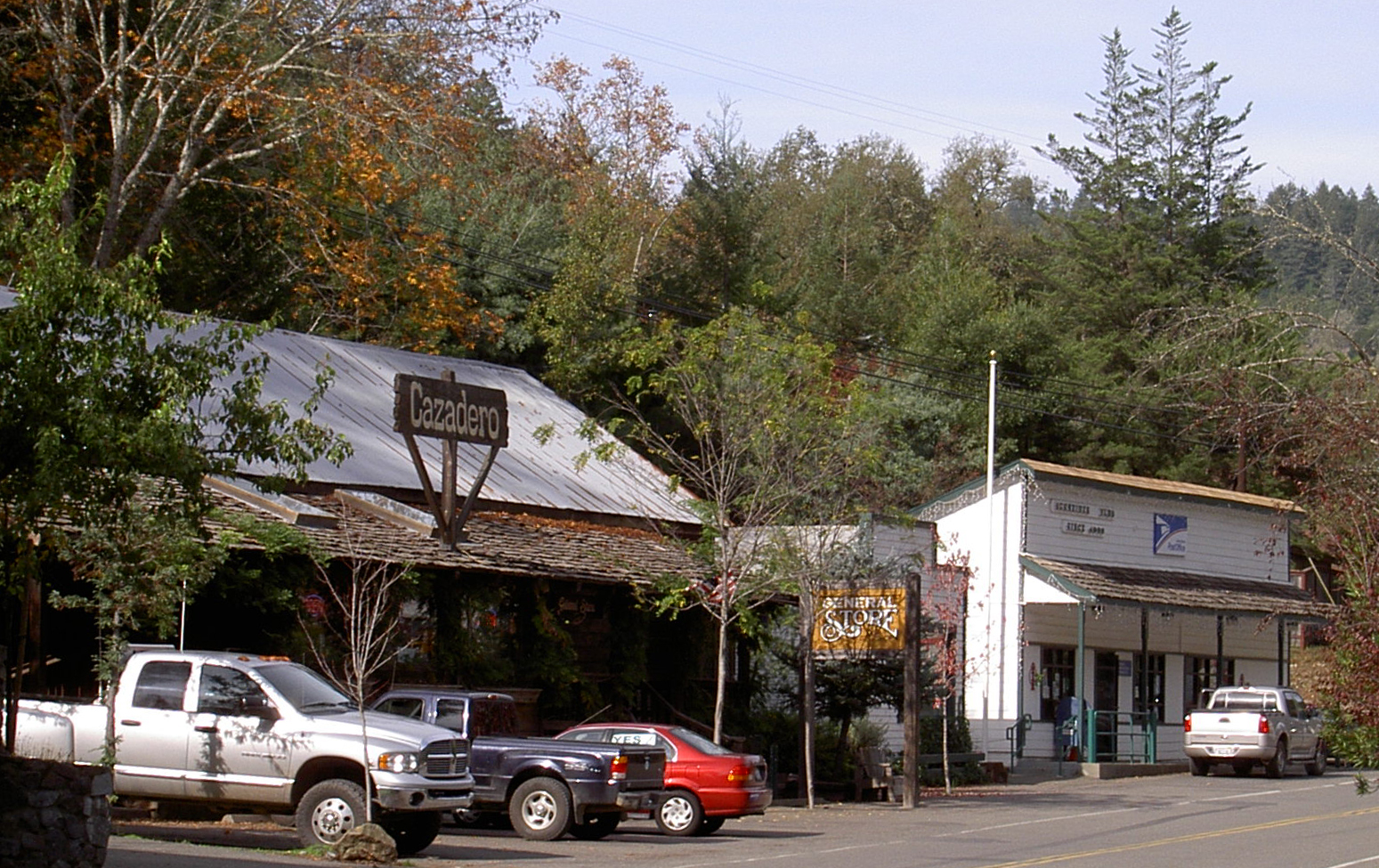
- Cazadero in November, 2009

- Location within the state of California
- Coordinates: 38°32′0″N 123°5′7″W
- Country: United States
- State: California
- County: Sonoma

Area
  - Total: 7.12 sq mi (18.43 km^{2})
  - Land: 7.12 sq mi (18.43 km^{2})
  - Water: 0 sq mi (0.00 km^{2}) 0.02%
- Elevation: 118 ft (36 m)

Population (2020)
  - Total: 298
  - Density: 41.9/sq mi (16.17/km^{2})
- Time zone: UTC-8 (PST)
  - Summer (DST): UTC-7 (PDT)
- ZIP code: 95421
- Area code: 707
- FIPS code: 06-12146
- GNIS feature ID: 220749
- Website: https://www.cazadero-csd.org/

Cazadero (Spanish for "hunting ground") is an unincorporated community and census-designated place (CDP) in western Sonoma County, California, United States with a population of 298 in 2020. The downtown of Cazadero consists of two churches, a general store, a post office, a hardware store, an auto repair garage, private office space, and the Cazadero Volunteer Fire Department.

Cazadero is the general area from the confluence of Austin Creek and the Russian River at the intersection of California State Route 116 and Cazadero Highway running north to the small town of the same name. The town is approximately 6 miles (9.7 km) from Route 116. Cazadero Highway parallels Austin Creek, which is a principal tributary of the lower Russian River. Located in the Sonoma Coast AVA, Cazadero can also be considered part of Wine Country.

== History ==
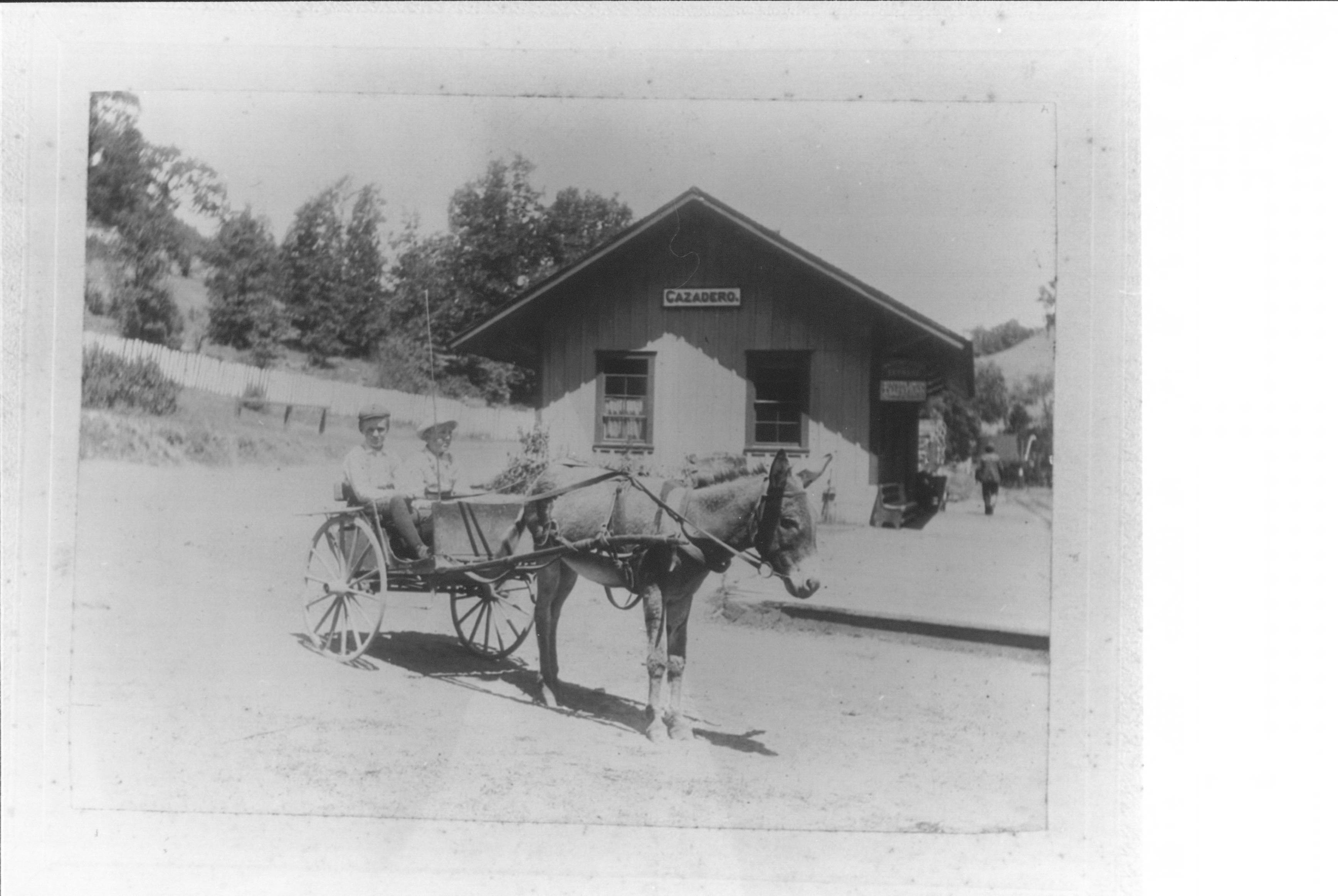
Depot in Cazadero, 1890

Cazadero was the northern terminus of the North Pacific Coast Railroad, originally laid as narrow-gauge track in the 1870s. This railhead was fed by several smaller-gauge systems dedicated to logging and networks of logging roads and trails which brought trees to Duncans Mill for processing and shipment south to San Francisco. Local legend holds that much of San Francisco was rebuilt after the disastrous April 1906 earthquake and fire using redwood and other lumber from the Cazadero area. Cazadero timbers are also known to have been used in pilings sunk to support the old eastern span of the San Francisco–Oakland Bay Bridge (which was replaced by a new span in 2013; the old eastern span was subsequently demolished.) The sawmills in Cazadero had faced financial hardship in the 1990s and currently there is only one sawmill still in operation as of 2026.

== Geography ==
Many creeks in Cazadero join Austin Creek as it makes its way to the Russian River. The principal tributary in the area is Kidd Creek, which finds its source on the southeast slopes of Pole Mountain which rises to approximately 2,204 feet (672 m) just a few miles from the Pacific coastline. Kidd Creek flows west to east in two main forks which join near the CazSonoma Inn before flowing into Austin Creek about 3 miles (4.8 km) south of town. The rapid rise in elevation from the coast to mountains west of Cazadero ensures that the area receives substantial rainfall as Pacific storms come onshore in spring and winter, releasing rain from clouds saturated with ocean moisture. Cazadero receives an average of 85 in (2,200 mm) of rain a year, and is reputed to be the second-wettest town in California, after Gasquet.

According to the United States Census Bureau, the CDP covers an area of 7.1 square miles (18.4 km^{2}), 99.98% of which is land and 0.02% of which is water. The ZIP Code covers approximately 216 square miles (559.4 km^{2}).

=== Climate ===
This region includes both coastal cool and coastal warm microclimates. Coastal cool has summer highs in the 70s °F, and winter lows in the 40s °F. Coastal warm has summer highs in the 80s and 90s °F.

== Demographics ==
Historical population
| Census | Pop. | Note | %± |
|---|---|---|---|
| 2010 | 354 | | — |
| 2020 | 298 | | −15.8% |
| 2021 (est.) | 351 | ▲ | 17.8% |
U.S. Decennial Census; 1860–1870 1880-1890; 1900 1910 1920; 1930 1940 1950; 1960 1970 1980; 1990 2000 2010; 2020

Cazadero first appeared as a census designated place in the 2010 U.S. census.

=== Racial and ethnic composition ===
Cazadero CDP, California – Racial and ethnic composition Note: the US Census treats Hispanic/Latino as an ethnic category. This table excludes Latinos from the racial categories and assigns them to a separate category. Hispanics/Latinos may be of any race.
| Race / Ethnicity (NH = Non-Hispanic) | Pop 2010 | Pop 2020 | % 2010 | % 2020 |
|---|---|---|---|---|
| White alone (NH) | 310 | 258 | 87.57% | 86.58% |
| Black or African American alone (NH) | 1 | 0 | 0.28% | 0.00% |
| Native American or Alaska Native alone (NH) | 3 | 5 | 0.85% | 1.68% |
| Asian alone (NH) | 3 | 2 | 0.85% | 0.67% |
| Native Hawaiian or Pacific Islander alone (NH) | 0 | 0 | 0.00% | 0.00% |
| Other race alone (NH) | 0 | 2 | 0.00% | 0.67% |
| Mixed race or Multiracial (NH) | 14 | 12 | 3.95% | 4.03% |
| Hispanic or Latino (any race) | 23 | 19 | 6.50% | 6.38% |
| Total | 354 | 298 | 100.00% | 100.00% |

=== 2020 census ===
As of the 2020 census, Cazadero had a population of 298. The population density was 41.9 inhabitants per square mile (16.2/km^{2}). The racial makeup of Cazadero was 258 (86.6%) White, 0 (0.0%) African American, 6 (2.0%) Native American, 2 (0.7%) Asian, 0 (0.0%) Pacific Islander, 5 (1.7%) from other races, and 27 (9.1%) from two or more races. Hispanic or Latino of any race were 19 persons (6.4%).

0.0% of residents lived in urban areas, while 100.0% lived in rural areas.

The whole population lived in households. There were 146 households, out of which 17 (11.6%) had children under the age of 18 living in them, 62 (42.5%) were married-couple households, 17 (11.6%) were cohabiting couple households, 29 (19.9%) had a female householder with no partner present, and 38 (26.0%) had a male householder with no partner present. 49 households (33.6%) were one person, and 28 (19.2%) were one person aged 65 or older. The average household size was 2.04. There were 75 families (51.4% of all households).

The age distribution was 45 people (15.1%) under the age of 18, 12 people (4.0%) aged 18 to 24, 65 people (21.8%) aged 25 to 44, 89 people (29.9%) aged 45 to 64, and 87 people (29.2%) who were 65 years of age or older. The median age was 53.8 years. For every 100 females, there were 78.4 males, and for every 100 females age 18 and over there were 74.5 males age 18 and over.

There were 245 housing units at an average density of 34.4 units per square mile (13.3 units/km^{2}), of which 146 (59.6%) were occupied. Of these, 104 (71.2%) were owner-occupied, and 42 (28.8%) were occupied by renters. The homeowner vacancy rate was 0.0% and the rental vacancy rate was 0.0%.

The Cazadero zip code, 95421, has a population of about 1,592, and a housing density of 7 people per square mile.

== Parks and recreation ==
The area is home to a number of camps, including BSA Camp Royaneh, Camp Cazadero, and the Cazadero Performing Arts Camp.

== Education ==
The school districts are Montgomery Elementary School District and West Sonoma County Union High School District.

The Montgomery district has one school, Montgomery Elementary School.
