= List of species endemic to the San Francisco Bay Area =

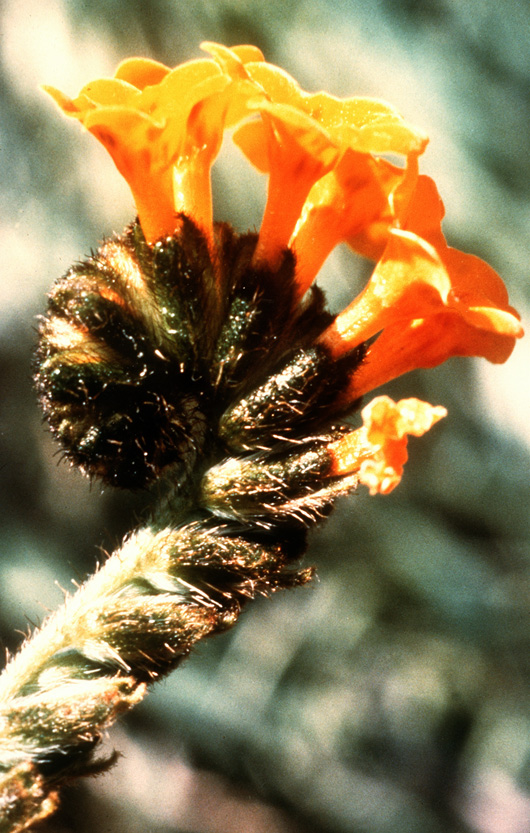
Amsinckia grandiflora (large-flowered fiddleneck)

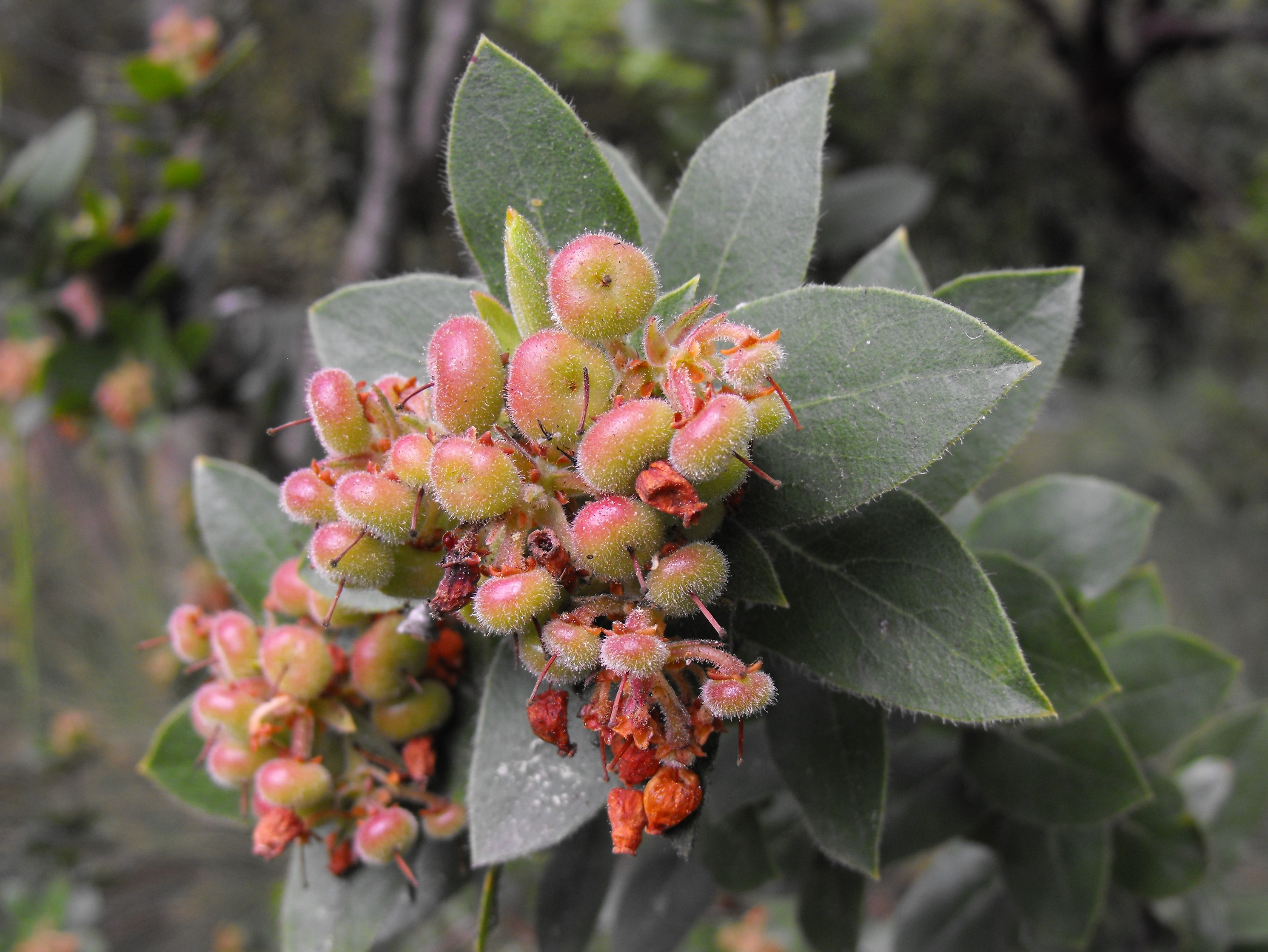
Arctostaphylos montaraensis (Montara manzanita)

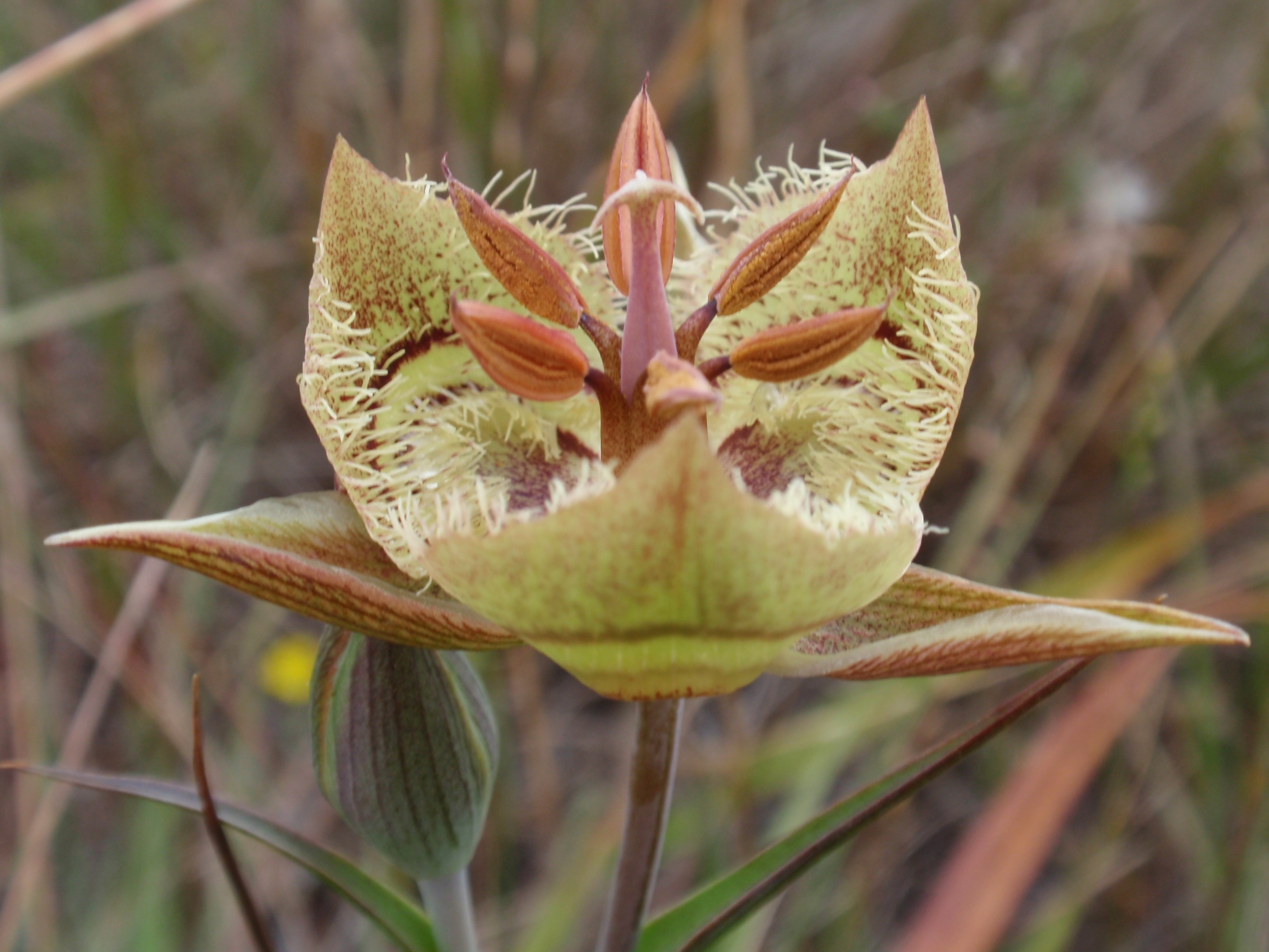
Calochortus tiburonensis (Tiburon mariposa lily)

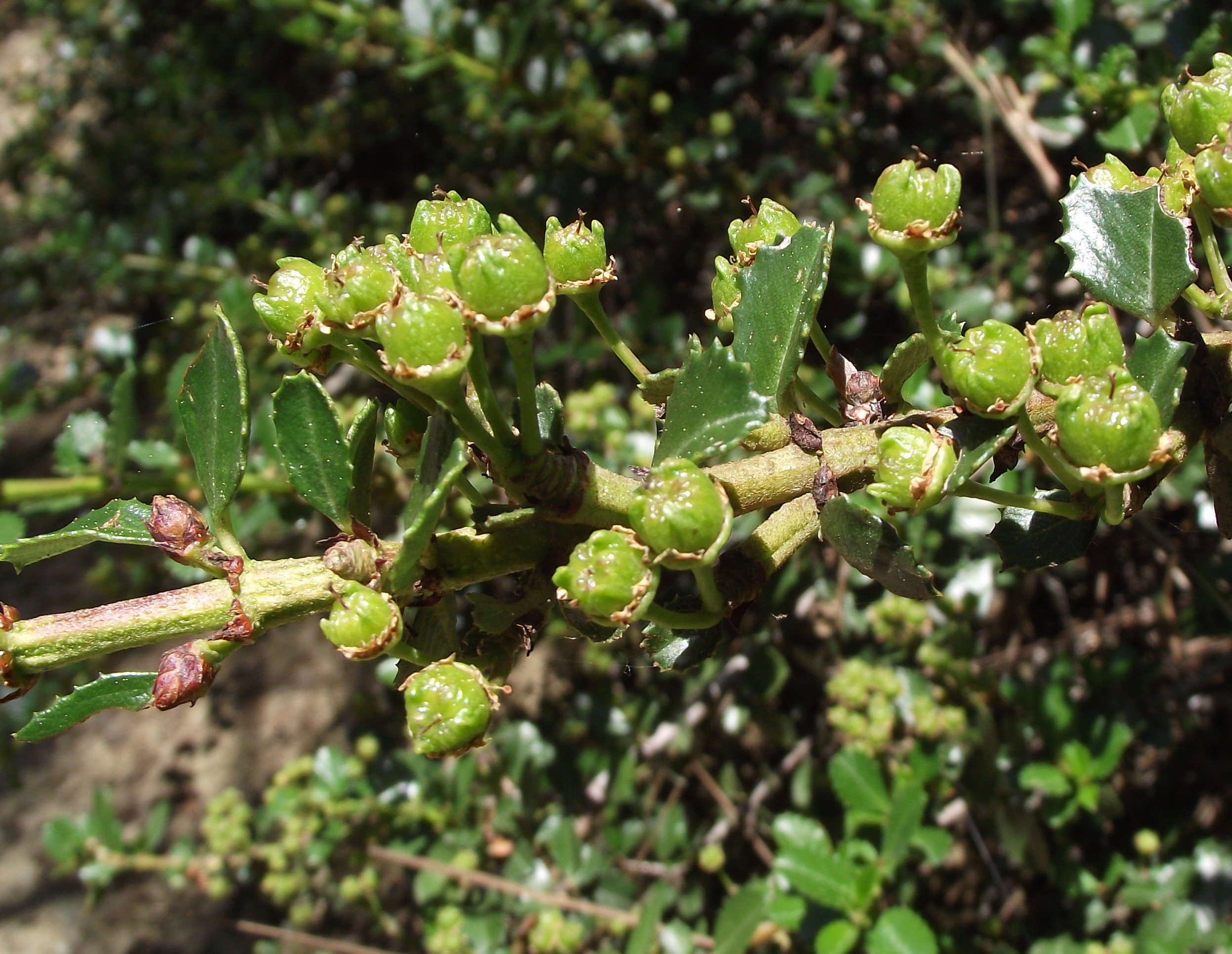
Ceanothus masonii

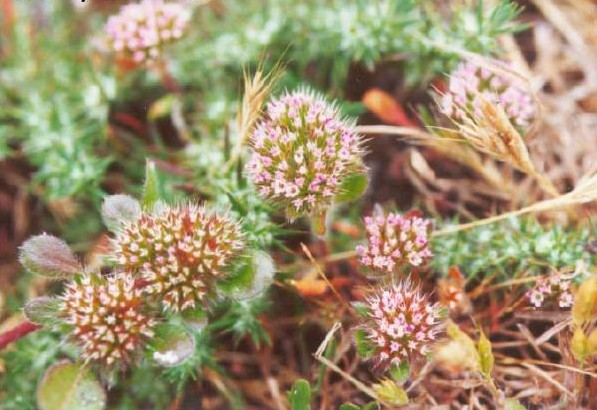
Chorizanthe valida

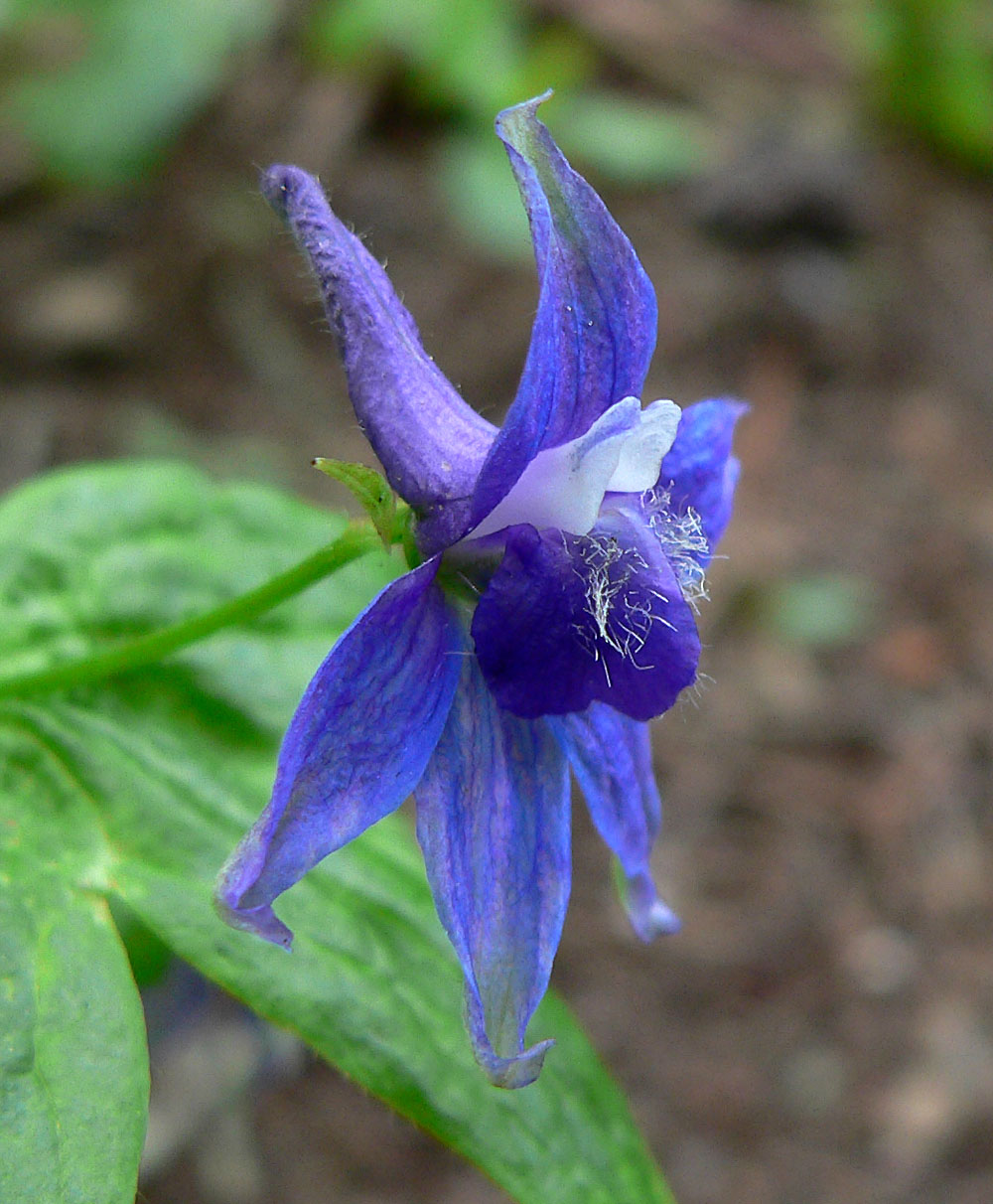
Delphinium bakeri

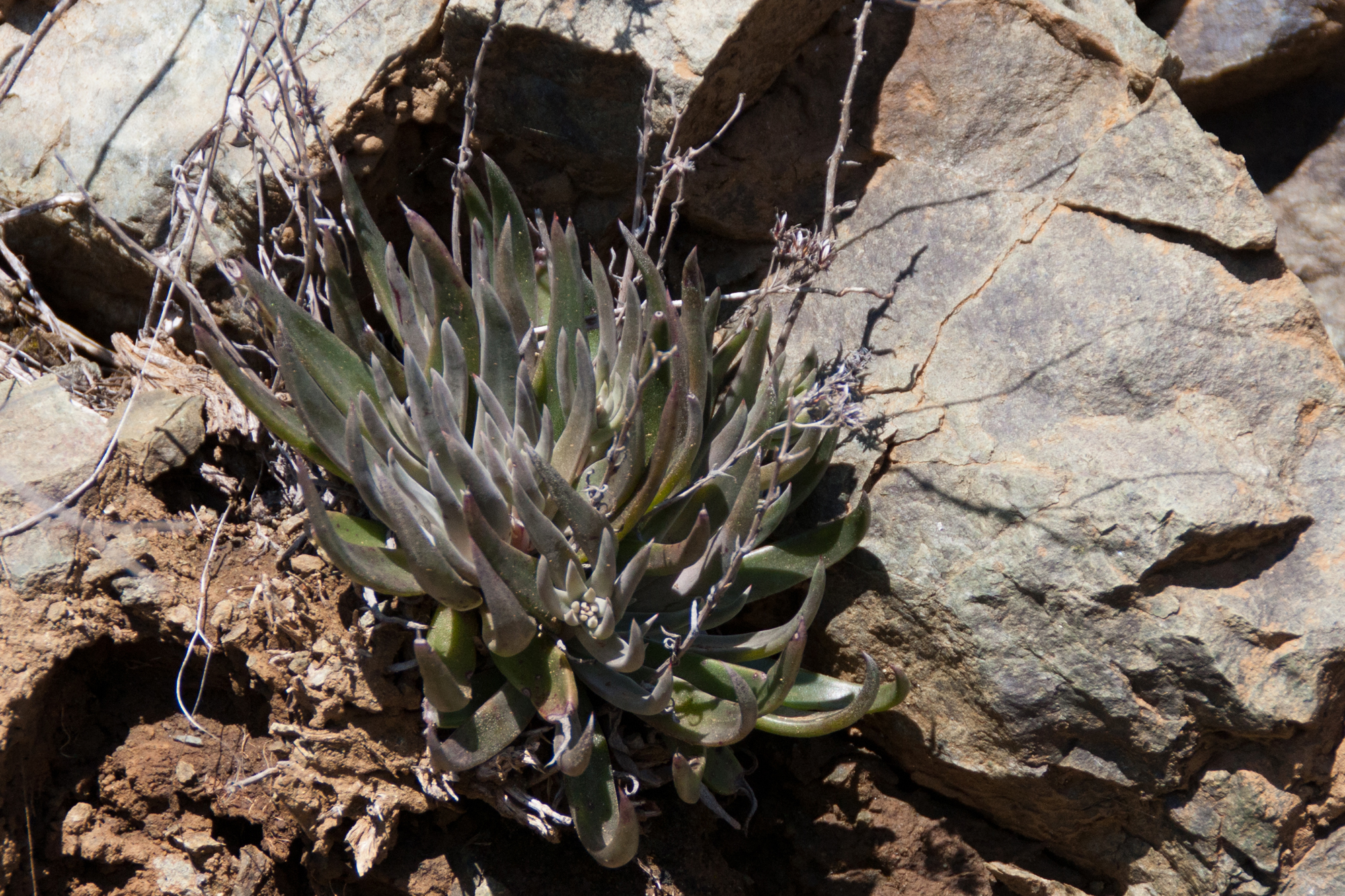
Dudleya setchellii

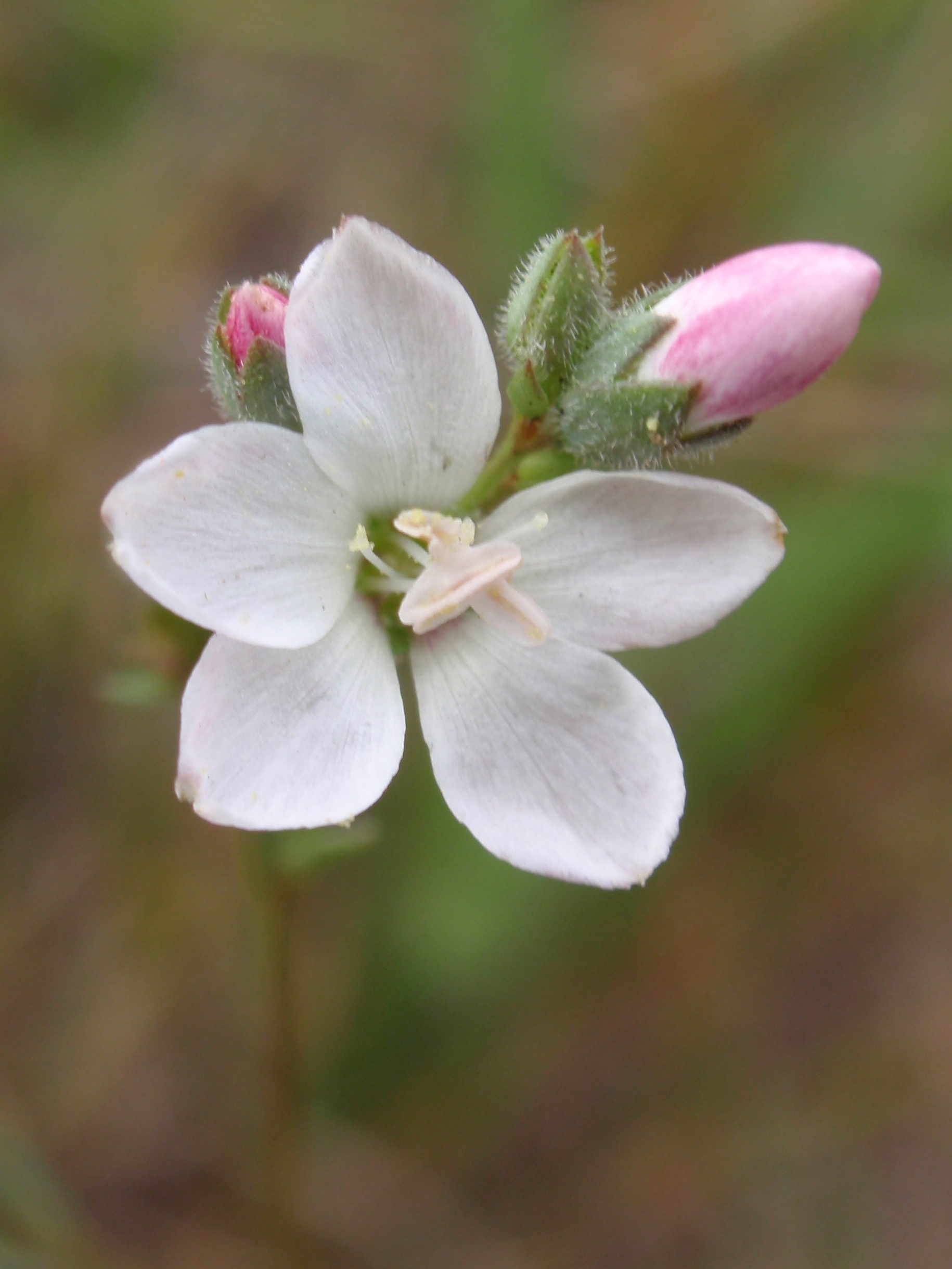
Hesperolinon congestum (Marin dwarf flax)

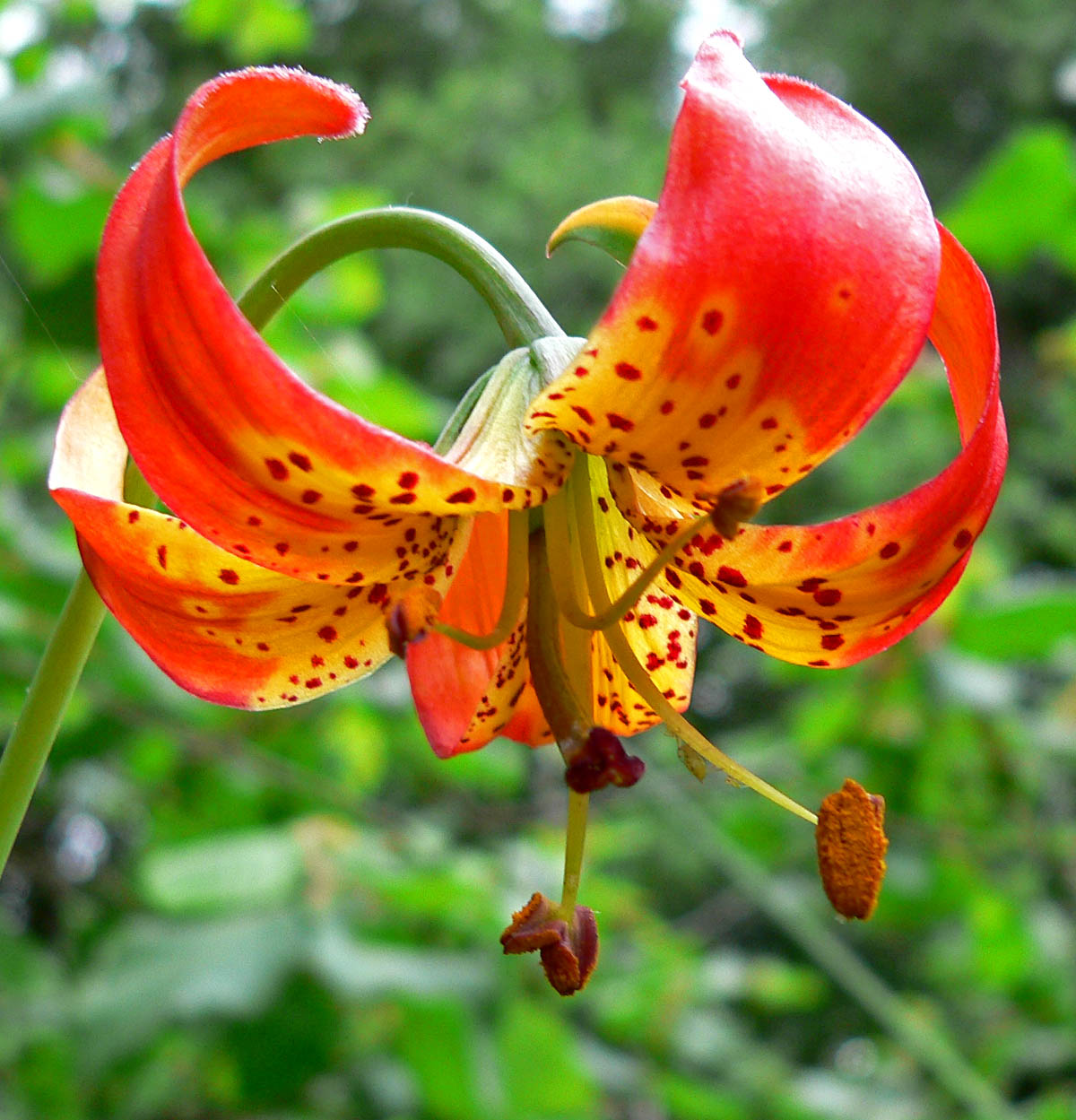
Lilium pardalinum subsp. pitkinense

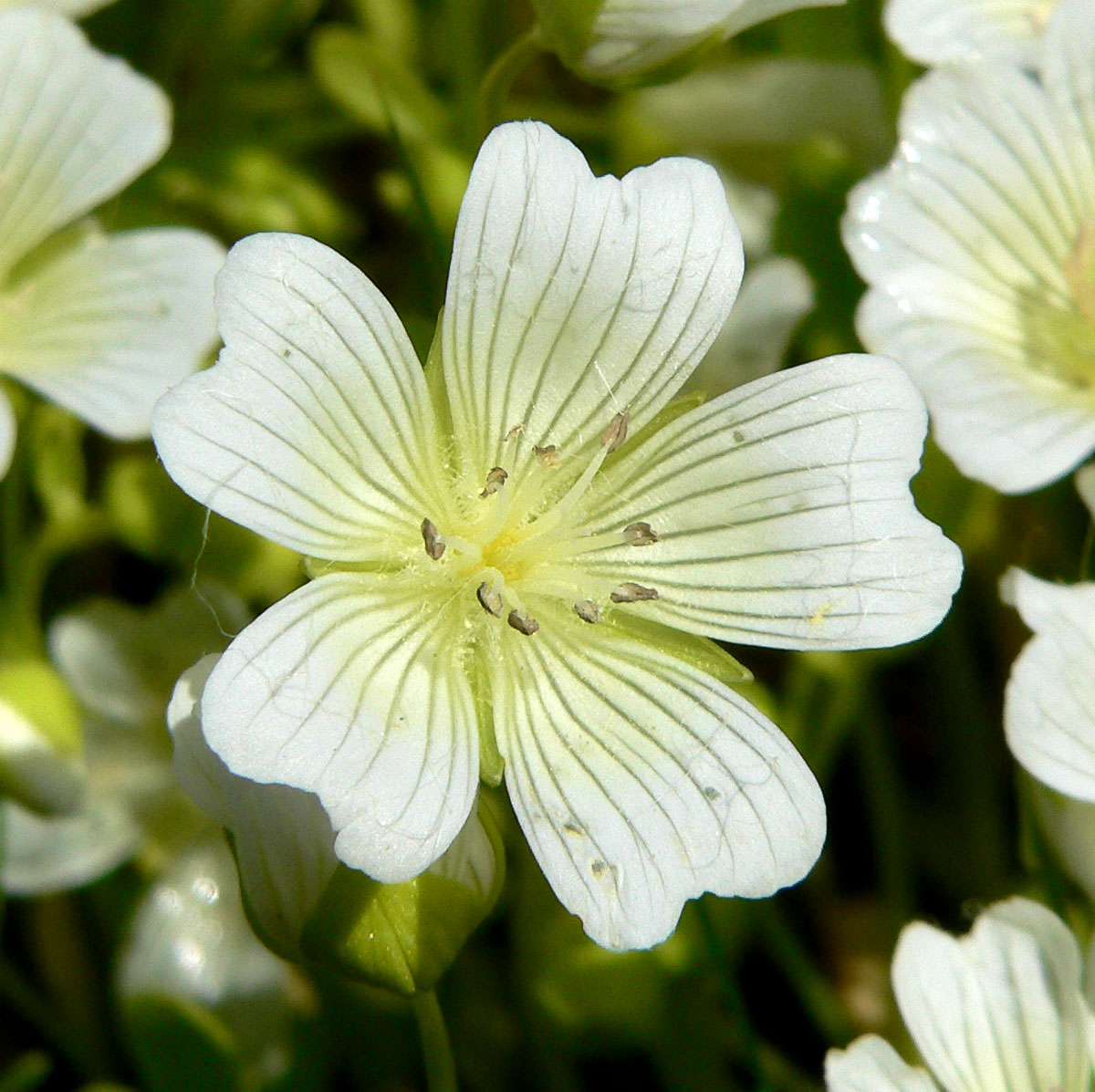
Limnanthes vinculans

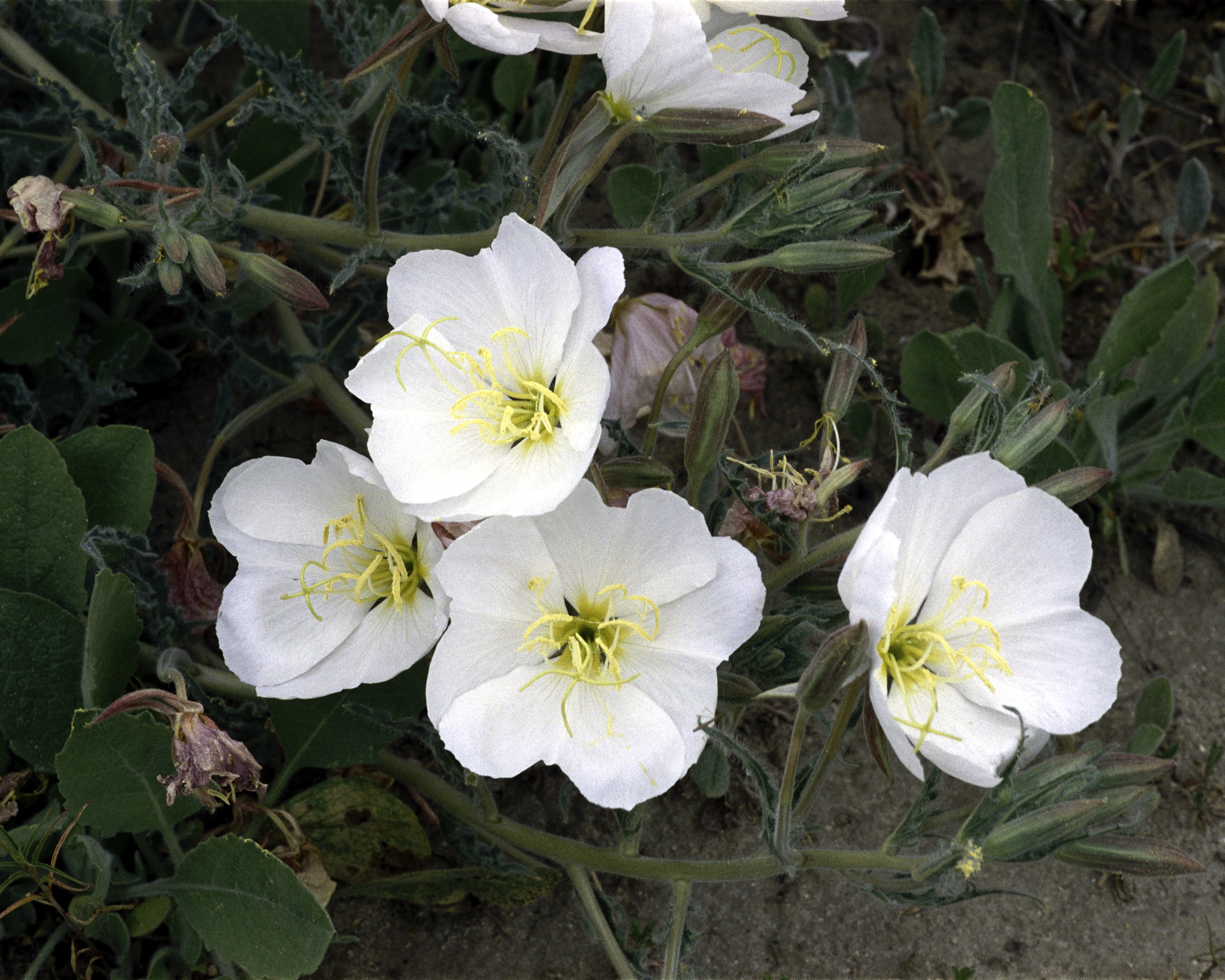
Oenothera deltoides subsp. howellii (Antioch Dunes evening primrose)

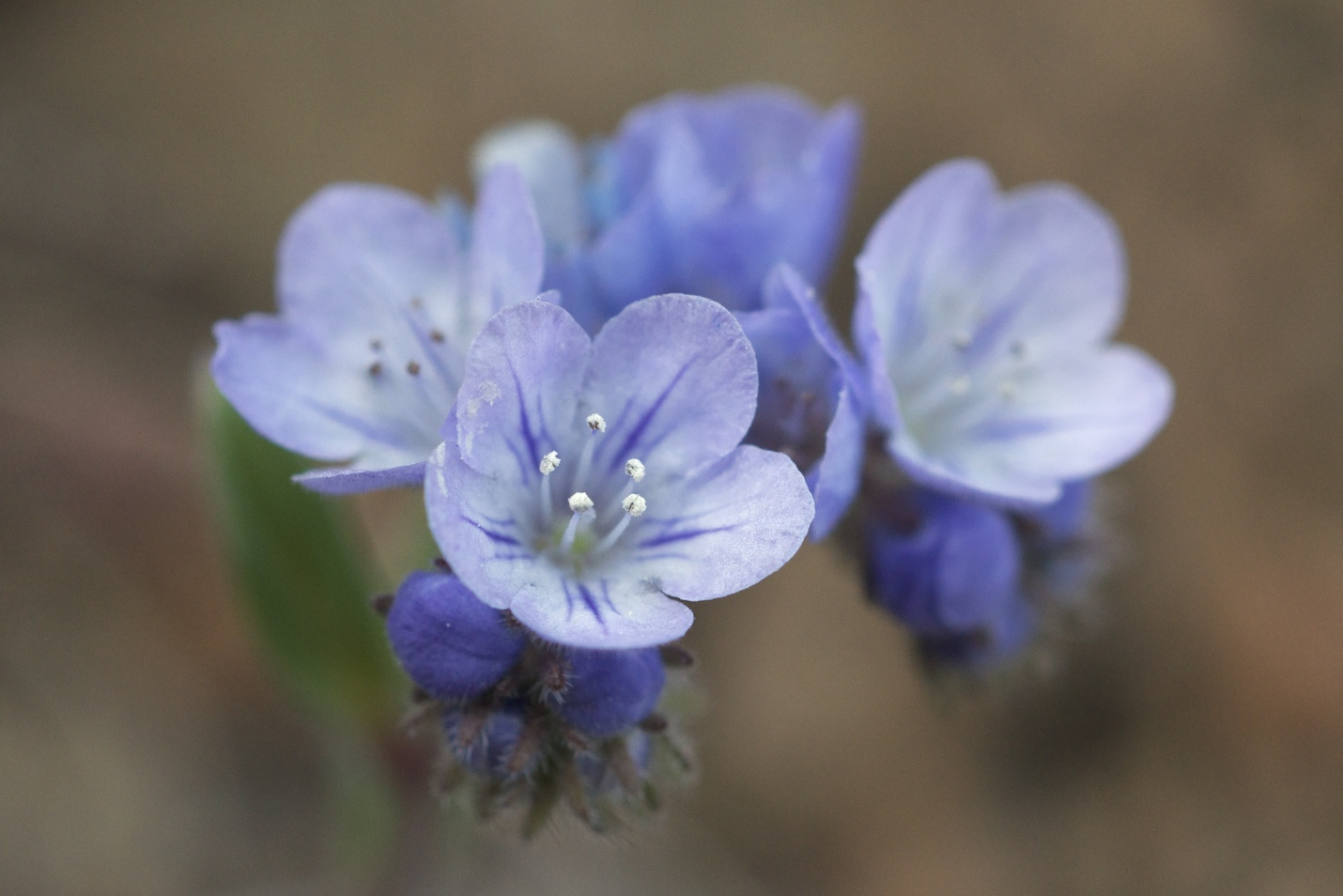
Phacelia breweri

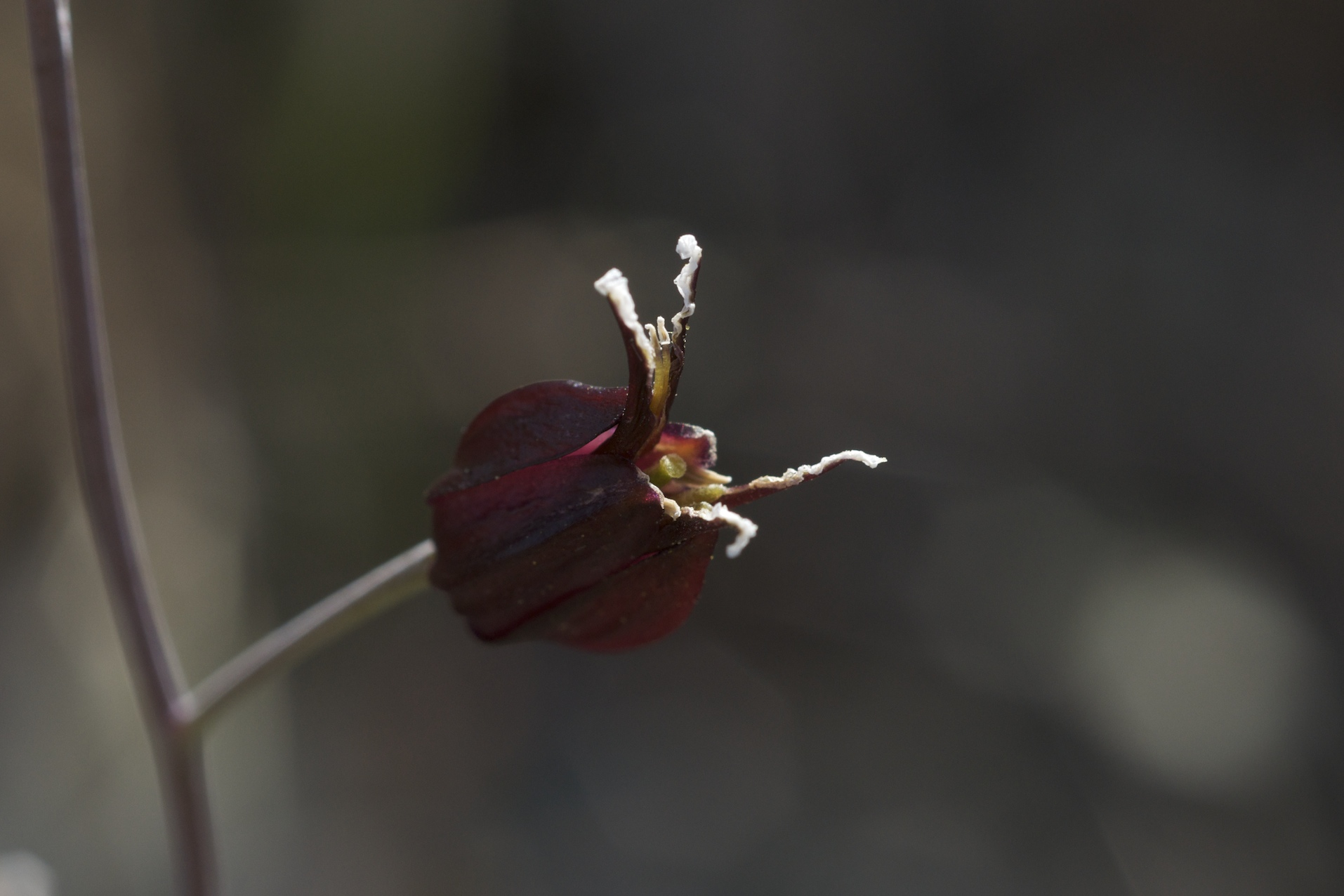
Streptanthus niger

This is a list of species endemic to the San Francisco Bay Area, the nine California counties which border on San Francisco Bay. The area has a number of highly diverse, local bioregions, including San Bruno Mountain.

== Flora ==
=== A ===
- Acanthomintha duttonii, common names San Mateo thornmint or Dutton's acanthomintha, found at Montara Mountain in San Mateo County
- Amsinckia grandiflora, common name large-flowered fiddleneck, found near the Lawrence Livermore National Laboratory in Alameda County
- Arctostaphylos bakeri, common name Baker's manzanita, found in Sonoma County
- Arctostaphylos densiflora, common name Vine Hill manzanita, found on land owned and protected by the California Native Plant Society, near Sebastopol, in Sonoma County
- Arctostaphylos hookeri, common name Franciscan manzanita, found in The Presidio, San Francisco, in San Francisco County
- Arctostaphylos imbricata, common name San Bruno Mountain manzanita, found on San Bruno Mountain in San Mateo County
- Arctostaphylos montaraensis, common name Montara manzanita, found on San Bruno Mountain and Montara Mountain in San Mateo County
- Arctostaphylos pallida, common names pallid manzanita, Oakland Hills manzanita, and Alameda manzanita, found in the eastern San Francisco Bay Area
- Arctostaphylos virgata, common names Bolinas manzanita and Marin manzanita, found in Marin County

=== B ===
- Blennosperma bakeri, common names Baker's stickyseed and Sonoma sunshine, found in Sonoma County

=== C ===
- Calochortus raichei, common names Cedars fairy-lantern and Cedars mariposa lily, found in Sonoma County
- Calochortus tiburonensis, common name Tiburon mariposa lily, found at Ring Mountain in Marin County
- Carex albida, common name white sedge, found in Sonoma County
- Ceanothus ferrisiae, common name coyote ceanothus, found at Mount Hamilton in Santa Clara County
- Ceanothus masonii
- Chorizanthe valida
- Clarkia imbricata
- Cordylanthus nidularius

=== D ===
- Deinandra bacigalupii
- Delphinium bakeri
- Delphinium luteum
- Dirca occidentalis
- Dudleya setchellii

=== E ===
- Elymus californicus
- Erigeron serpentinus
- Eriogonum cedrorum
- Eriogonum truncatum
- Eriophyllum latilobum

=== H ===
- Hesperolinon congestum, common name Marin dwarf flax

=== I ===
- Isocoma arguta

=== L ===
- Lessingia micradenia
- Lilium pardalinum subsp. pitkinense
- Limnanthes vinculans

=== O ===
- Oenothera deltoides subsp. howellii

=== P ===
- Pentachaeta bellidiflora
- Phacelia breweri
- Phacelia phacelioides
- Plagiobothrys strictus
- Poa napensis
- Polygonum marinense

=== S ===
- Sidalcea hickmanii ssp. viridis
- Streptanthus batrachopus
- Streptanthus callistus
- Streptanthus hispidus
- Streptanthus niger

== Fauna ==
- Apodemia mormo langei
- Bay checkerspot
- California lizardfish
- Calosima munroei
- Helobdella californica
- Mission blue butterfly
- Porcellio formosus
- California clapper rail, also found nominally in other locales, this bird has gotten extensive attention in the Bay Area
- Salt marsh harvest mouse
- San Bruno elfin butterfly
- San Francisco garter snake, San Mateo and northern Santa Cruz County
- Sorex ornatus sinuosus
- Syncaris pacifica
- Thicktail chub

=== Endangered or extinct ===
- Xerces blue, was found in San Francisco
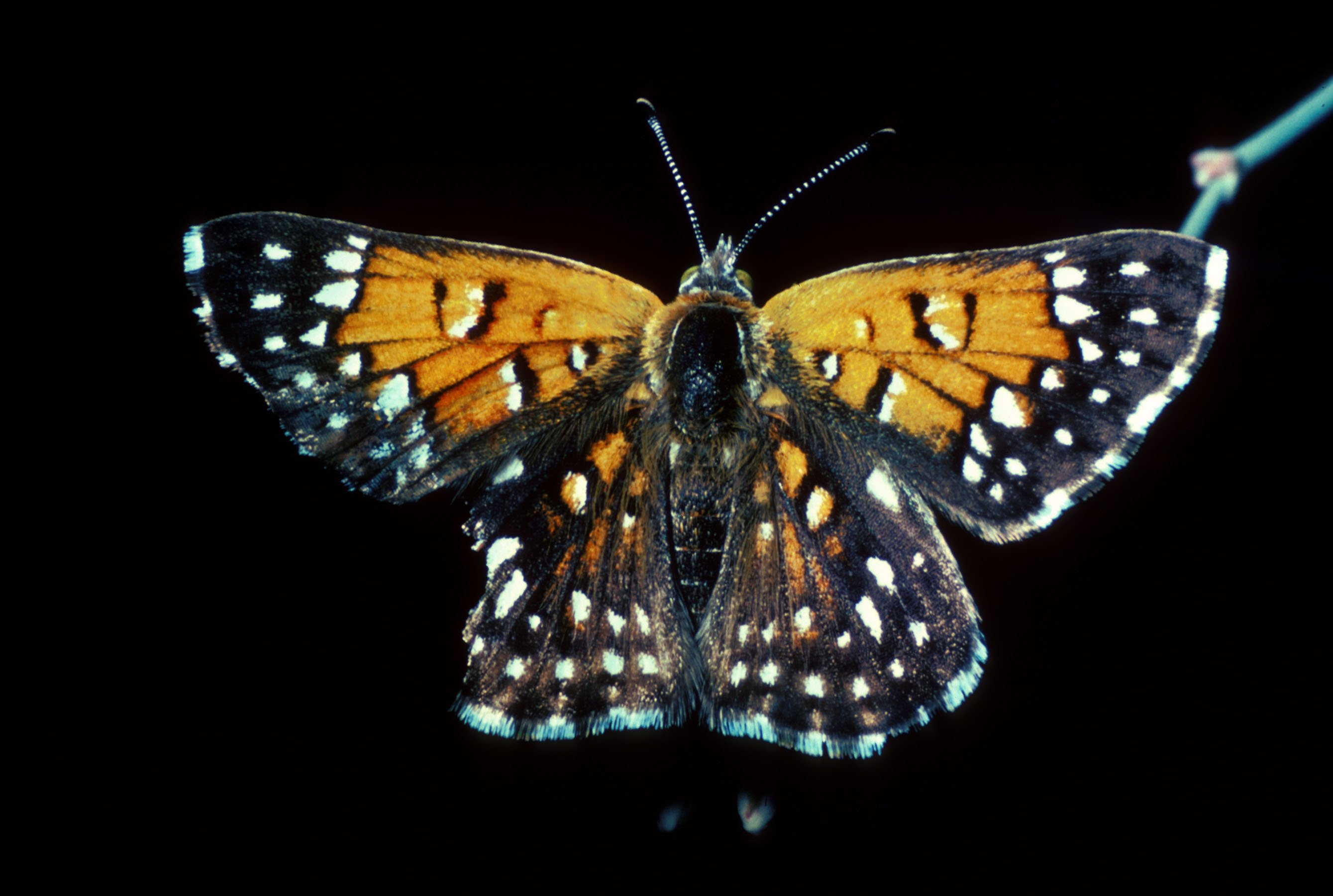
Apodemia mormo langei

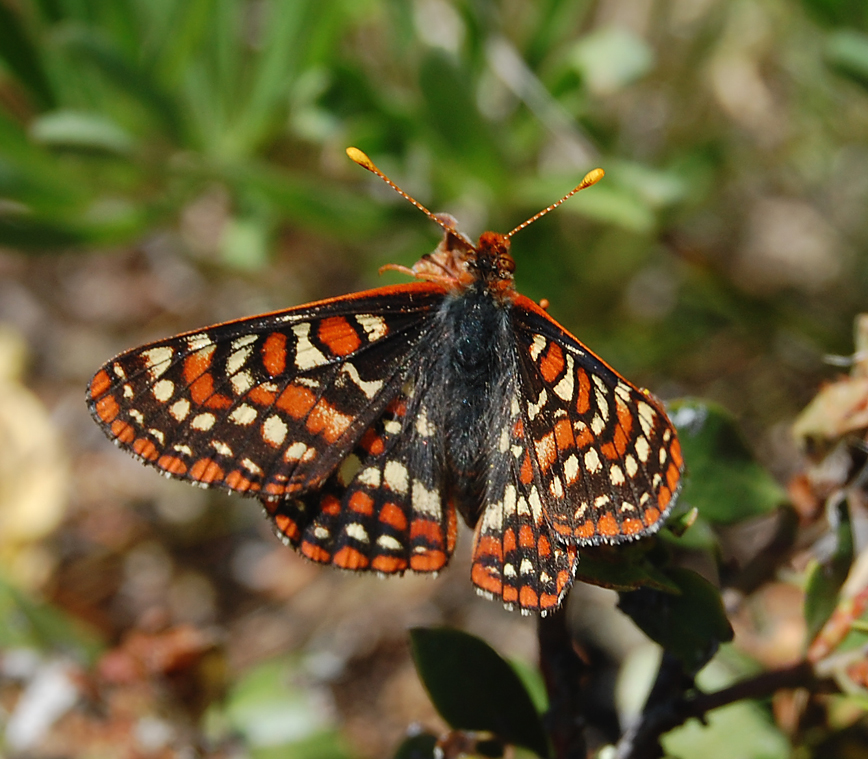
Bay checkerspot

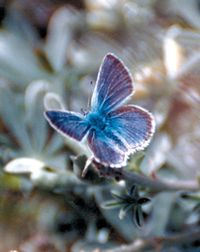
Mission blue butterfly

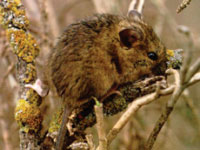
Reithrodontomys raviventris (salt marsh harvest mouse)

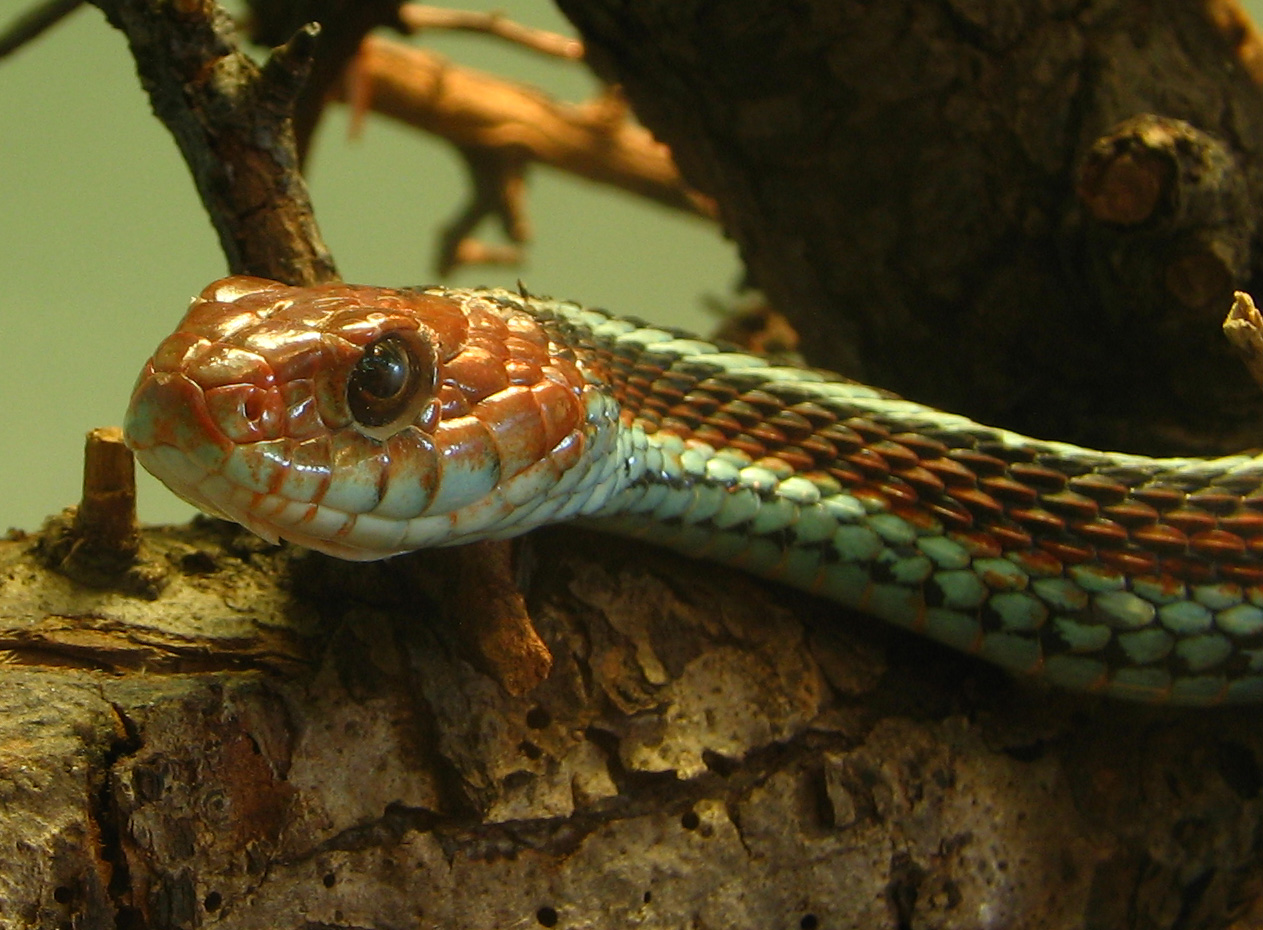
San Francisco garter snake

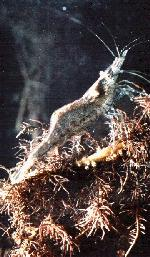
Syncaris pacifica

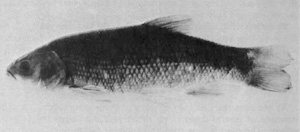
Thicktail chub

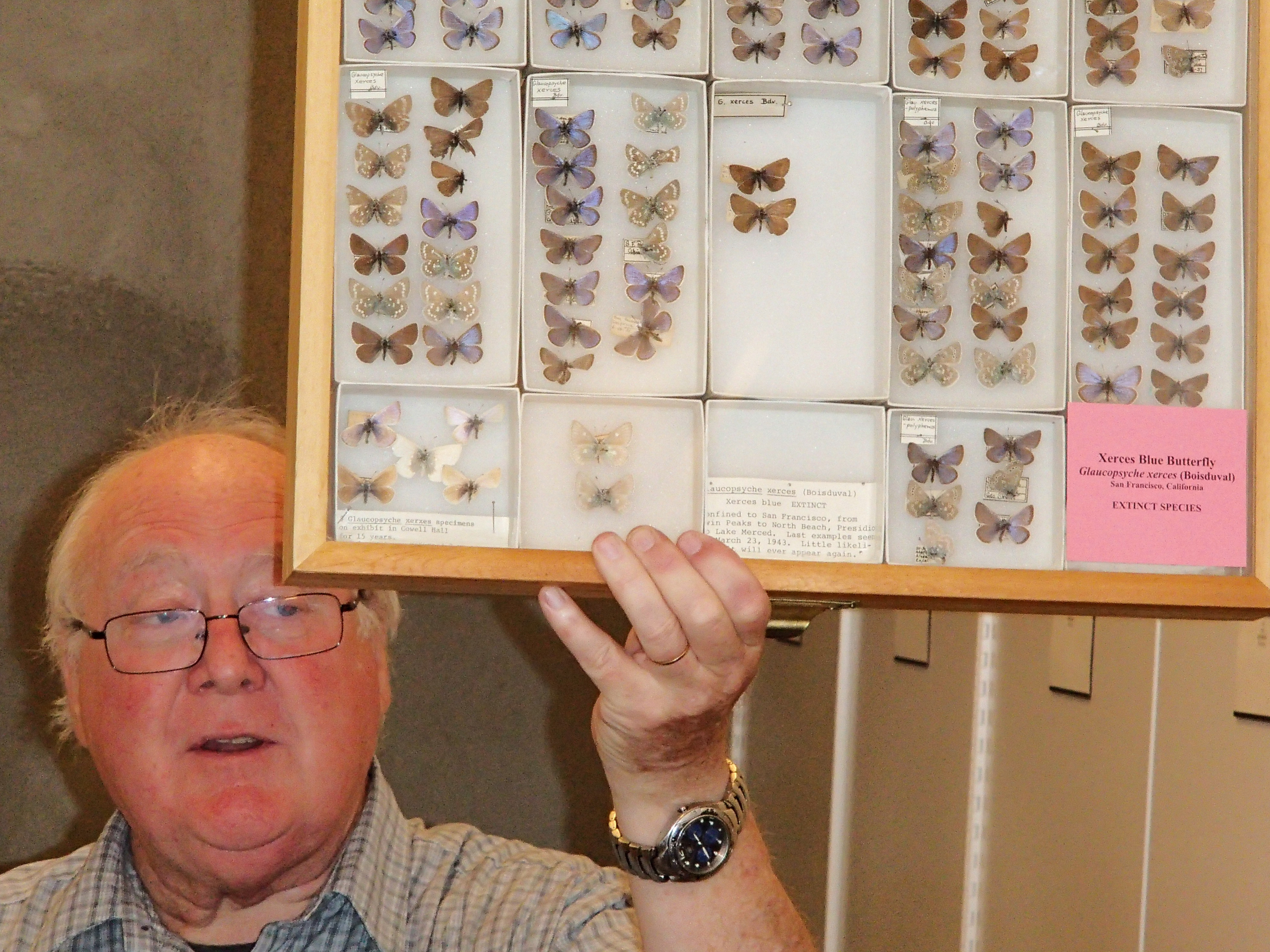
Xerces blue specimens
