= Cilia- and flagella-associated protein 95 =

Mammalian protein found in Homo sapiens

CFAP95

Identifiers
- Aliases: CFAP95, chromosome 9 open reading frame 135, C9orf135, cilia and flagella associated protein 95
- External IDs: MGI: 1914733; GeneCards: CFAP95

Gene location (Human)
Chr.	Chromosome 9 (human)
Band	9q21.12	Start	69,820,817 bp
Band	9q21.12	End	69,906,227 bp

Gene location (Mouse)
Chr.	Chromosome 19 (mouse)
Band	19|19 B	Start	23,536,117 bp
Band	19|19 B	End	23,630,176 bp
RNA expression pattern
Bgee	Human / Mouse (ortholog); Top expressed in: bronchial epithelial cell; testicle; olfactory zone of nasal mucosa; sperm; mucosa of paranasal sinus; right uterine tube; nasal epithelium; epithelium of nasopharynx; pituitary gland; trachea / Top expressed in: seminiferous tubule; spermatid; spermatocyte; olfactory epithelium; Epithelium of choroid plexus; morula; embryo; utricle; vestibular sensory epithelium; right lung lobe; More reference expression data
BioGPS	n/a
Orthologs
Databases	NCBI: entry; OMA: entry
Species	Human	Mouse
Entrez	138255	67483
Ensembl	ENSG00000204711	ENSMUSG00000033053
UniProt	Q5VTT2	Q9CQC3
RefSeq (mRNA)	NM_001010940; NM_001308084; NM_001308085; NM_001308086	NM_026188
RefSeq (protein)	NP_001010940; NP_001295013; NP_001295014; NP_001295015	NP_080464
Location (UCSC)	Chr 9: 69.82 – 69.91 Mb	Chr 19: 23.54 – 23.63 Mb
PubMed search
- Wikidata
View/Edit Human	View/Edit Mouse

Cilia- and flagella-associated protein 95, also known as C9orf135, is a 229 amino acid protein that in humans is encoded by the CFAP95 gene. CFAP95 is located on Chromosome 9 of the Homo sapiens genome at 9q12.21. The protein has a transmembrane domain from amino acids 124-140 and a glycosylation site at amino acid 75. C9orf135 is part of the GRCh37 gene on Chromosome 9 and is contained within the domain of unknown function superfamily 4572. Also, c9orf135 is known by the name of LOC138255 which is a description of the gene location on Chromosome 9.1.

c9orf135 location on chromosome 9 and the neighboring genes.

There is some evidence associating the c9orf135 gene with premature ovarian failure. In affected women, an autosomal recessive microduplication occurs which may be linked to premature ovarian failure. A Single Nucleotide Polymorphism (SNP) the c9orf135 gene has been linked to Parkinson's disease; a statistically significant mutation has been seen on a Manhattan plot. Further research is required to establish whether c9orf135 relates to Parkinson's disease.

== mRNA ==
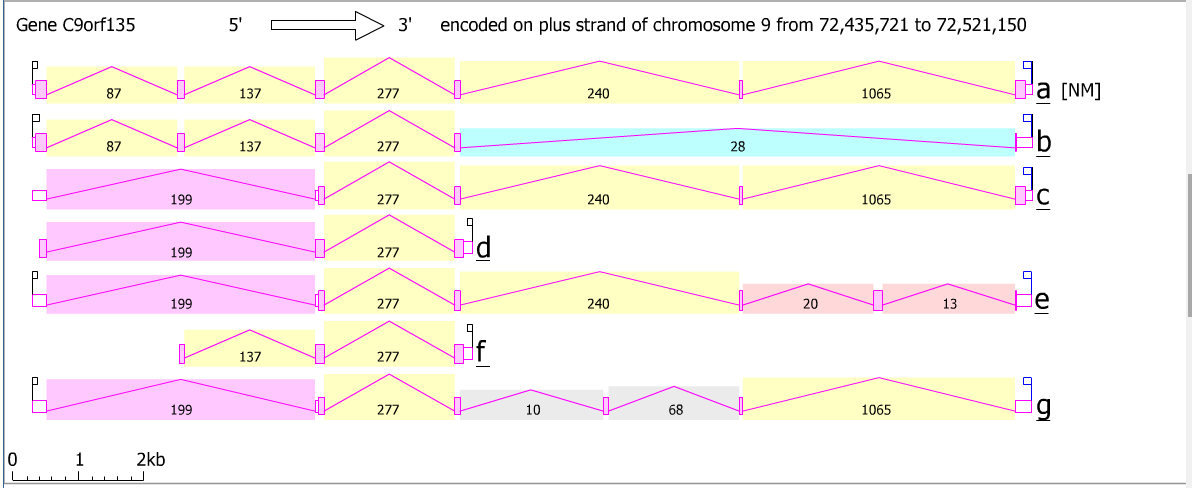
Splice Variants of c9orf135 based on NCBI AceView

The mRNA of c9orf135 is 906 nucleotides in length. The 5' and 3' Untranslated regions (UTR) contain hairpin loops. The 3' UTR comprises 123 nucleotides and the 5' UTR comprises 18 nucleotides. The mRNA encodes a protein with a secondary structure composed of both beta-sheets and alpha-helices.

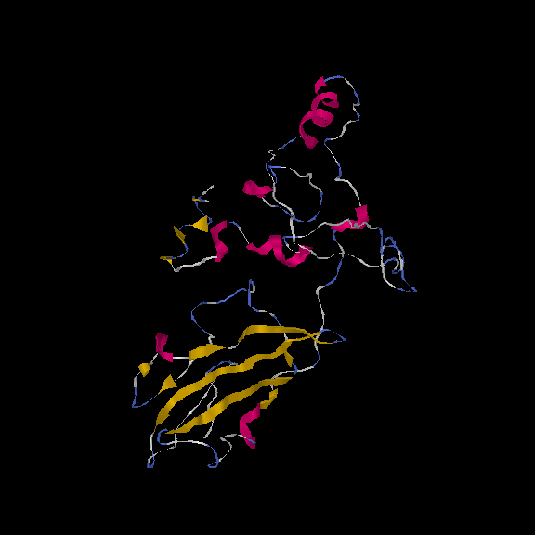
Secondary structure of c9orf135

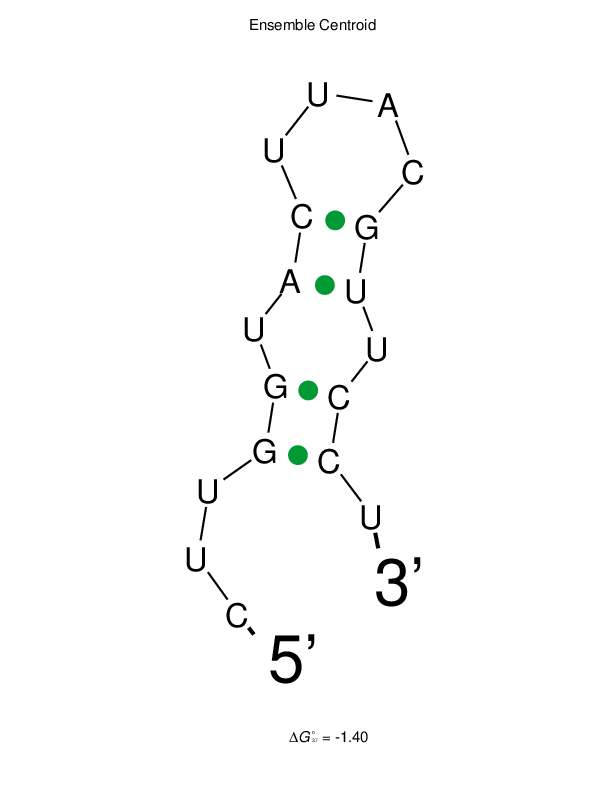
5' UTR loop structure of c9orf135 of mRNA

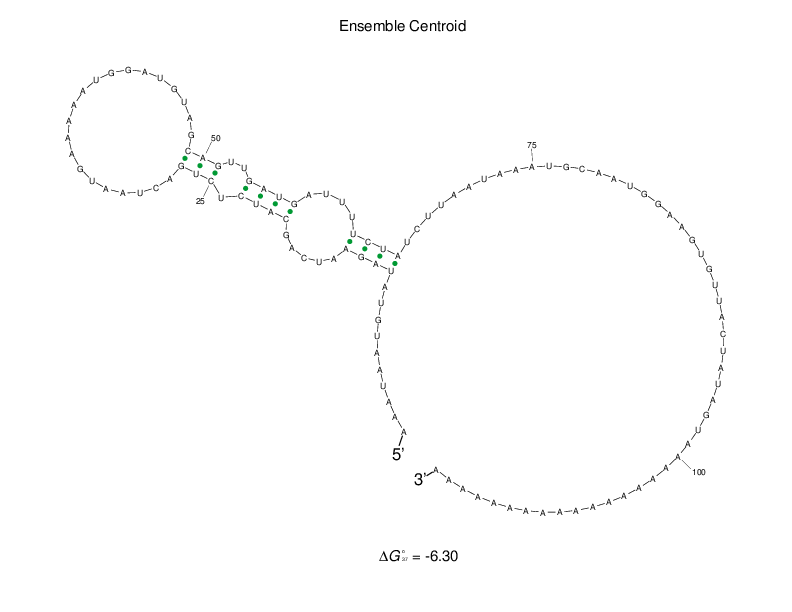
3' UTR loop structure of c9orf135 mRNA

== Protein ==
=== Properties of c9orf135 ===
It is likely that c9orf135 is a nuclear protein because it has properties that match attributes of nuclear proteins rather than secretory pathways. Furthermore, there is a nuclear localization signal (PEKVKKL) from amino acid 67 to 73 on c9orf135. C9orf135 is soluble with an average hydrophobicity of -0.772. The negative hydrophobicity value is due to its slightly acidic properties.

=== Post-translational modifications ===
Serine phosphorylation sites were seen at amino acid positions 7, 50, 86, 98, and 194. Threonine phosphorylation occurs at 34, 129, 155, and 201. Tyrosine phosphorylation sites occur at 78, 160, 177, and 209. Also, a N-terminal acetylation site is present at amino acid 3. A Signal cleavage site is present between amino acids 11 and 12.

=== Protein Interaction ===
PB2 interacts with c9orf135 which was found from a two-hybrid yeast assay. The information provided about PB2 (Polymerase Basic Protein 2) is that it is a viral protein that is involved with the influenza A virus. It is primarily involved in Cap stealing in which it binds the pre-mRNA cap an ultimately cleaves 10-13 nucleotides off. PB2 is also important for starting the replication of viral genomes. PB2 is also known to inhibit type 1 interferon by inhibiting the mitochondrial antiviral signalling protein MAVS.

=== Mutations ===
Eleven different common DNA genome variants of the human c9orf135 gene have been identified. All of the mutations within those genome variants have been compiled into the following table. Mutations that were present at levels of 0.01 frequency or higher have been incorporated into the table; synonymous mutations were excluded.

Location	Amino Acid Position	Mutation	Frequency
5' UTR	57	N/A	0.386
5' UTR	93	N/A	0.047
5' UTR	138	N/A	0.018
Exon	169	Missense K30T	0.018
Exon	237	Missense R53K	0.047
Exon	456	Missense E126K	0.01

== Gene Expression ==
c9orf135 is expressed in connective tissue and testicular tissue at high levels. It is likely that the expression of c9orf135 is expressed at low levels throughout human cells. It was also found that c9orf135 is found at significantly higher levels in the adult human umbilical cord versus the foetal human umbilical cord. Furthermore, in women with ovarian adenocarcinoma the expression of c9orf135 is much higher in the epithelial cells within the ovaries. Women with polyendocrine metabolic ovarian syndrome (PMOS) have a lower expression of c9orf135 than those people who do not have the condition.

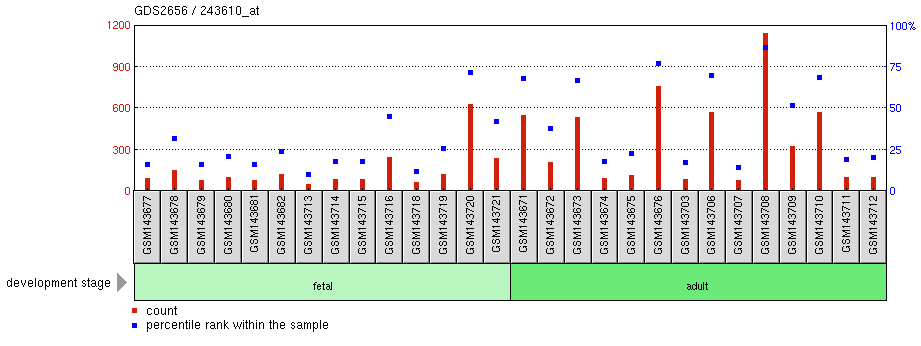
Fetal and Adult Umbilical cord expression

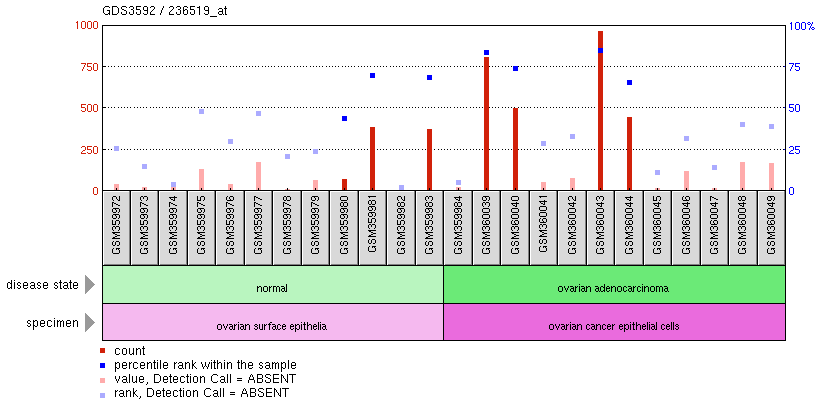
Ovarian normal surface epithelia and ovarian cancer epithelial cells

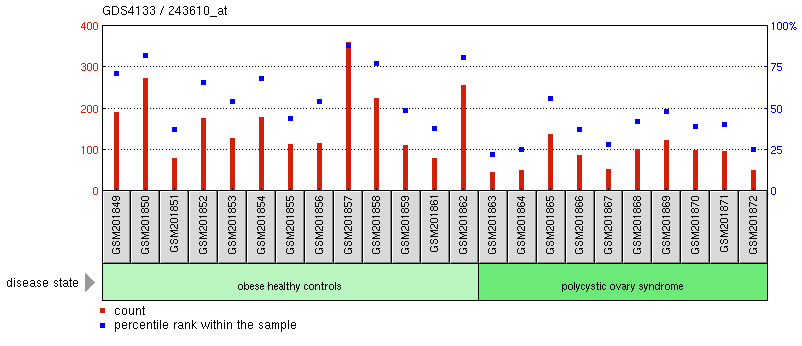
Polyendocrine metabolic ovarian syndrome versus obese women regarding c9orf135.

=== Amino Acid Quantity ===
A comparison between the c9orf135 from Mus musculus (House Mouse) and Pteropus alecto (Black Flying Fox) is described here. There were no significant amino acids that differed in c9orf135 from the rest of the mouse body. However, in the Black Flying Fox, it was valine poor and tryptophan rich. As seen from the human results, the Black Flying fox only shared the tryptophan surplus results. The House Mouse and Black Flying Fox were both used because they shared 64% and 79% similarity in the c9orf135 genome respectively. Analysis demonstrates that alanine and tyrosine could predict points of interest because they both contained results differing from the rest of the human gene averages.

Amino Acid of Interest	Compositional Percentage	Compared to normal protein amounts in H. sapiens
Alanine	3.1%	Less than Average
Tyrosine	5.2%	More than Average
Tryptophan	3.1%	More than average

== Homology ==
c9orf135 is conserved through eukaryotes, ranging from mammals, reptiles and Annelida.

=== Orthologs ===
The orthologs of c9orf135 were sequenced in BLAST and 20 orthologs were picked. The orthologs were all multicellular organisms and were limited to aquatic animals, reptiles, amphibians, and warm-blooded animals. Also, protists, bacteria, archea, and fungi did not have orthologs. However, no paralogs were found when c9orf135 was sequenced in BLAST. Please refer to the spreadsheet for the complete list of orthologs to c9orf135. Time tree was a program that was used to find the evolutionary branching shown in MYA There were no paralogs found for c9orf135.

Genus/Species	Common name	Divergence from Humans (MYA)	Accession number	Amino Acid Length	Sequence identity	Sequence similarity
Homo sapiens	Human	--	Q5VTT2	229	--	--
Pongo abelii	Sumatran Orangutan	15.8	XP_002819904	206	86%	87%
Rhinopithecus roxellana	Golden Snub-Nosed Monkey	29.1	XP_010361250	229	93%	95%
Mus musculus	House Mouse	90.9	EDL41604	228	64%	73%
Pteropus alecto	Black Flying Fox	97.5	XP_785964	230	79%	86%
Equus przewalskii	Przewalski's horse	97.5	XP_008504806	183	77%	86%
Panthera tigris altaica	Siberian Tiger	97.5	XP_007077537	187	73%	83%
Ovis aries	Sheep	97.5	XP_014948670	207	69%	77%
Elephantulus edwardii	Cape Elephant Shrew	105	XP_006894485	254	72%	82%
Pelodiscus sinensis	Chinese Softshell Turtle	320.5	XP_006137902	217	55%	68%
Gekko japonicus	Gekko	320.5	XP_015275999	221	52%	64%
Alligator mississippiensis	American Alligator	320.5	XP_014464144	212	51%	64%
Ophiophagus hannah	King Cobra	320.5	ETE61720	215	43%	59%
Salmo salar	Atlantic Salmon	429.6	XP_013998840	99	34%	55%
Esox lucius	Northern Pike	429.6	XP_010901691	154	30%	47%
Branchiostoma floridae	Lancelet	733	XP_002591786	221	45%	59%
Strongylocentrotus purpuratus	Sea Urchin	747.8	XP_785964	241	47%	62%
Saccoglossus kowalevskii	Acorn Worm	747.8	XP_002733410	153	38%	58%
Lingula anatina	Ocean Clam	847	XP_013398605	220	43%	59%
Crassostrea gigas	Pacific Oyster	847	XP_011426944	215	40%	57%
Helobdella robusta	Leech	847	XP_009019861	256	29%	44%

=== Divergence of c9orf135 ===
A divergence comparison of c9orf135 with fast diverging cytochrome C, and slow diverging fibrinogen is shown in the chart. Overall, c9orf135 has diverged significantly quicker than fibrinogen and slightly slower than cytochrome C.

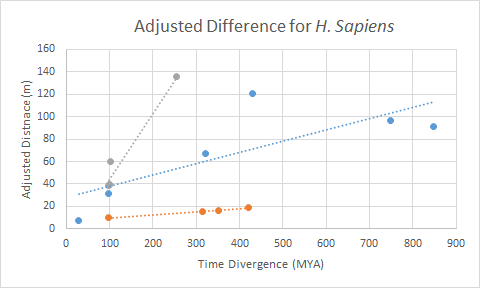
