= FAM78B =

Protein found in humans

Identifiers
- Aliases: FAM78B, Fam78b, family with sequence similarity 78 member B
- External IDs: MGI: 2443050; GeneCards: FAM78B

Gene location (Human)
Chr.	Chromosome 1 (human)
Band	1q24.1	Start	166,057,426 bp
Band	1q24.1	End	166,167,001 bp

Gene location (Mouse)
Chr.	Chromosome 1 (mouse)
Band	1|1 H2.3	Start	166,828,986 bp
Band	1|1 H2.3	End	166,918,871 bp
RNA expression pattern
Bgee	Human / Mouse (ortholog); Top expressed in: endothelial cell; Brodmann area 23; primary visual cortex; testicle; middle temporal gyrus; prefrontal cortex; right hemisphere of cerebellum; gastrocnemius muscle; right frontal lobe; dorsolateral prefrontal cortex / Top expressed in: neural layer of retina; transitional epithelium of urinary bladder; superior frontal gyrus; ganglionic eminence; primary visual cortex; dentate gyrus of hippocampal formation granule cell; placenta; cerebellar cortex; decidua; trigeminal ganglion; More reference expression data
BioGPS	n/a
Orthologs
Databases	NCBI: entry; OMA: entry
Species	Human	Mouse
Entrez	149297	226610
Ensembl	ENSG00000188859	ENSMUSG00000060568
UniProt	Q5VT40	Q8BQN5
RefSeq (mRNA)	NM_001017961; NM_001320302	NM_001160261; NM_001160262; NM_175461
RefSeq (protein)	NP_001017961; NP_001307231	NP_001153733; NP_001153734; NP_780670
Location (UCSC)	Chr 1: 166.06 – 166.17 Mb	Chr 1: 166.83 – 166.92 Mb
PubMed search
- Wikidata
View/Edit Human	View/Edit Mouse

Family with Sequence Similarity 78-Member B (FAM78B) is a protein of unknown function in humans that is encoded by the FAM78B gene (1q24.1). It has orthologous genes and predicted proteins in vertebrates and several invertebrates, but not in arthropods. It has a nuclear localization signal in the protein sequence and a miRNA target region in the mRNA sequence.

== Evolutionary analysis ==
=== Homology ===
FAM78B has one paralog, FAM78A, and is conserved throughout many species. Orthologs can be found throughout all vertebrates excluding arthropods. FAM78B is also found in several invertebrates including the pacific oyster and liver fluke. FAM78A, its paralog, is also found to be conserved in more invertebrates such as the tunicates, worms, and leeches, and make up the distant homologs of FAM78B. The table below contains a list of FAM78B orthologs with percent identity values and time since divergence values relative to the human FAM78B gene or protein.

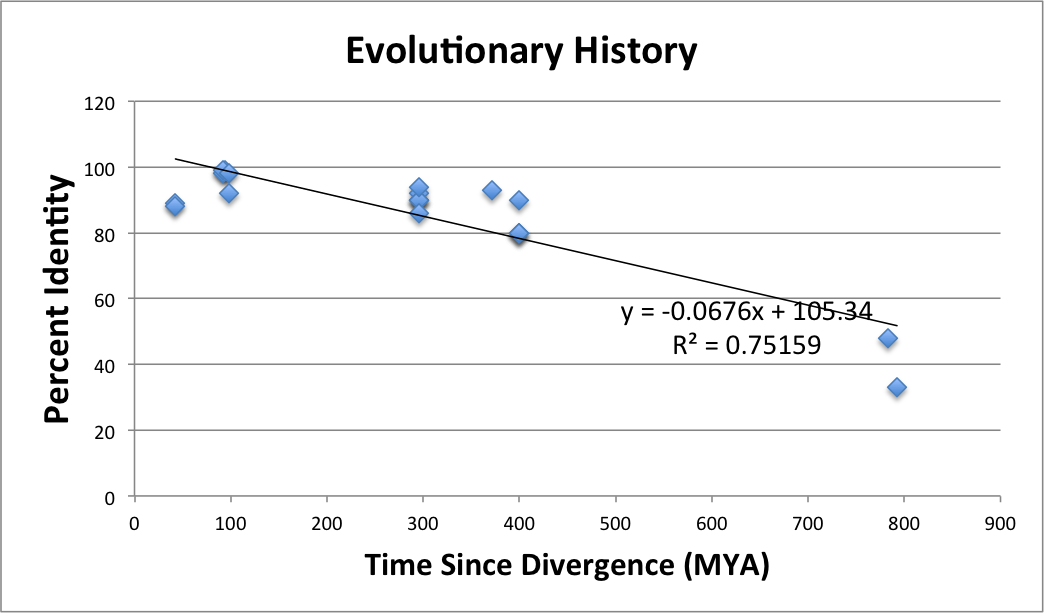
Evolutionary history of FAM78B comparing percent identity versus time (millions of years)

Genus and species	Common name	Date of divergence from human lineage (millions of years ago)	Accession number	Sequence length (bp or aa)	Protein/mRNA identity (%)	Query cover (%)
Crassostrea gigas	Pacific oyster	782.7	EKC28338.1	267	48	79
Clonorchis sinensis	Liver fluke	792.4	GAA32739.1	295	33	84
Xiphophorus maculatus	Platyfish	400.1	XP_005802428.1	285	80	100
Takifugu rubripes	Pufferfish	400.1	XP_003975800.1	261	80	100
Danio rerio	Zebrafish	400.1	XP_001338241.2	285	80	100
Lepisosteus oculatus	Spotted gar	400.1	XP_006635127.1	261	90	100
Xenopus (Silurana) tropicalis	Western clawed frog	371.2	XP_002933818.1	263	93	100
Alligator mississippiensis	Alligator	296	XP_006276782.1	261	92	100
Anolis carolinensis	Anole lizard	296	XP_003219922.1	261	90	100
Gallus gallus	Chicken	296	XP_001232254.1	261	90	100
Pseudopodoces humilis	Groundpecker	296	XP_005528713.1	261	90	100
Columba livia	Rock dove	296	XP_005499081.1	238	86	93
Pelodiscus sinensis	Soft shell turtle	296	XP_006128883.1	216	94	72
Trichechus manatus latirostris	Manatee	98.7	XP_004385839.1	242	78	100
Camelus ferus	Camel	94.2	XP_006194022.1	261	99	100
Mus musculus	Mouse	92.3	NP_780670.2	262	98	100
Microtus ochrogaster	Prairie vole	92.3	XP_005370139.1	261	99	100
Loxodonta africana	Elephant	98.7	XP_003415081.1	999	99	98
Macaca fascicularis	Crab eating macaque	42.6	EHH50788.1	233	89	100
Pan paniscus	Bonobo	42.6	XP_003824811.1	243	88	100

== Structure ==
=== Gene ===
The FAM78B gene is located on the sense (negative) strand of chromosome 1 at location 1q24.1 and spans the chromosomal locus 166039271-166135909, covering a total of 96,638 base pairs along the chromosome, the FAM78B gene has 2 exons in its transcript mRNA of 1,481 bp. FAM78B in humans is separated into two exons that have 95,243 bp of introns between them. The gene is highly conserved in vertebrates (excluding arthropods) and the pacific clam and liver fluke.

=== mRNA ===
There is one isoform that has been identified in humans and is composed of two exons that composes a mRNA of 1,481 bp.

=== Protein ===
The FAM78B protein has a calculated molecular weight of 30 kDa, has a higher relative abundance of tryptophan (W), has a more greatly conserved c-terminal region, is composed of both alpha helix and beta strand, and resides in the nucleus of the cell after transcription

==== General properties ====
The protein FAM78B consists of 254 amino acids with a predicted molecular weight of 30 kDal. The protein has an isoelectric point of 9.6. FAM78B has a highly conserved C terminus among its orthologs and is histidine poor. The highest conserved amino acids are ISDSDG from aa 104-110, WLVA from aa 171-175, VDP---L--R from aa 199-208, and the C' terminus, but especially NADQVLMW from aa 240-247.

==== Conservation ====
The amino acid sequence for FAM78B is highly conserved in mammals, having around 86% to 100% sequence similarity. Birds, frogs, mammals, and lizards also have a high degree of similarity to the human FAM78B sequence with similarities between 76% and 83%. Fish have between 56% and 66% sequence similarity. The C terminal end is the most highly conserved across ortholog-containing species from mammals to the pacific sea clam. [4]

== Regulation ==
=== mRNA level ===
There is one miRNA binding site targeted by miR-24 for sequence CUGAGCCA in Homo sapiens located on the 3' end of the mRNA at 88-95 after the stop codon (bp 167,091,390-167,091,397 on chromosome 1). Stem loop from 155-172 of the 3' end of the mRNA matches with the miRNA site.

=== Protein level ===
Conserved nuclear localization signal (RPKR) from aa 248-252.

== Expression ==
FAM78B is generally ubiquitously expressed and is highly expressed in regions of the brain.

== Clinical relevance ==
FAM78B is statistically significantly correlated to chronic kidney disease when there is one of three different single nucleotide polymorphisms (SNPs) including two located in the intron (rs2116519 and rs4074897) and one located in the 5' UTR (rs987131).
