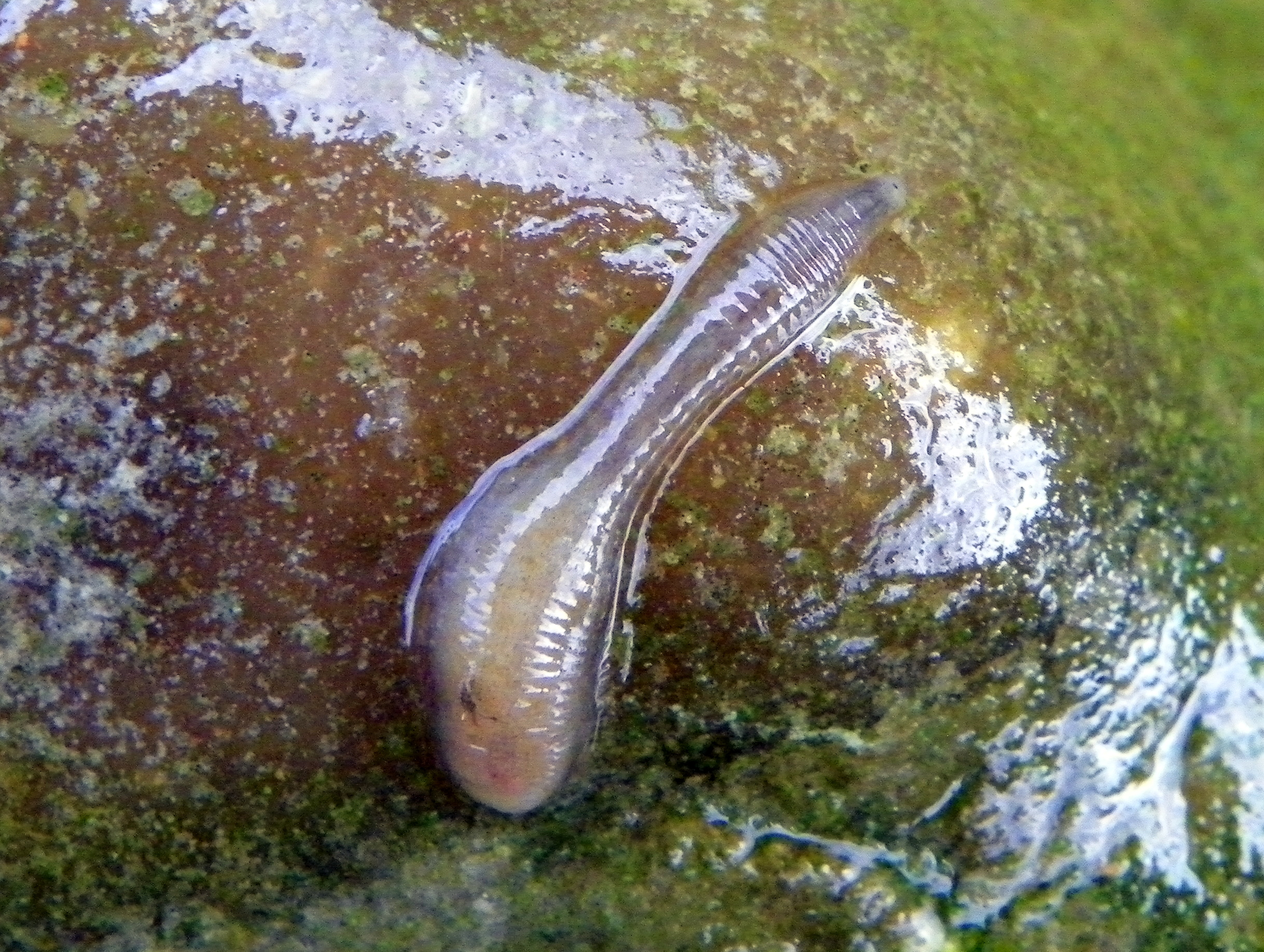

Scientific classification
- Kingdom: Animalia
- Phylum: Annelida
- Clade: Pleistoannelida
- Clade: Sedentaria
- Class: Clitellata
- Subclass: Hirudinea
- Order: Rhynchobdellida
- Family: Glossiphoniidae
- Genus: Helobdella
- Species: H. stagnalis

Binomial name
- Helobdella stagnalis (Linnaeus, 1758)

= Helobdella stagnalis =

Species of annelid worm

Helobdella stagnalis is a species of leech.

The species was described in 1758 by Carolus Linnaeus as Hirudo stagnalis.

It has cosmopolitan distribution.
