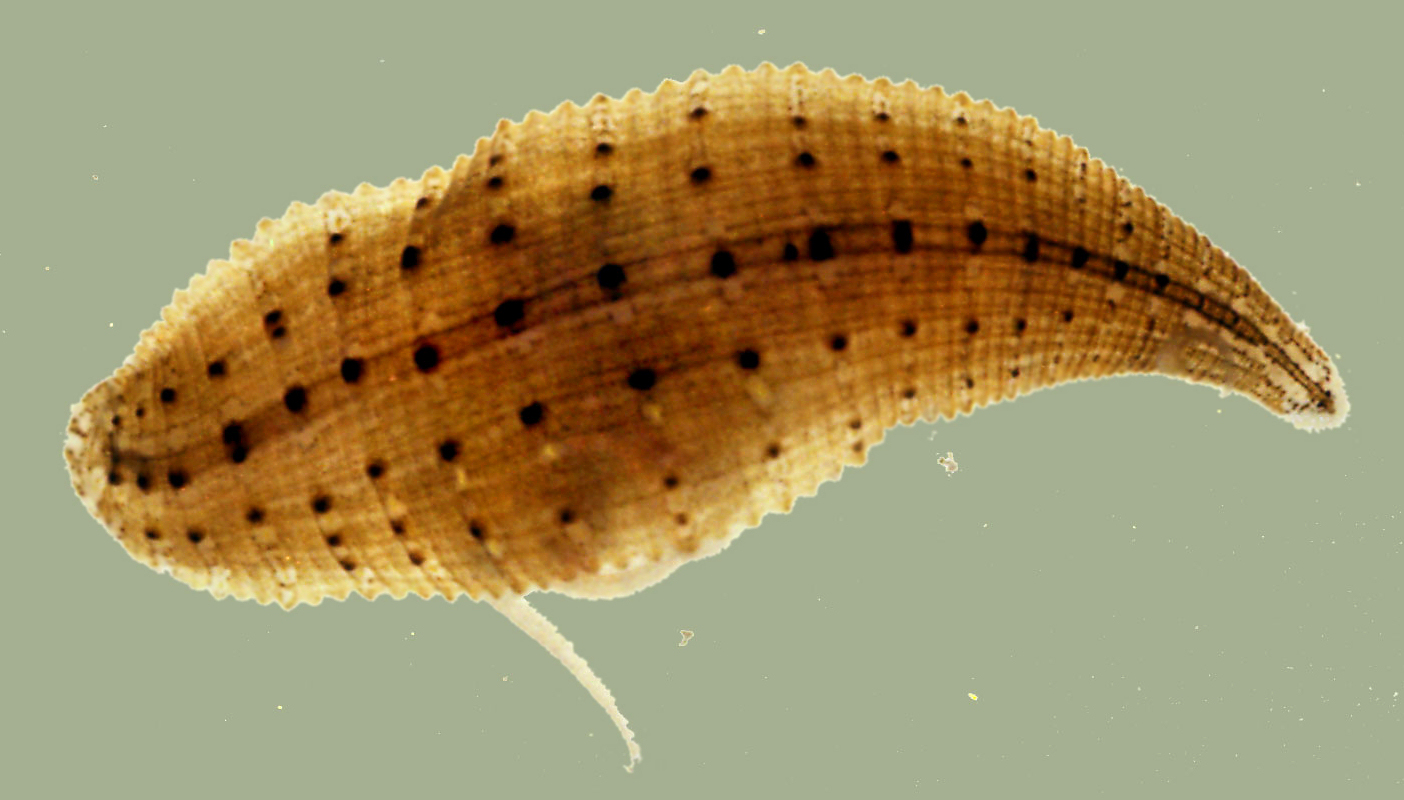
- Helobdella europaea

Scientific classification
- Kingdom: Animalia
- Phylum: Annelida
- Clade: Pleistoannelida
- Clade: Sedentaria
- Class: Clitellata
- Subclass: Hirudinea
- Order: Rhynchobdellida
- Family: Glossiphoniidae
- Genus: Helobdella; Blanchard, 1896

Species
- See text

= Helobdella =

Genus of annelid worms

Helobdella is a genus of leeches in the family Glossiphoniidae, the freshwater jawless leeches. They occur worldwide.

These are small, flat leeches which do not feed on blood.

Several species in this genus are used as model organisms in the study of developmental biology.

It has been difficult to define species in this genus without DNA analysis. Like other leeches in this family, some Helobdella species are polymorphic, coming in different colors and patterns. On the other hand, some uniformly colored species are actually cryptic species complexes that may be divided into separate species with genetic analysis.

As of 2004 there were approximately 40 described species, with species being described and reclassified continually.

Species include:

- Helobdella austinensis
- Helobdella californica
- Helobdella chaquensis
- Helobdella cordobensis
- Helobdella cryptica
- Helobdella duplicata
- Helobdella elongata
- Helobdella europaea
- Helobdella longicollis
- Helobdella malvinensis
- Helobdella michaelseni
- Helobdella modesta
- Helobdella paranensis
- Helobdella pichipanan
- Helobdella obscura
- Helobdella robusta
- Helobdella similis
- Helobdella stagnalis
- Helobdella triserialis
- Helobdella virginiae
- Helobdella wodzickiorum
- Helobdella xenoica
