= Abbotts Lagoon =

Lake in California, United States

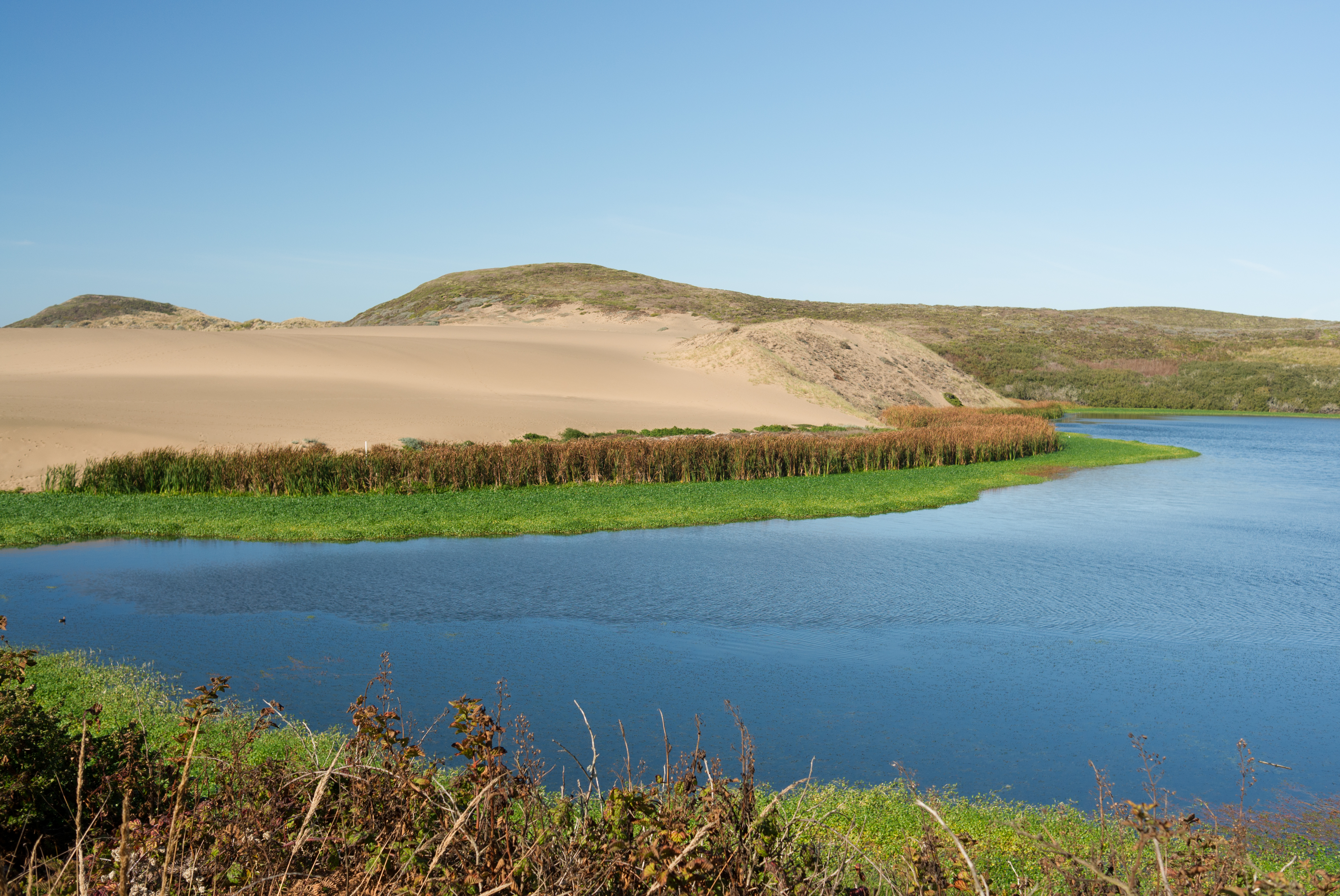

- Location within California Location within the United States
- Location: Marin County, California
- Coordinates: 38°7′3″N 122°57′12″W
- Type: lagoon
- Primary outflows: Pacific Ocean
- Basin countries: United States
- Surface elevation: 8 feet (2.4 m)

Abbotts Lagoon is a lagoon on the northwestern coast of the Point Reyes National Seashore, southwest of Tomales Point, in California, United States. The inland portion of the lagoon receives freshwater runoff, but the lagoon may be brackish from occasional winter tidal exchange along its western edge. The eastern shore of the lagoon is covered with old growth northern coastal scrub including coyote bush, yellow bush lupine, sword fern and California blackberry.

== History ==
Coast Miwok lived in the area before 19th-century European colonization. The lagoon is named for the Abbott brothers, Carlisle S. Abbott and John Abbott. They were Canadians who came west during the California Gold Rush and eventually leased land on the Point Reyes peninsula in the mid-1800s—specifically operating dairy ranches on what became known as H Ranch and I Ranch, which surround the lagoon. The Abbott brothers took turns serving as justices of the peace for Tomales Township (John in 1859–1860 and Carlisle from 1860–1861). Carlisle Abbott later moved south to the Salinas Valley, where he became a prominent land developer, state assemblyman, and founder of the town of Salinas. The Abbotts early leasehold on Point Reyes left their name on the lagoon. Abbotts Lagoon was variously identified as Abbott's Lagoon Bombing Target, Abbott's Lagoon Target Area, Abbott's Lagoon Bombing Range, and Bombing Range Number Two while used as a dive bomber practice area by pilots from Alameda Naval Air Station and Santa Rosa outlying field from 1941 to 1952. The lagoon was designated part of Point Reyes National Seashore in 1962.

== Geology ==
Abbotts Lagoon is usually separated from the Pacific Ocean by dune sand to the west. The eastern side of the lagoon is bordered by Miocene marine sediments to the north and Pliocene marine sediments to the south from sedimentary rock formations on the western side of the San Andreas Fault. Santa Margarita Sandstone atop the Monterey Formation forms a ridge along the southern side of the valley containing the lagoon inland of the pedestrian bridge, and is exposed along the eastern shoreline of the lagoon seaward of the pedestrian bridge.

The lagoon's main freshwater tributary is Abbotts Creek, which begins on Inverness Ridge just west of L Ranch Road and Pierce Point Road at elevation 368 feet (112 m) and flows 2.3 miles (3.7 km) west to Abbotts Lagoon.

== Ecology ==
A 1999 survey of the fish species in the upper, middle and lower sections of Abbott Lagoon found Sacramento perch (Archoplites interruptus), Pacific herring (Clupea pallasii), prickly sculpin (Cottus asper), silver surfperch (Hyperprosopon ellipticum), longfin smelt (Spirinchus thaleichthys), and three-spined stickleback (Gasterosteus aculeatus) and non-native largemouth bass (Micropterus nigricans) and striped bass((Morone saxatilis)). The sand spit separating Abbotts Lagoon from the Pacific Ocean can be eroded by high water levels in the lagoon from winter storms combined with large wave action in the ocean enabling estuarine and marine fish species to enter. The authors found the water deepest and most brackish in the lower lagoon and shallowest and freshest in the upper lagoon (the latter receiving Abbotts Creek, the lagoon's primary tributary).

A 2021–2022 study of the bacteria Escherichia coli (E. coli) levels in multiple Point Reyes waterbodies, including Abbotts Lagoon, found high levels up to many times the safe limits for swimming. These included Abbotts Creek where it crosses Pierce Point Road, although E. coli levels were lower. The bacteria was attributed to cattle manure run-off.

A 2012–2013 study of North American river otters (Lontra canadensis) found that the aquatic mammals had recolonized the San Francisco Bay area's coastal watersheds, including Abbotts Lagoon.

== Recreation ==
Walking trails provide access to observe the birds and wildflowers of the locally unique habitats surrounding Abbotts Lagoon. Brush rabbits, black-tailed jackrabbits, pocket gophers, muskrats, river otter and black-tailed deer may be seen around the lagoon. Coyote, bobcat, gray fox, long-tailed weasel, striped skunk, raccoon, badger, and cougar are rarely seen.

== Birding ==
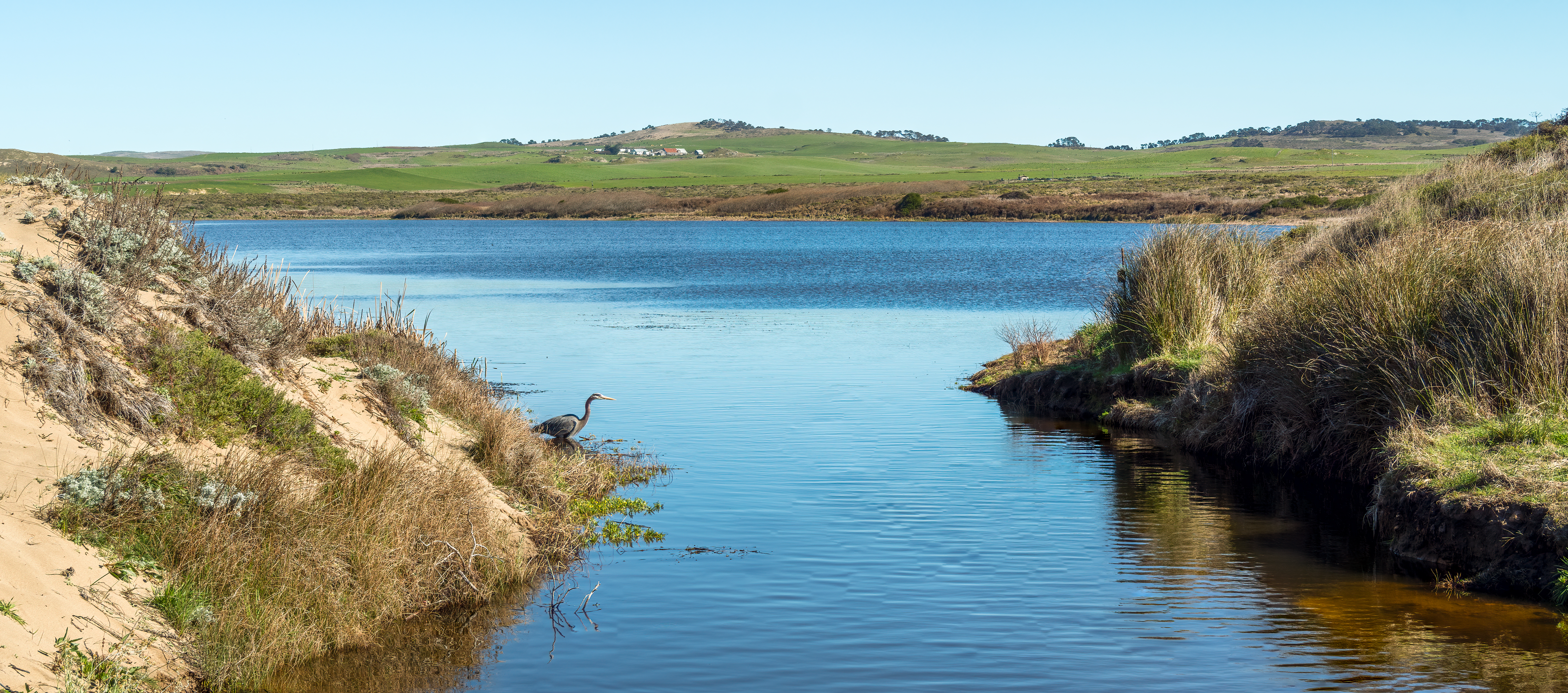
Great blue heron at Abbotts Lagoon

Bird species observed at Abbotts Lagoon include:

- Auks - common murre - pigeon guillemot
- Blackbirds - Brewer's blackbird - brown-headed cowbird - red-winged blackbird - tricolored blackbird
- Cormorants - Brandt's cormorant - double-crested cormorant - pelagic cormorant
- Ducks - American wigeon - bufflehead - cinnamon teal - common goldeneye - common merganser - gadwall - greater scaup - green-winged teal - lesser scaup - mallard - northern pintail - northern shoveler - red-breasted merganser - ring-necked duck - ruddy duck - surf scoter
- Eagles - golden eagle
- Falcons - merlin - peregrine falcon - prairie falcon
- Finches - American goldfinch - house finch
- Geese - black brant
- Grebes - black-necked grebe - Clark's grebe - horned grebe - pied-billed grebe - western grebe
- Gulls - California gull - common gull - glaucous-winged gull - Heermann's gull - herring gull - ring-billed gull - Thayer's gull - western gull
- Hawks - Cooper's hawk - ferruginous hawk - northern harrier - osprey - red-shouldered hawk - red-tailed hawk - rough-legged buzzard - sharp-shinned hawk - white-tailed kite
- Herons - American bittern - great blue heron - great egret - snowy egret
- Hummingbirds - Allen's hummingbird - Anna's hummingbird
- Larks - shore lark - western meadowlark
- Loons - black-throated loon - common loon - Pacific loon - red-throated loon
- Owls - barn owl - burrowing owl - short-eared owl
- Pelicans - brown pelican - great white pelican
- Phoebes - black phoebe - Say's phoebe
- Pipits - buff-bellied pipit
- Plovers - grey plover - western snowy plover - killdeer (The western snowy plover is considered "threatened" under the Endangered Species Act.)
- Quail
- Rails - American coot - Virginia rail
- Raven
- Sandpipers - greater yellowlegs - marbled godwit - sanderling - willet - Wilson's snipe
- Sparrows - fox sparrow - golden-crowned sparrow - grasshopper sparrow - Savannah sparrow - song sparrow - spotted towhee - white-crowned sparrow
- Swallows - barn swallow - cliff swallow - northern rough-winged swallow - tree swallow - violet-green swallow
- Swans - trumpeter swan - tundra swan
- Terns - Caspian tern - elegant tern
- Thrushes - western bluebird
- Vulture
- Warblers - common yellowthroat - ruby-crowned kinglet - yellow-rumped warbler
- Woodpeckers - northern flicker
- Wrens - Bewick's wren - marsh wren
- Wrentit

== Flora ==
Abbotts Lagoon is the location of the single remaining natural population of the endangered plant species Sonoma spineflower (Chorizanthe valida).

== See also ==
- List of lakes in the San Francisco Bay Area
- List of lakes in California
