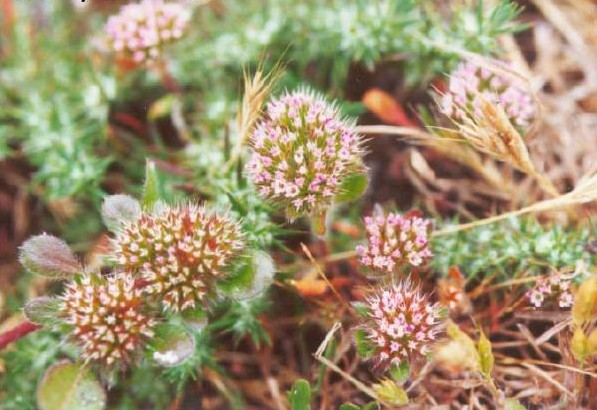

Conservation status
- Critically Imperiled (NatureServe)

Scientific classification
- Kingdom: Plantae
- Clade: Embryophytes
- Clade: Tracheophytes
- Clade: Angiosperms
- Clade: Eudicots
- Order: Caryophyllales
- Family: Polygonaceae
- Genus: Chorizanthe
- Species: C. valida

Binomial name
- Chorizanthe valida S.Wats.

= Chorizanthe valida =

Species of flowering plant

Chorizanthe valida is a rare species of flowering plant in the buckwheat family known by the common name Sonoma spineflower. It is endemic to West Marin, Marin County, California, where it is known from only one remaining natural population at Point Reyes National Seashore. It was thought to be extinct until 1980 when the Point Reyes population was discovered.

Chorizanthe valida is a federally listed endangered species.

This plant is erect in form, reaching up to about 30 centimeters tall. The inflorescence is a cluster of flowers with each flower surrounded by six reddish or gray bracts, each tipped with a straight awn. The awns are bright red when new and age ivory white. They are not hard or hooked in shape like those of many other Chorizanthe. The flower is a few millimeters long and white or pink in color.

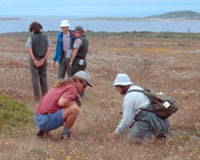
Staff and California Native Plant Society volunteers perform a survey for Sonoma spineflower.

This rare plant once had a wider distribution; specimens were collected many decades ago in neighboring Sonoma County. Today it is limited to Point Reyes where there is one natural population at Abbotts Lagoon and one that has been reintroduced by humans near Bull Point. The number of individuals is variable.

The local habitat is coastal prairie on deep, sandy soils. The soil, remnants of a Pleistocene dune system, can bear only drought-tolerant plants because it cannot retain much water.

Research suggests that areas with grazing cattle contain a larger number of plants than areas where animals are excluded, but the plants in the exclusion areas are larger and have more flowers. Cattle do not eat the rare plant and may in fact help clear the land of invasive non-native plants, such as velvetgrass (Holcus lanatus). The land around Abbotts Lagoon is a cattle pasture today.

This species occurs within the bounds of a protected National Seashore, so its habitat will not be developed, and it is protected from such activities as mining, dredging, and horseback riding activity. Threats that do remain include damage by hikers and off-road vehicles. The overall effects of cattle on the land are not certain; they may actually be a positive force in the life of the rare plant. The plant is limited to two relatively small populations, so any one severe event such as wildfire or drought could drive it to extinction.
