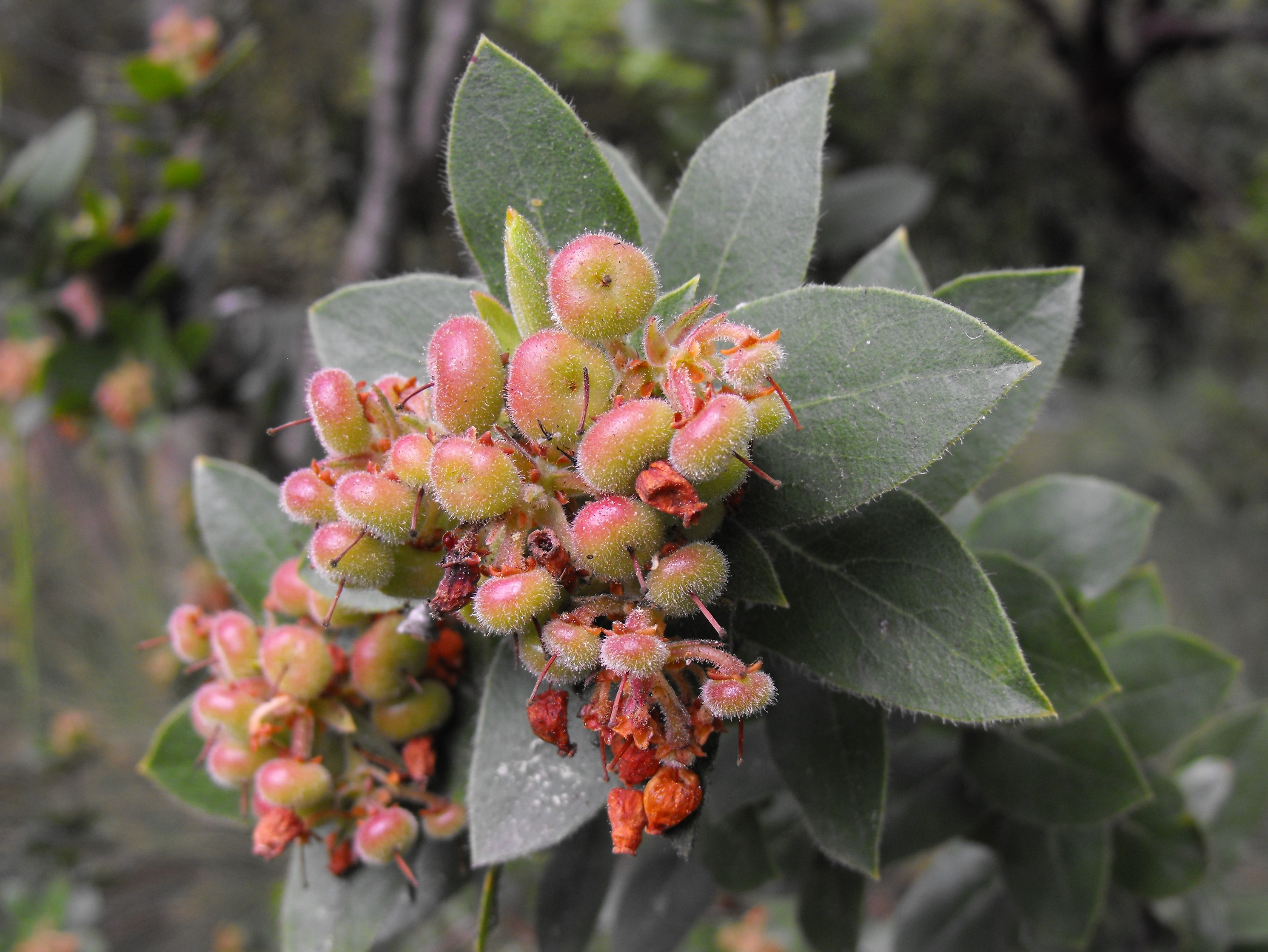

Conservation status
- Endangered (IUCN 3.1)

Scientific classification
- Kingdom: Plantae
- Clade: Tracheophytes
- Clade: Angiosperms
- Clade: Eudicots
- Clade: Asterids
- Order: Ericales
- Family: Ericaceae
- Genus: Arctostaphylos
- Species: A. montaraensis

Binomial name
- Arctostaphylos montaraensis J.B. Roof

Synonyms
- Arctostaphylos imbricata Eastw. Arctostaphylos imbricata Eastw. subsp. montaraensis (J.B. Roof) P.V. Wells

= Arctostaphylos montaraensis =

Species of flowering plant

Arctostaphylos montaraensis, known by the common name Montara manzanita, is a species of manzanita in the family Ericaceae.

== Distribution ==
This perennial evergreen shrub is endemic to California, native only to a few occurrences in northern San Mateo County on San Bruno Mountain and Montara Mountain, northern extensions of the Santa Cruz Mountains.

It is found at elevations of 80–500 metres (260–1,640 ft) on the two mountains, growing on decomposing granite and sandstone rock outcrops, in coastal chaparral and coastal sage scrub habitats.

The plant is ranked as a critically endangered species by the California Native Plant Society Inventory of Rare and Endangered Plants of California, due to being threatened by new developments and off trail/road walking and vehicle (e.g. motorcycles, mountain bikes) habitat degradation.

== Description ==
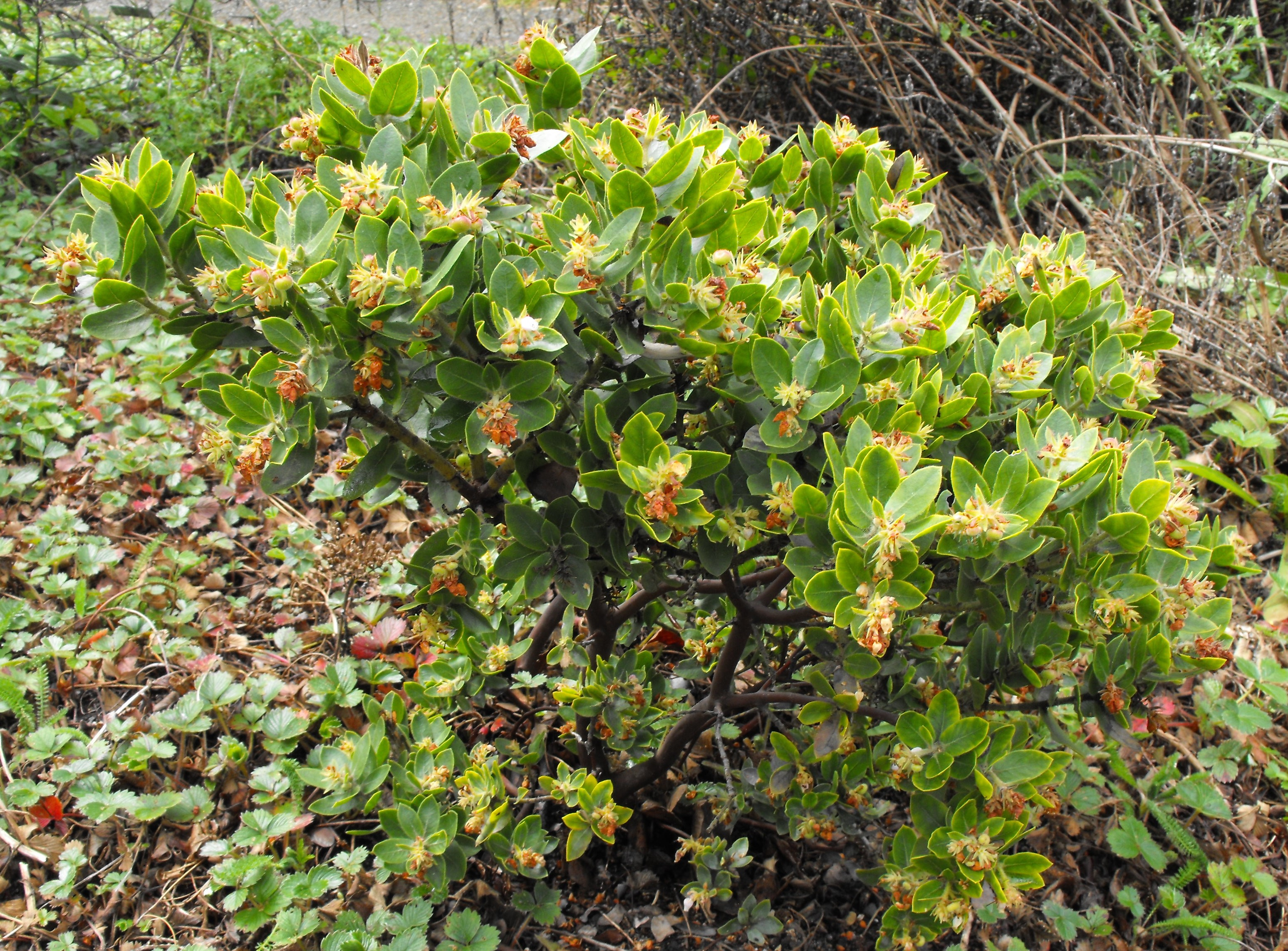
Arctostaphylos montaraensis, in the Berkeley University of California Botanical Garden California chaparral garden.

Arctostaphylos montaraensis is a mounding to erect shrub that can grow to heights from 0.5 metres (1.6 ft) (on exposed granite outcrops) to 5 metres (16 ft). The multiple trunks and stems have a deep reddish−brown bark. The twigs and nascent inflorescence axis are coated in glandular bristles. The shrub has a dense foliage of light gray−green glandular leaves, rough and dull in texture, and up to 4 or 5 centimeters long.

The inflorescence is a dense cluster of cone-shaped manzanita flowers, each white in color, and just under a centimeter long and with bristles inside. The flowering period is January through March.

The small "apple−like" (Spanish manzanita) red fruits are 6–7 millimetres (0.24–0.28 in) wide.

== Cultivation ==
Arctostaphylos montaraensis is cultivated as a chaparral landscaping plant, for California native plant, drought tolerant, and natural habitat gardens.

== See also ==
- California coastal sage and chaparral ecoregion
- Natural history of the California chaparral and woodlands
