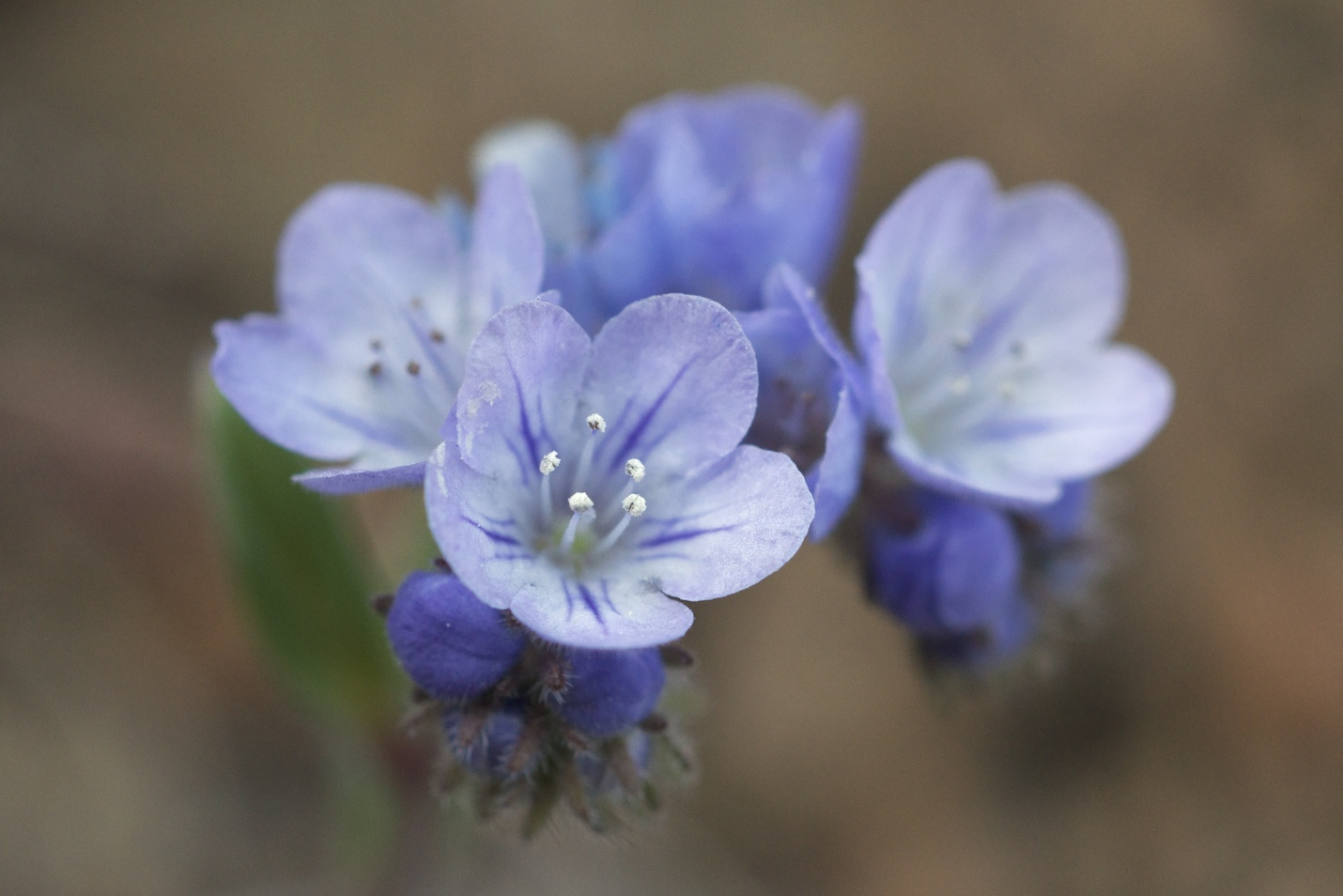

Scientific classification
- Kingdom: Plantae
- Clade: Tracheophytes
- Clade: Angiosperms
- Clade: Eudicots
- Clade: Asterids
- Order: Boraginales
- Family: Hydrophyllaceae
- Genus: Phacelia
- Species: P. breweri

Binomial name
- Phacelia breweri A.Gray

= Phacelia breweri =

Species of plant

Phacelia breweri is a species of phacelia known by the common name Brewer's phacelia.

== Distribution ==
The plant is endemic to northern California, in and south of the San Francisco Bay Area. It is native to the California Coast Ranges below 1,400 metres (4,600 ft), primarily in the Diablo Range and Gabilan Mountains. It is a member of the flora in chaparral and oak woodland habitats.

== Description ==
Phacelia breweri is a branching annual herb spreading or growing upright to a maximum height near 45 centimeters. It is glandular and coated in soft and coarse hairs. The lance-shaped or oval leaves are up to 4 centimeters long, the lower ones lobed.

The hairy inflorescence is a crowded, one-sided, curving or coiling cyme of many bell-shaped flowers. Each flower is about half a centimeter wide and light blue in color. The bloom period is March to June.
