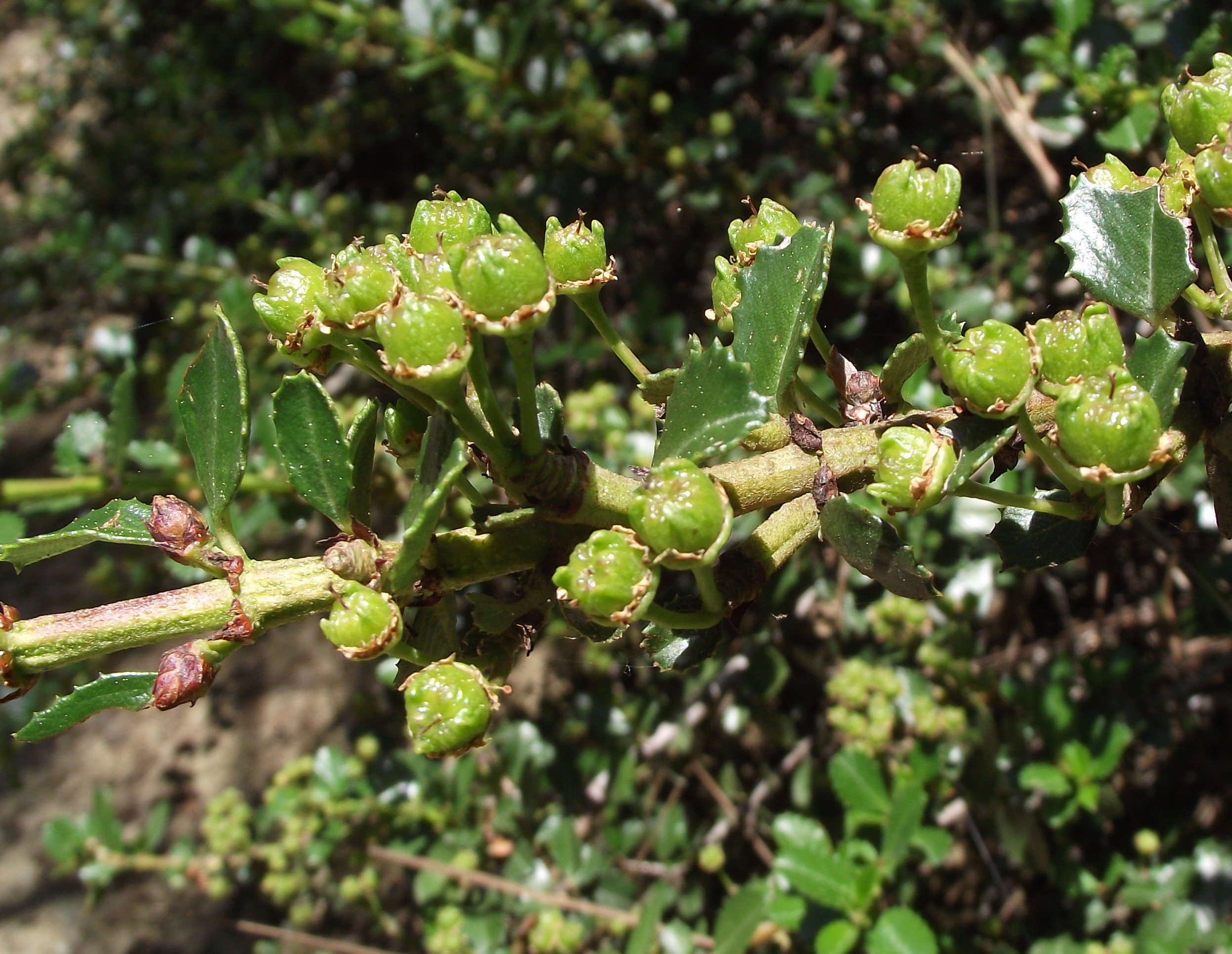
- Fruits

Conservation status
- Critically Imperiled (NatureServe)

Scientific classification
- Kingdom: Plantae
- Clade: Embryophytes
- Clade: Tracheophytes
- Clade: Spermatophytes
- Clade: Angiosperms
- Clade: Eudicots
- Clade: Rosids
- Order: Rosales
- Family: Rhamnaceae
- Genus: Ceanothus
- Species: C. masonii

Binomial name
- Ceanothus masonii McMinn

= Ceanothus masonii =

Mason's ceanothus

Species of flowering plant

Ceanothus masonii is a species of shrub in the buckthorn family, Rhamnaceae, known by the common name Mason's ceanothus. It is endemic to Marin County, California, where it is known only from an area near Bolinas on the Point Reyes National Seashore. It grows in the coastal chaparral on the windblown bluffs.

== Description ==
This rare shrub grows to heights approaching 2 meters. The evergreen leaves are oppositely arranged and less than 2 centimeters long. They are round to oval in shape and have tiny, sharp teeth along the edges, sometimes spine-tipped. The inflorescence is a small cluster of deep blue to purple flowers. The fruit is a capsule just a few millimeters wide, topped with minute horns. This ceanothus is closely related to Ceanothus gloriosus, and may in fact be a variety of that species.
