= Helobdella californica =

Scientific classification
- Kingdom: Animalia
- Phylum: Annelida
- Clade: Pleistoannelida
- Clade: Sedentaria
- Class: Clitellata
- Subclass: Hirudinea
- Order: Rhynchobdellida
- Family: Glossiphoniidae
- Genus: Helobdella
- Species: H. californica

Binomial name
- Helobdella californica Kutschera, 1988

Species of annelid

Helobdella californica is a leech of the family Glossiphoniidae. It is endemic to Golden Gate Park in San Francisco. While originally discovered on the shore of Blue Heron Lake (formerly Stow Lake), in 2026 the species was also observed in nearby Mallard Lake.
