= Helobdella robusta =

Scientific classification
- Domain: Eukaryota
- Kingdom: Animalia
- Phylum: Annelida
- Clade: Pleistoannelida
- Clade: Sedentaria
- Class: Clitellata
- Subclass: Hirudinea
- Order: Rhynchobdellida
- Family: Glossiphoniidae
- Genus: Helobdella
- Species: H. robusta

Binomial name
- Helobdella robusta Shankland, Bissen & Weisblat, 1992

Species of annelid

Helobdella robusta is a leech of the family Glossiphoniidae. Its genome has been sequenced by the Joint Genome Institute, and its early development has been studied extensively. Helobdella leeches called "H. robusta" in literature may not all be from the same species, though they are closely related. At least two species originally termed H. robusta are present at the same locality, the Sacramento River at the Sacramento Fairgrounds. Another closely related leech is now called Helobdella sp. (Austin).
