= Old Saint Hilary's Open Space Preserve =

Coordinates: 37°53′0″N 122°27′15″W

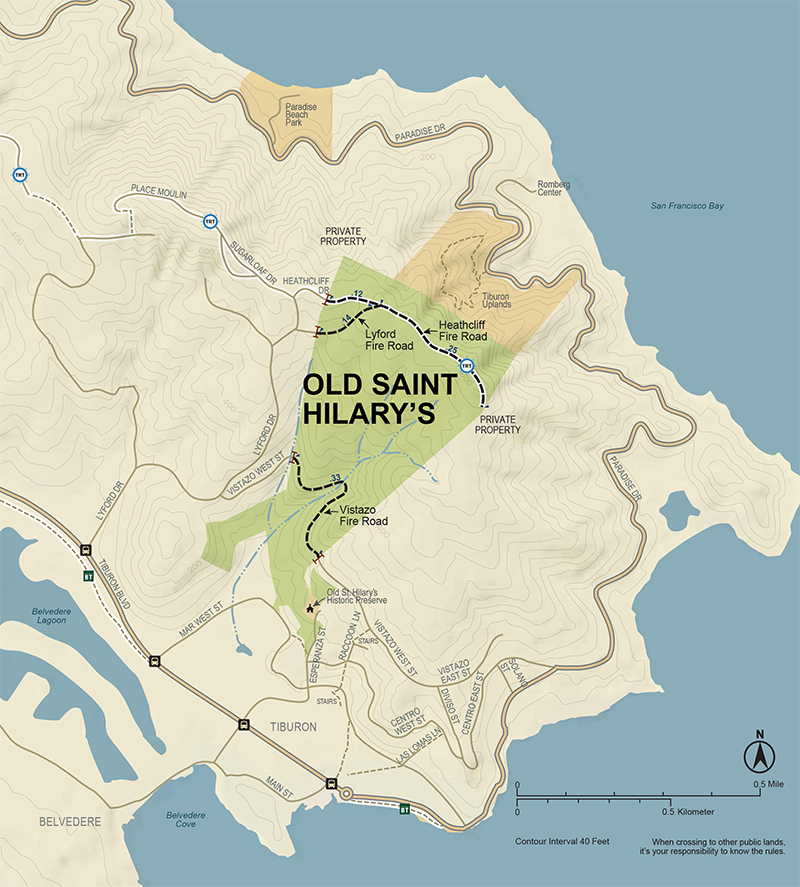
Map showing the area of Old Saint Hilary's Preserve

Old Saint Hilary's Open Space Preserve is a county park located in Marin County, California. It is 122 acres large and is connected to the Tiburon Uplands, which is 24 acres. The preserve was created by several local initiatives in the 90’s to save the land from development. It is a popular place for hikers because of its views and other features. There have been initiatives to expand the preserve, such as one that passed in 2022 that aims to connect it with undeveloped, but formerly privately owned land on its perimeter.

== Physical characteristics ==
The preserve and its nearby surroundings such as Ring Mountain contain faults, ophiolitic terrain, and rocks of the Franciscan Complex, such as mélange, chert, Serpentine-talc schist, Greenstone, and ultramafic rocks. The presence of Serpentine, which is the state rock of California, creates a unique soil composition and can be found in other parts of Marin. It is laden with heavy metals that are toxic to most plants.

== Biological characteristics ==
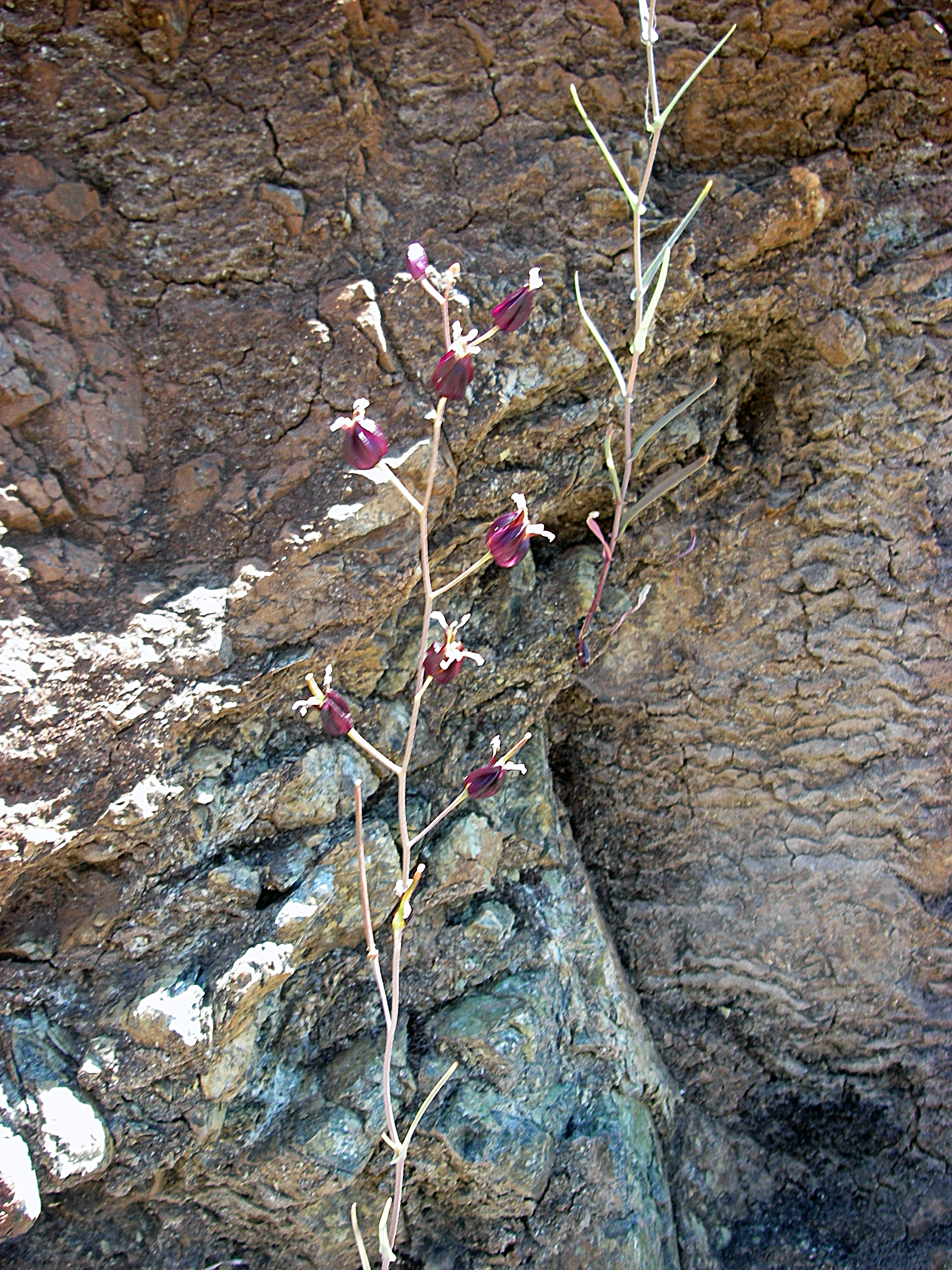
Tiburon Jewelflower found in Old Saint Hillary's Preserve

The peculiar geology and freshwater springs in the area provide a distinct ecosystem, giving rise to unique species. There are more than 200 species of plants growing on the preserve, and a grand majority of them are native to the peninsula. There is a wildflower preserve, named the John Thomas Howell Wildflower Preserve, next to the Old St. Hilary’s Church. Some of these flowers are extra noteworthy, such as the endangered Tiburon Jewelflower, to the extent that the Belvedere and Tiburon Landmarks Society chose it to be their logo.

According to a recent study, the Open Space land used to be continuous with nearby areas, all of which was the habitat of the Tiburon Jewelflower. However, housing developments in the latter half of the 20th century dissected the once uniform population into distinct groups. This is shown by a set of chronological overhead images compiled in the study. Also, gene samples which compare the current groups to the older one (saved in a seed bank) indicate an overall loss of genetic diversity. Another threat to its survival is drought worsened by climate change.

So, there are efforts to help the plant avoid extinction by transplanting it to nearby ring mountain, which has a similar geological profile. Although the plant never inhabited nearby ring mountain, it was identified as a “last hope” effort. However, it is still vulnerable to another hazard: hikers going off trail which "could destroy the new seedlings", despite signs posted by the Marin County Department of Parks and Open Space that prohibit this activity.

== Cultural characteristics ==
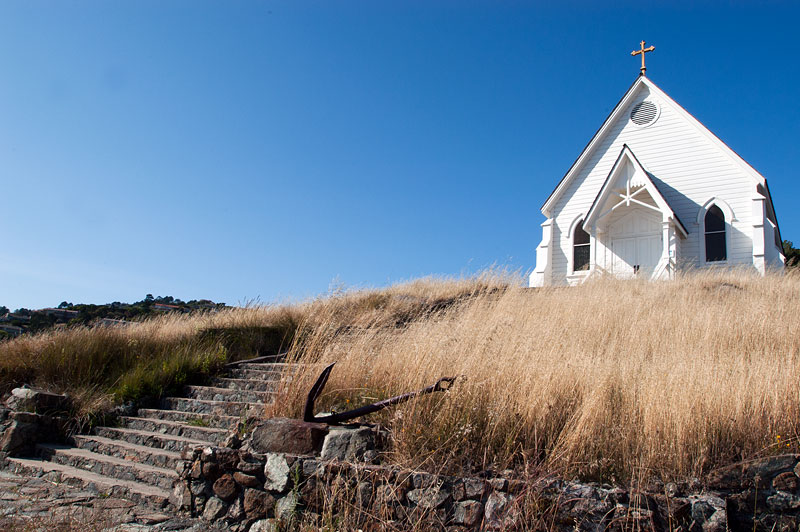
View of the Old Saint Hilary's Church

The preserve is the site of the Old St. Hilary's Church, which is its namesake. The church's architectural style is Carpenter Gothic. In the past, it was a branch of Mission San Rafael. The Tiburon and Belvedere Landmark Society have taken efforts to refurbish and decorate the inside. However, its function as an active Catholic church has been replaced by the new “St. Hilary’s Church”, hence the “Old” in its name.

As part of a public health measure in the 1930s, the Works Progress Administration constructed an outhouse for Old St. Hilary's Church. It remained in use until the 1940s, and now serves as a storage unit for the Church. It is the only surviving outhouse of its kind on the peninsula.

The Heritage & Arts Commission of the Tiburon town government designates it as a historic site and includes it in promotional materials, such as the Discover Tiburon brochure. Old St. Hilary's Church occasionally hosts small concerts and other events. It is also used for weddings and wedding photographs.
