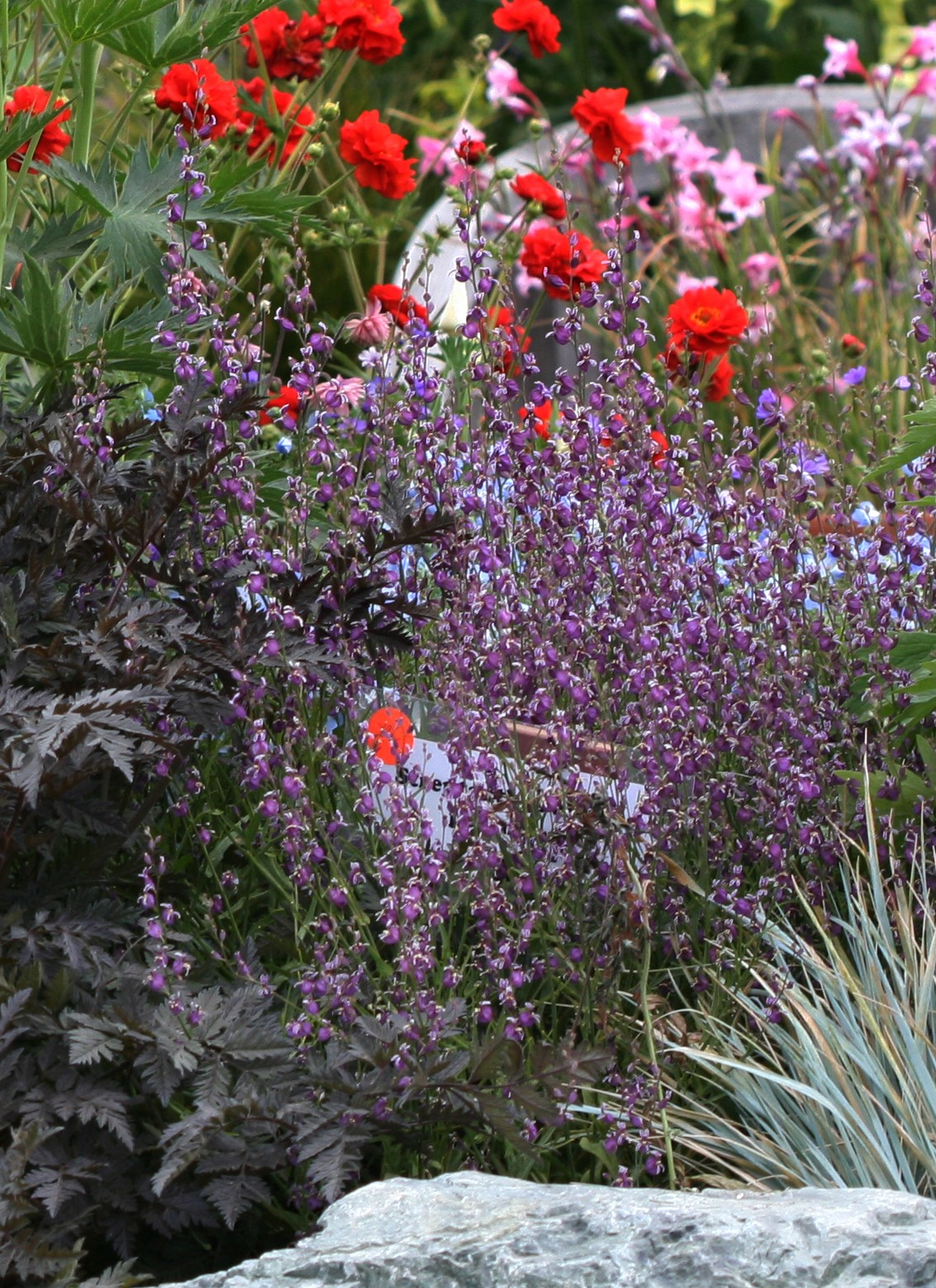

Conservation status
- Imperiled (NatureServe)

Scientific classification
- Kingdom: Plantae
- Clade: Tracheophytes
- Clade: Angiosperms
- Clade: Eudicots
- Clade: Rosids
- Order: Brassicales
- Family: Brassicaceae
- Genus: Streptanthus
- Species: S. glandulosus
- Subspecies: S. g. subsp. albidus

Trinomial name
- Streptanthus glandulosus subsp. albidus (Greene) Al-Shehbaz, M.S.Mayer & D.W.Taylor (2008)

Synonyms
- Euklisia albida (Greene) Greene (1904); Streptanthus albidus Greene (1887); Streptanthus glandulosus var. albidus (Greene) Jeps. (1925)

= Streptanthus glandulosus subsp. albidus =

Subspecies of flowering plant

Streptanthus glandulosus subsp. albidus is a subspecies of flowering plant in the mustard family known by the common name Metcalf Canyon jewelflower. It is endemic to California, where it is known only from the Central Coast Ranges in the San Francisco Bay Area. It grows in open areas such as grasslands, often on serpentine soils.

== Description ==
It is an annual and Biennial herb producing an upright, usually branching stem up to a meter tall or 3-12 decimeters. There are bristly hairs around the base. The basal leaves are lance-shaped with toothed edges and are borne on winged petioles. Leaves higher up the stem are smaller and narrower, sometimes linear in shape, and toothed or smooth-edged. Flowers occur at intervals along the upper stem. Each has a spherical to urn-shaped calyx of keeled sepals measuring 7-11mm, colored green-white to white or pale yellow, with purple or white curving petals that are 11-17mm long emerging from the tip. The calyx of sepals is white or green-tinged. The fruit is a long, narrow silique which may be 12 centimeters in length.

== Distribution ==
It is federally listed as an endangered species of the United States. It is endemic to Santa Clara County, where it is known from nine recent occurrences in the vicinity of Mount Hamilton.

It can be found in isolated and inaccessible mountains on a variety of soils like rock, gravel, and heavy clay.

=== Threats and conservation efforts ===
This flora is currently considered endangered according to the U.S. Fish and Wildlife Service. It was added to the United States Forest Service's watch list in 2003. There are a multitude of threats facing these plants. A lot of these plants are threatened by wind turbine facilities and off highway vehicle automotive usage. Vehicles damage the soil and disturb the ground environment. Another threat that is very common in California are frequent fires and those in the wrong season. There could also be the potential threat from cattle grazing or logging in the near future.

Observation in Santa Clara County, US-CA, US

This species grew on Tulare Hill, a 150-hectare serpentine outcrop west of Coyote Ridge, however the plant was eliminated due to overgrazing and development in the 1990s. In 2012 the Central Valley Project Conservation Program funded researchers from Santa Clara University and Creekside Science to reintroduce the flower on now protected land. Their team seeded 16,000 seeds of which only 17 seedlings and no reproductive plants appeared in spring 2014 due to extreme drought. In November 2014, they sowed 64,000 seeds and with the heavy rains more than 4,700 seedlings emerged. Cattle grazing is also needed on Tulare Hill to control annual grass growth fueled by nitrogen pollution from Silicon Valley but cattle eat the jewell flower so cattle were removed early may to avoid conflict with conservation needs. By 2020 the population of Metcalf Canyon Jewelflower expanded to more than 6,000 plants in six areas of Tulare Hill.
