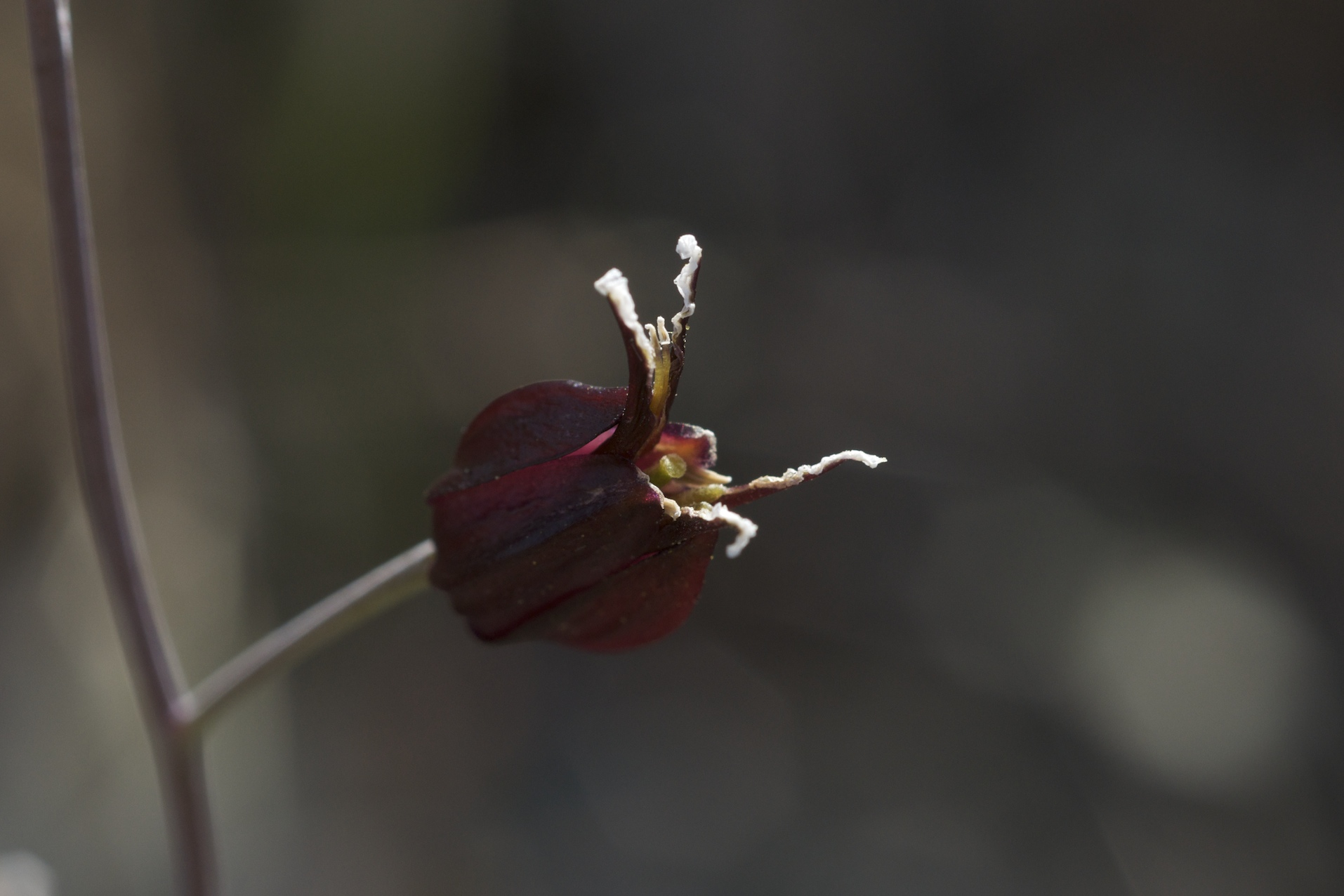
- Tiburon jewelflower

Conservation status
- Endangered (ESA)

Scientific classification
- Kingdom: Plantae
- Clade: Tracheophytes
- Clade: Angiosperms
- Clade: Eudicots
- Clade: Rosids
- Order: Brassicales
- Family: Brassicaceae
- Genus: Streptanthus
- Species: S. glandulosus
- Subspecies: S. g. subsp. niger

Trinomial name
- Streptanthus glandulosus subsp. niger (Greene) Al-Shehbaz, M.S.Mayer & D.W.Taylor (2008)

Synonyms
- Euklisia nigra (Greene) Greene (1904); Streptanthus glandulosus var. niger (Greene) Munz (1958); Streptanthus niger Greene (1886)

= Streptanthus glandulosus subsp. niger =

Species of herb

Streptanthus glandulosus subsp. niger is an endangered subspecies of flowering plant within the family Brassicaceae. Like other genus members, this herb has wavy petal margins with perimeter calluses that discourage larval herbivory. This plant is endemic to the Tiburon Peninsula of Northern California, and occurs at elevations below 150 m on serpentine grasslands. The common name for this subspecies is Tiburon jewelflower or black jewelflower. This annual herb blooms in May and June and displays dark purple sepals. The etymology of this genus scientific name derives from the Greek word streptanthus, meaning twisted flower, with reference to the notable wavy margins of the petals. The subspecies name niger relates to the color of the seeds being black, although an alternate account cites the dark color of the petals as the source of the appellation.

== Description ==
Streptanthus glandulosus subsp. niger is an annual herb attaining a height of 20 to 70 centimeters. The plant architecture may manifest as simple-stemmed or branching in the upper part. Lower portions of the stems are smooth and practically hairless. This self-pollinated plant has dark purple, almost black, flower petals; moreover, the petals have a purple claw and a white blade with a purple midvein. The zig-zag inflorescence pattern is an identifying characteristic; furthermore, the flower is almost closed at its throat. Sepals measure five to seven mm. The characteristic wavy petal margins have calluses that inhibit larval herbivory. The leaves of S. g. niger appear in a basal manifestation and measure less than nine centimeters in length; leaves are generally oblanceolate in shape, and may appear as coarsely dentate or short-lobed. Chromosomal characterization is 2n=28. This plant is also known for belonging to the mustard family and producing black mustard seeds.

== Taxonomy ==
This is a subspecies of the bristly jewelflower (Streptanthus glandulosus).

== Distribution and habitat ==
There are only two known colonies of Tiburon jewelflower, both of which occur on the Tiburon Peninsula, with a separation of about three km. One of the populations is in the vicinity of the historic Old Saint Hilary's Church. The Federal Register listing document noted that S. niger occurs only on grasslands above shallow serpentine soils involving gentle to moderate southwestern facing slopes. The listing statement further notes that: "Serpentine soils are derived from ultramafic rocks such as serpentinite, dunite, and peridotite, which are found in discontinuous outcrops in the...Coast Ranges". According to the Sacramento Fish and Wildlife Service: "species such as Tiburon jewelflower have adapted to serpentine soils and require them to survive".

== Conservation ==
The Tiburon jewelflower was first collected by Edward L. Greene in 1886 at the site of Old Saint Hilary's Church on the Tiburon Peninsula. Streptanthus niger was designated as endangered by the state of California in the year 1990 and listed by the U.S. federal government five years later. By 1998 a Species Recovery Plan had been prepared to provide more specific protection measures for this endangered dicotyledon. For each of the two known colonies, the population has varied between 25 and 2000 over recent years, indicating the precariousness of the species. An assistant professor from Mills College, with financial support from the Marin Country Open Space District, is carrying out a three year research project on conservation of the species. The California Native Plant Society has placed S. niger on List 1B (rare or endangered throughout its range).
