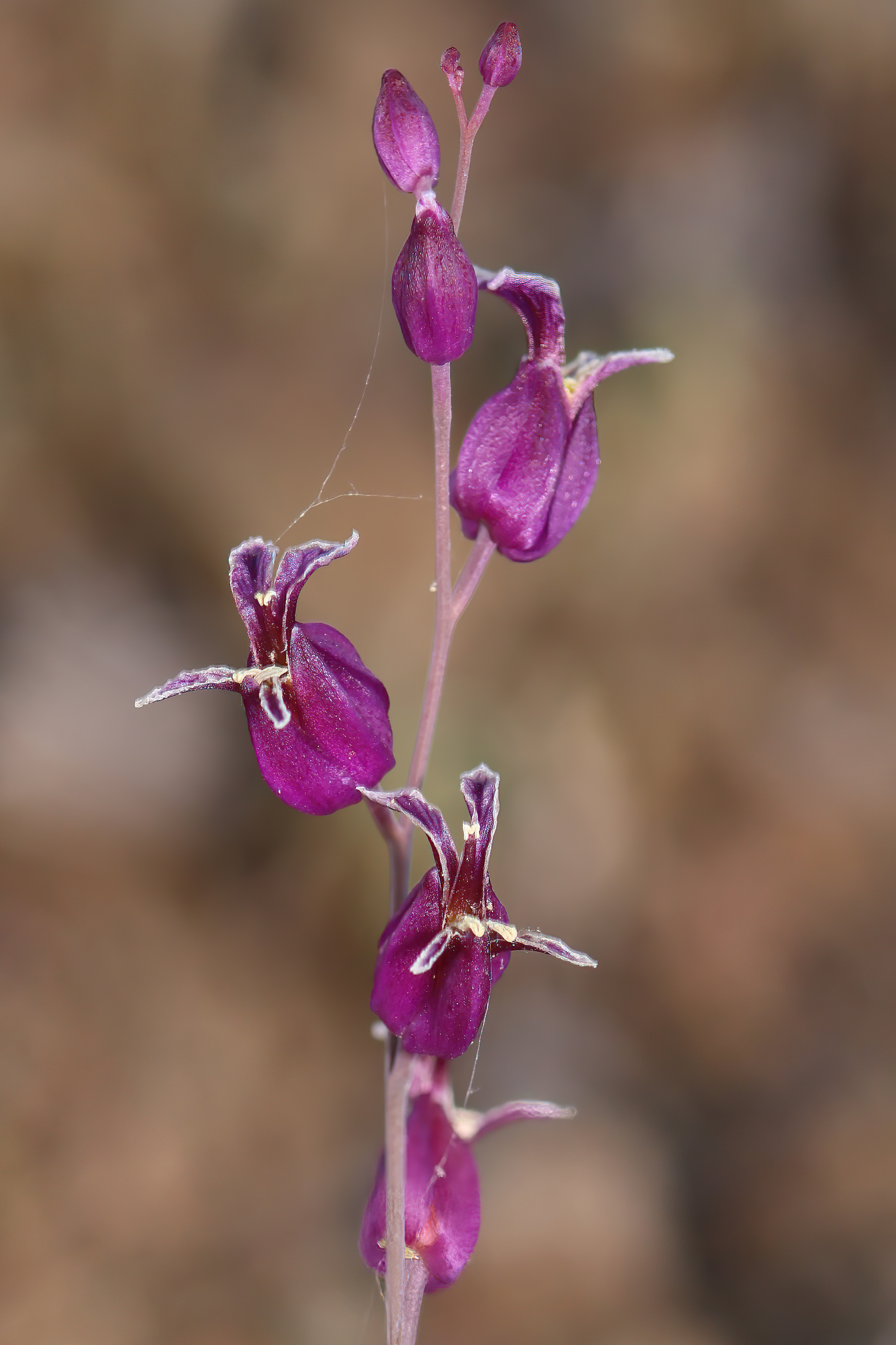
- Streptanthus glandulosus subsp. glandulosus

Scientific classification
- Kingdom: Plantae
- Clade: Embryophytes
- Clade: Tracheophytes
- Clade: Spermatophytes
- Clade: Angiosperms
- Clade: Eudicots
- Clade: Rosids
- Order: Brassicales
- Family: Brassicaceae
- Genus: Streptanthus
- Species: S. glandulosus

Binomial name
- Streptanthus glandulosus Hook. (1836)

Subspecies and varieties
- Ten; see text

Synonyms
- Erysimum glandulosum (Hook.) Kuntze (1891); Euklisia glandulosa (Hook.) Greene (1904)

= Streptanthus glandulosus =

Species of flowering plant

Streptanthus glandulosus is a species of flowering plant in the mustard family known by the common name bristly jewelflower. It is native to California and southwestern Oregon, where it grows in many types of habitat, including grassland, chaparral, and woodlands. Genetic and other analyses indicate that it is a species complex with ten subspecies which evolved as populations were isolated from each other. The complex includes subspecies previously considered separate species, such as the rare Tiburon jewelflower (ssp. niger) endemic to the San Francisco Bay Area. Plants in the complex are variable. In general they are annual herbs growing 10 centimeters to over a meter in height. They may be hairless hairy to bristly. The ephemeral basal leaves have blades borne on winged petioles. Leaves higher on the stem are linear to lance-shaped and clasp the stem at their bases. Flowers occur at intervals along the upper stem. Each flower has an urn-shaped calyx of sepals one-half to over one centimeter long which can be almost any color from white to yellowish to pink or purple to nearly black. Purple, white, or purple-veined white petals emerge from the tip. The fruit is a straight or curving silique up to 11 centimeters long.

== Subdivisions ==
Ten subspecies and varieties are accepted:

- Streptanthus glandulosus subsp. albidus (Greene) Al-Shehbaz, M.S.Mayer & D.W.Taylor
- Streptanthus glandulosus subsp. arkii M.S.Mayer
- Streptanthus glandulosus subsp. glandulosus
- Streptanthus glandulosus var. hoffmanii Kruckeb. – endemic to The Cedars in Sonoma County, California
- Streptanthus glandulosus subsp. josephinensis Al-Shehbaz & M.S.Mayer
- Streptanthus glandulosus subsp. niger (Greene) Al-Shehbaz, M.S.Mayer & D.W.Taylor
- Streptanthus glandulosus subsp. pulchellus (Greene) Kruckeb.
- Streptanthus glandulosus subsp. raichei M.S.Mayer
- Streptanthus glandulosus subsp. secundus (Greene) Kruckeb.
- Streptanthus glandulosus subsp. sonomensis (Kruckeb.) M.S.Mayer & D.W.Taylor
