= Neoendemism =

Neoendemism is one of two sub-categories of endemism, the ecological state of a species being unique to a defined geographic location. Specifically, neoendemic species are those that have recently arisen, through divergence and reproductive isolation or through hybridization and polyploidy in plants. Paleoendemism, the other sub-category, refers to species that were formerly widespread but are now restricted to a smaller area.

== Examples ==
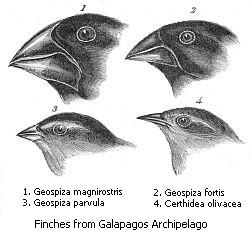
Four of the 14 finch species found on the Galápagos Archipelago

"Darwin's finches", residents of the Galápagos Islands, have been used since the 19th century as an example of how the descendants of one ancestor can evolve through adaptive radiation into several species as they adapt to different conditions on various islands. Charles Darwin wrote:

...one might really fancy that from an original paucity of birds in this archipelago, one species had been taken and modified for different ends."

The Galápagos archipelago is also the home of paleoendemic species.

The Santa Cruz cypress (Hesperocyparis abramsiana; formerly classified as Cupressus abramsiana) has a geographic range limited to a small section in the Monterey Bay region of California where subsea canyon topography reliably produces summer fog, owing to cold water upwelling. The U.S. Fish and Wildlife Service listed the species as endangered in 1987, due to increasing threats from habitat loss and disruption of natural forest fire regimes. In 2016, the conservation status of the Santa Cruz cypress was reduced to threatened. The cited reasoning was a decrease in threats against their habitat. However, a lengthy section of the 2016 federal report titled "Genetic introgression" (also known as introgressive hybridization) explains how the integrity of this species is also threatened by nearby horticultural plantings of a sister species, Monterey cypress, whose historically native range is nearby: on the opposite side of Monterey Bay. Hybridization is known to occur between the two endemics — as well as with a widely planted sister species native to Arizona: Arizona cypress. The ease of hybridization of cypress species in the American southwest has fostered a parallel history of taxonomic disagreements of where genus and species distinctions should apply. It thus provides a case study of neoendemism in conifers. As well, it illustrates an element of ongoing human impact — wind-dispersed pollen contamination from horticultural plantings — that cannot easily be corrected to meet conservation goals.

== See also ==
- Speciation
