= Old Saint Hilary's Church =

Historic church in California, United States

- St. Hilary's Mission Church
- U.S. National Register of Historic Places
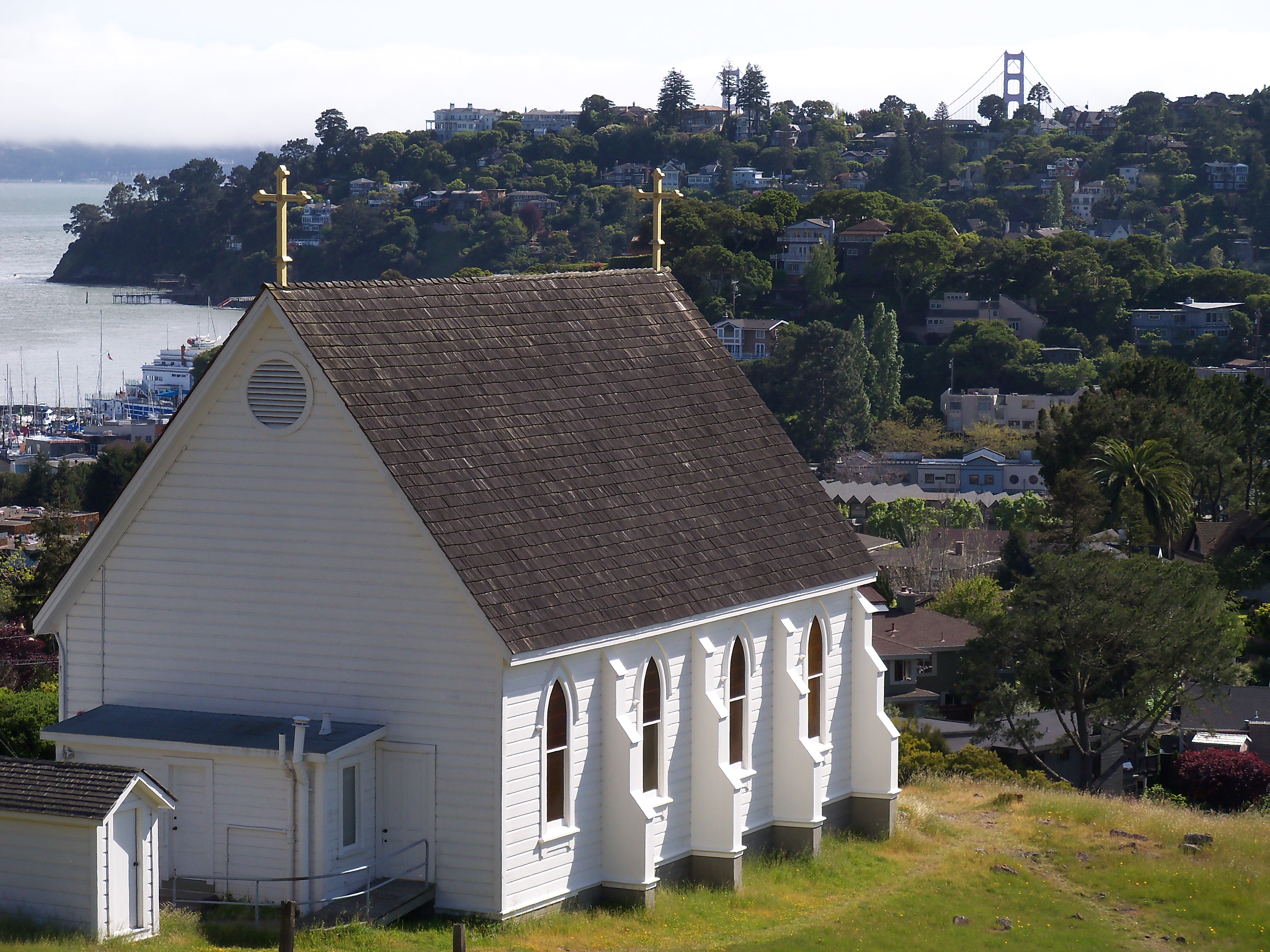
- View from the Old St. Hilary Church overlooking the San Francisco Bay

- Location within California
- Location: 201 Esperanza St. Tiburon, California
- Coordinates: 37°52′42″N 122°27′22″W
- Built: 1888
- Architectural style: Carpenter Gothic
- NRHP reference No.: 100004935
- Added to NRHP: February 3, 2020

Old St. Hilary's Landmark is a former mission church place of worship and now a historic landmark owned and maintained by the Belvedere-Tiburon Landmarks Society, Tiburon Peninsula, Marin County, California, United States. The landmark is situated on the flank of the Tiburon Hills, an area characterized by serpentine soils and hence has a distinct plant community. The area surrounding the church is a Marin County protected area, the Old Saint Hilary's Open Space Preserve. The church building was listed on the National Register of Historic Places in 2020.

An endangered wildflower species, Streptanthus niger, commonly called the Tiburon jewelflower, grows near the church.

== Sources ==
- Belvedere-Tiburon Landmarks Society
- Marin County Parks
