= Paleoendemism =

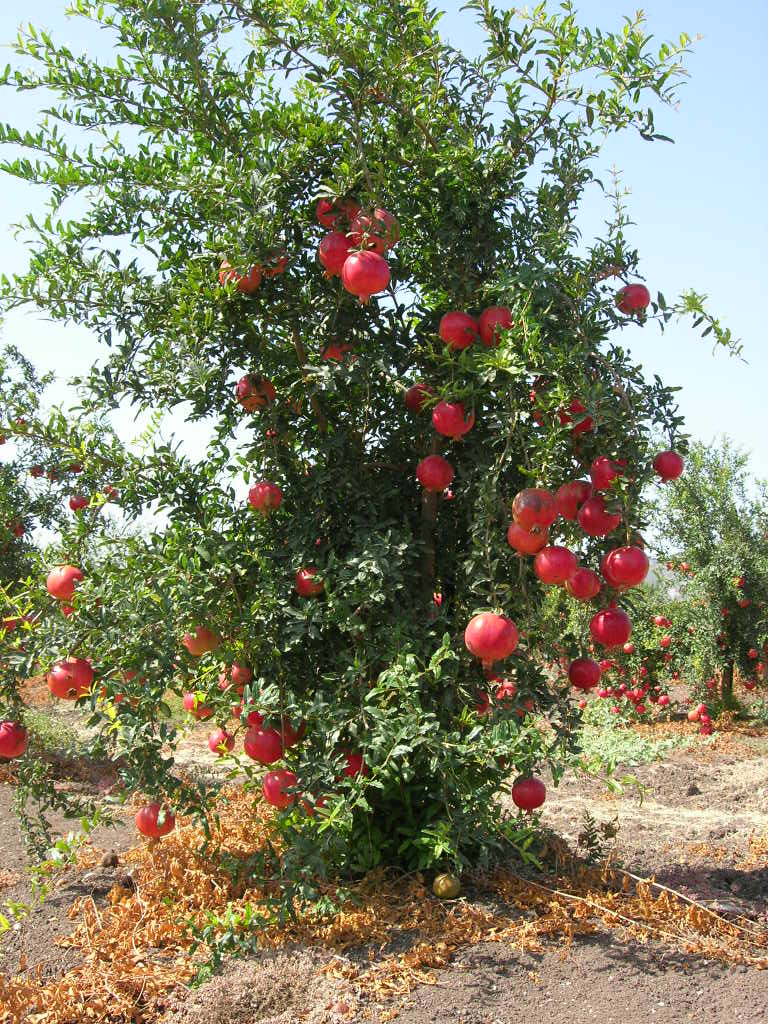
Pomegranate Fruit Tree (Punica)

Paleoendemism along with neoendemism is a possible subcategory of endemism. Paleoendemism refers to species that were formerly widespread but are now restricted to a smaller area. Neoendemism refers to species that have recently arisen, such as through divergence and reproductive isolation or through hybridization and polyploidy in plants.

== Etymology ==
The first part of the word, paleo, comes from the Greek word palaiós, meaning "ancient". The second part of the word, endemism is from Neo-Latin endēmicus, from Greek ενδήμος, endēmos, "native". Endēmos is formed of en meaning "in", and dēmos meaning "the people".

== Causes ==
Changes in climate are thought to be the driving force in creating paleoendemic species, generally due to habitat loss. Regions where the climate has remained relatively stable form refugia which are more likely to be endemic hotspots today. This applies to both neoendemism and paleoendemism. However, paleoendemism differs as it does not require additional factors such as barriers and ecological opportunities as it does not rely on adaptive radiation like neoendemism does. It instead relies on the instability of other regions' climate, which may limit the range of a species to a more stable region, thus turning that species paleoendemic. Limited ability for dispersal is also important in the creation of endemic species. The two terms can essentially be defined as "cradles" of new species (neoendemism), or "museums" of old species (paleoendemism).

=== Paleoendemism on islands ===
Islands as harbors for endemic species are explained by the theory of island biogeography. However, in order to be considered a paleoendemic on an island, the species must have had a widespread distribution previously, thus eliminating newly formed islands as potential refuges of paleo-endemics.

== Examples ==
It is not always clear whether a particular species is paleoendemic or neoendemic.

=== Algae ===
Golden algae

- Spiny golden algae (Mallomonas sp.)

=== Plants ===
- Gymnosperms
  - Fraser's fir (Abies frasieri)
  - Florida torreya (Torreya taxifolia)
  - Florida yew (Taxus floridana)
  - Ginkgo (Ginkgo biloba), the only surviving species of an ancient division of plants. from the Mesozoic to the mid-Cenozoic, these trees could be found throughout the world. However, today, only a single species survives, where it can only be found in China in the wild.
- Angiosperms
  - Box huckleberry (Gaylussacia brachycera)
  - Franklin tree (Franklinia alatahama)
  - Island oak (Quercus tomentella), fossil evidence from the late Tertiary shows how it was once widespread in mainland California, though now it is restricted to several islands in the Channel Islands, as well as Guadalupe Island.
  - Kentucky coffeetree (Gymnocladus dioicus)
- Pteridophytes
  - Appalachian bristle fern (Vandenboschia boschiana)

== Gallery ==
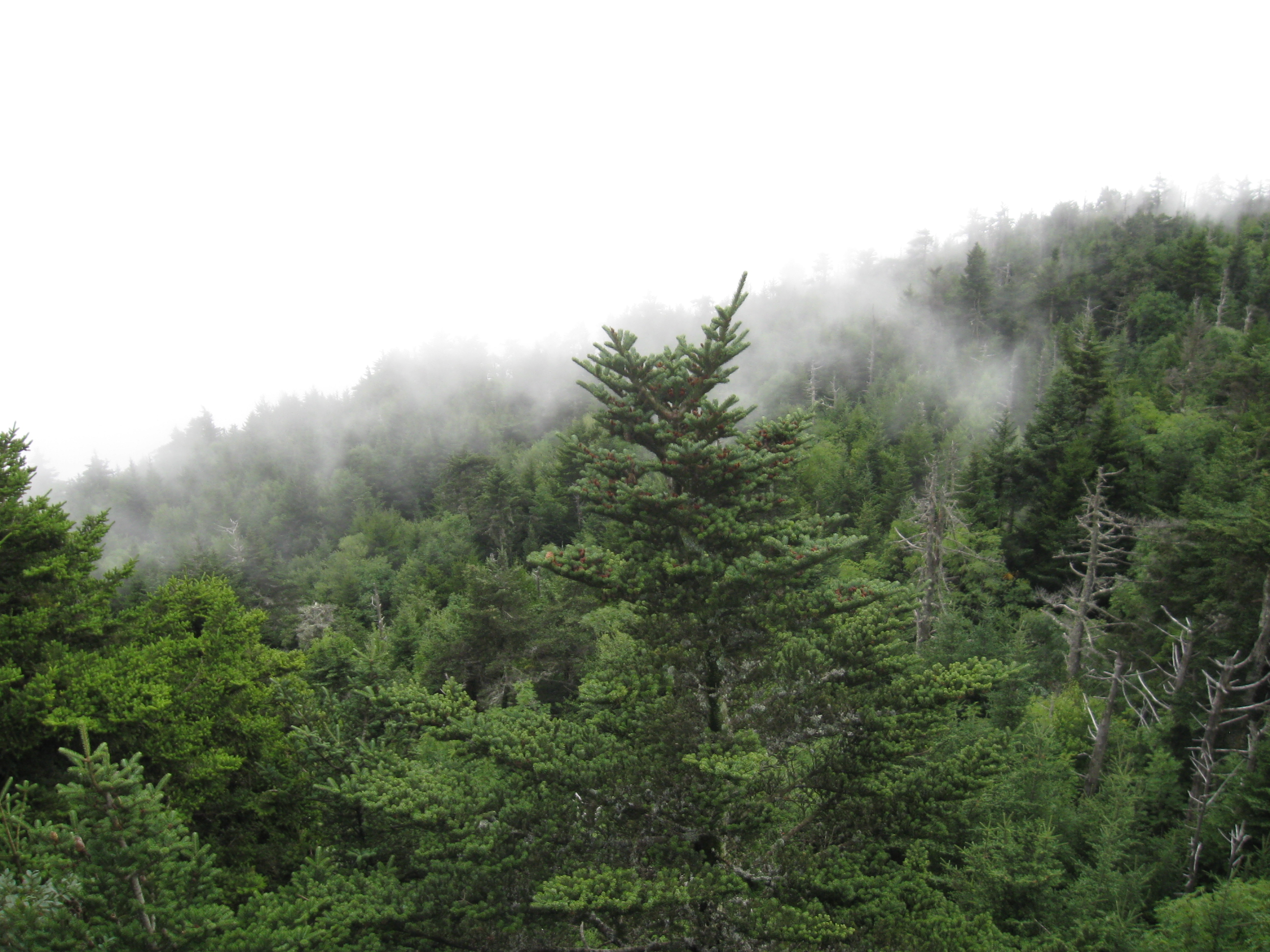
Fraser’s fir (Abies fraseri)

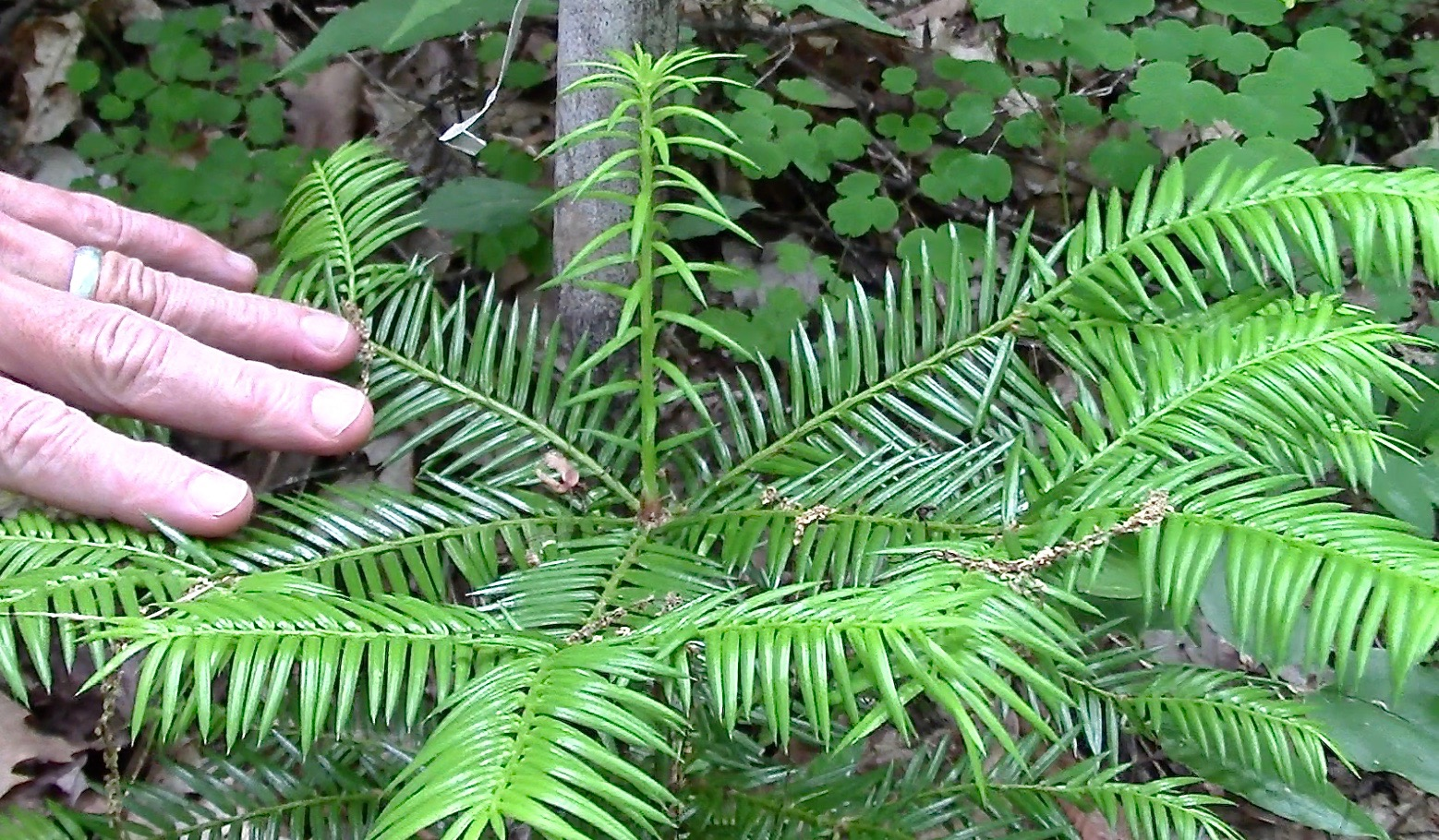
Gopherwood (Torreya taxifolia)

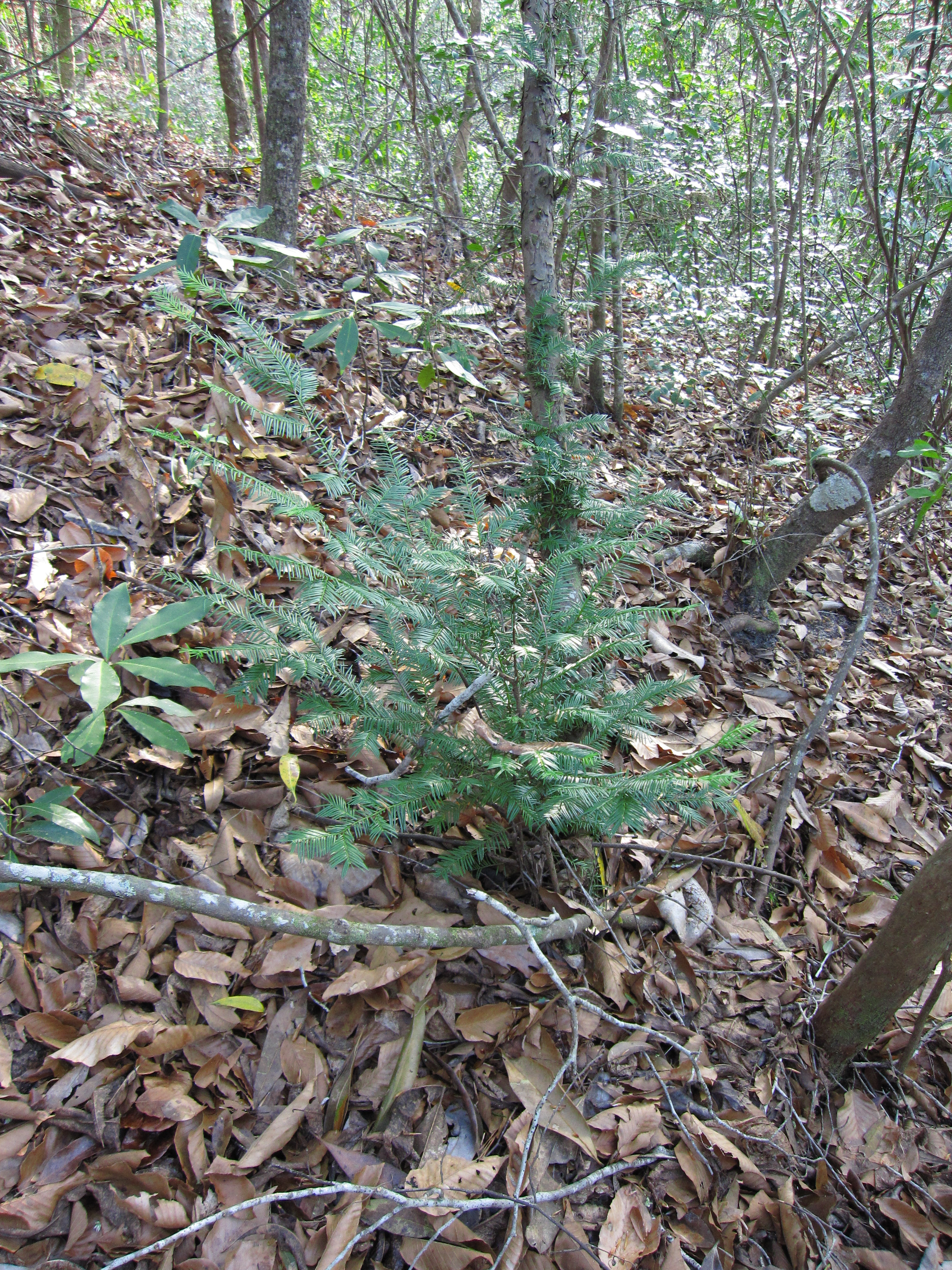
Florida yew (Taxus floridana)

Ginkgo (Ginkgo biloba)

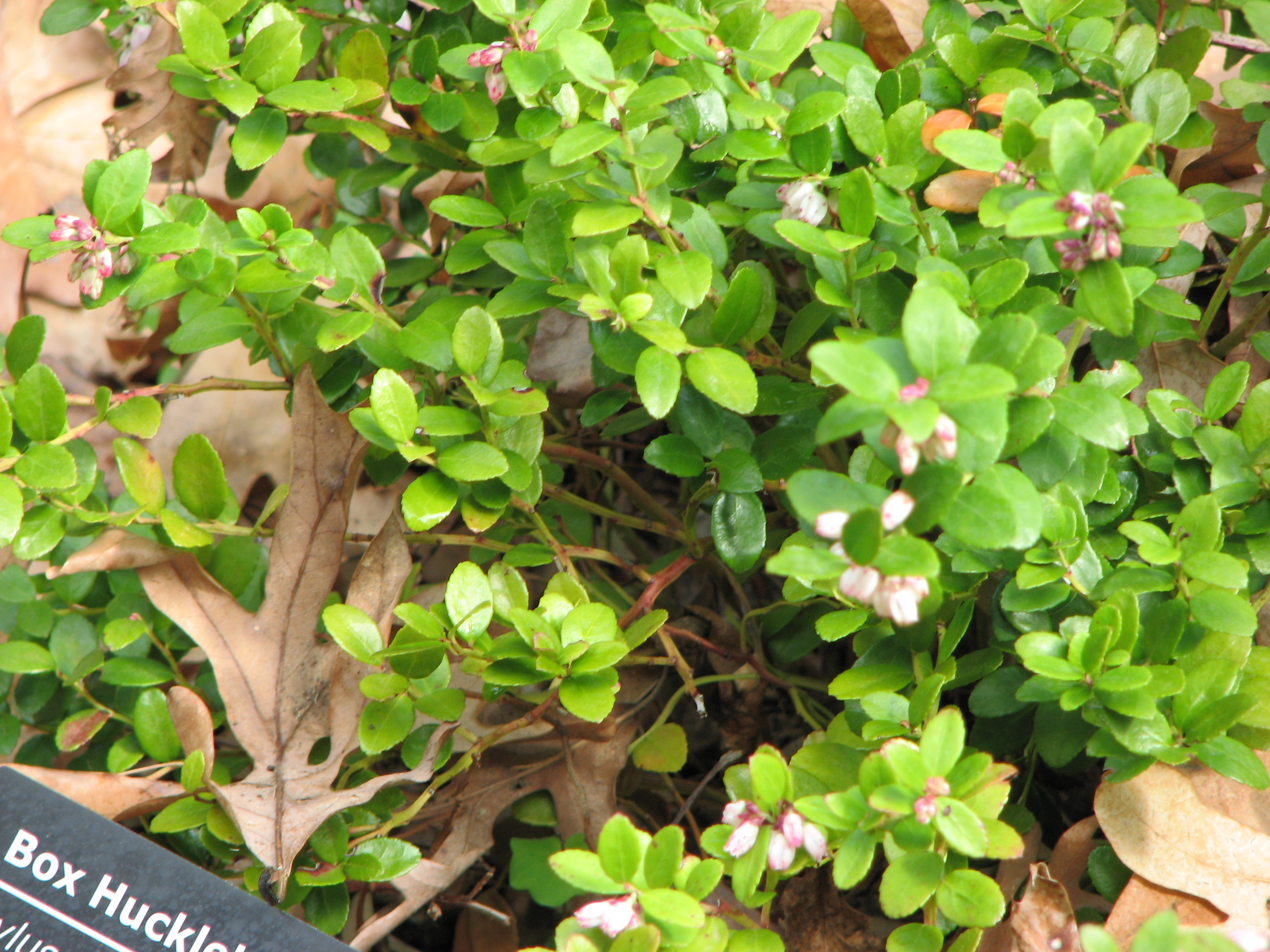
Box huckleberry (Gaylussacia brachycera)

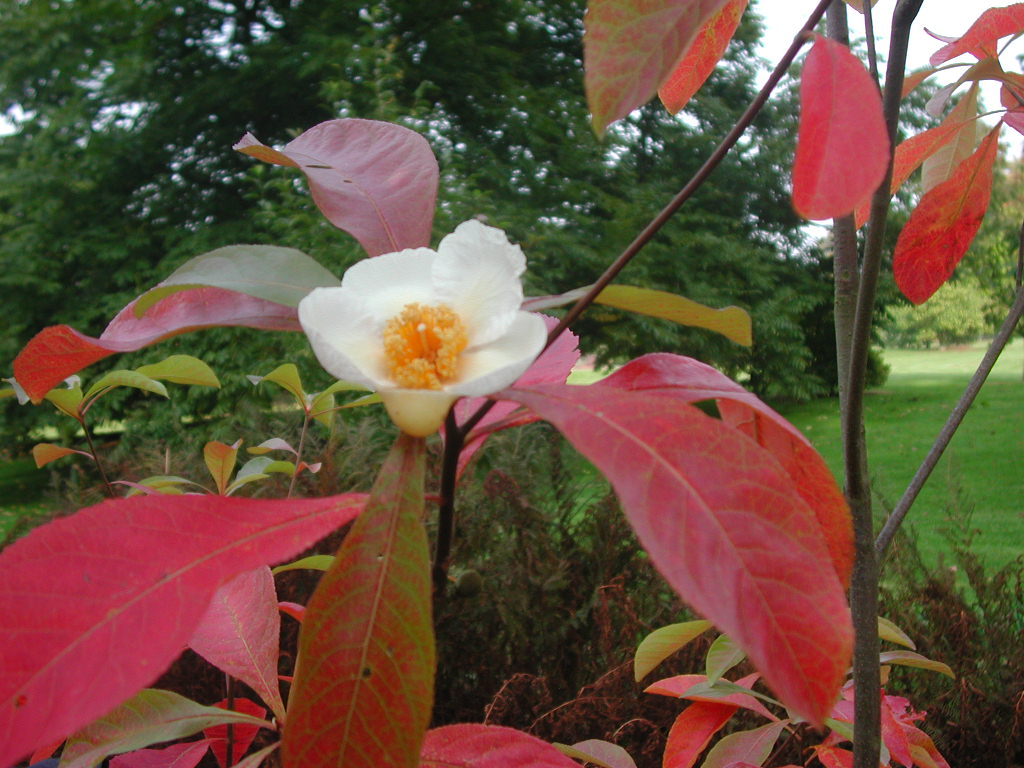
Alamataha tree (Franklinia alamataha)

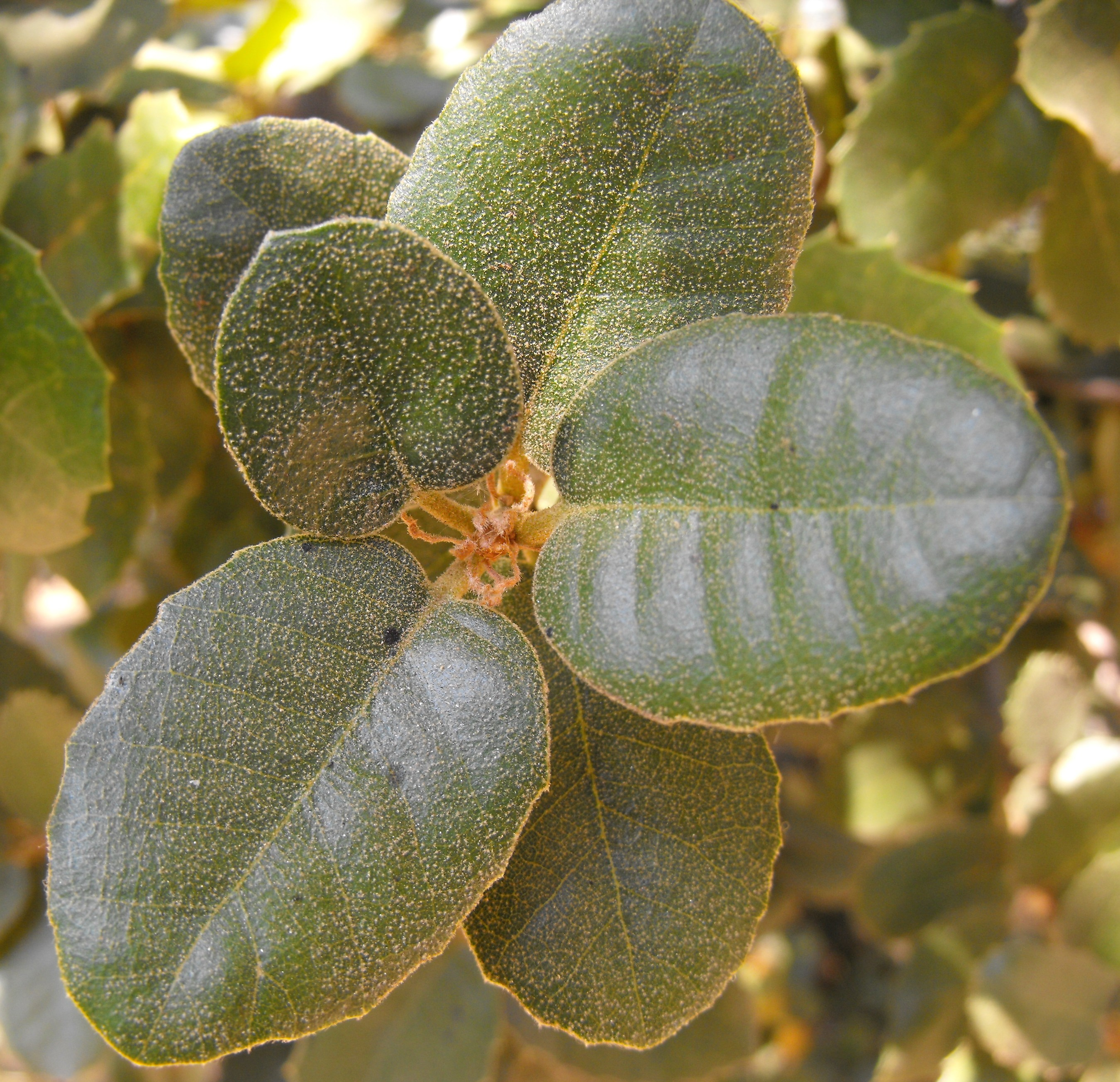
Island oak (Quercus tomentella)

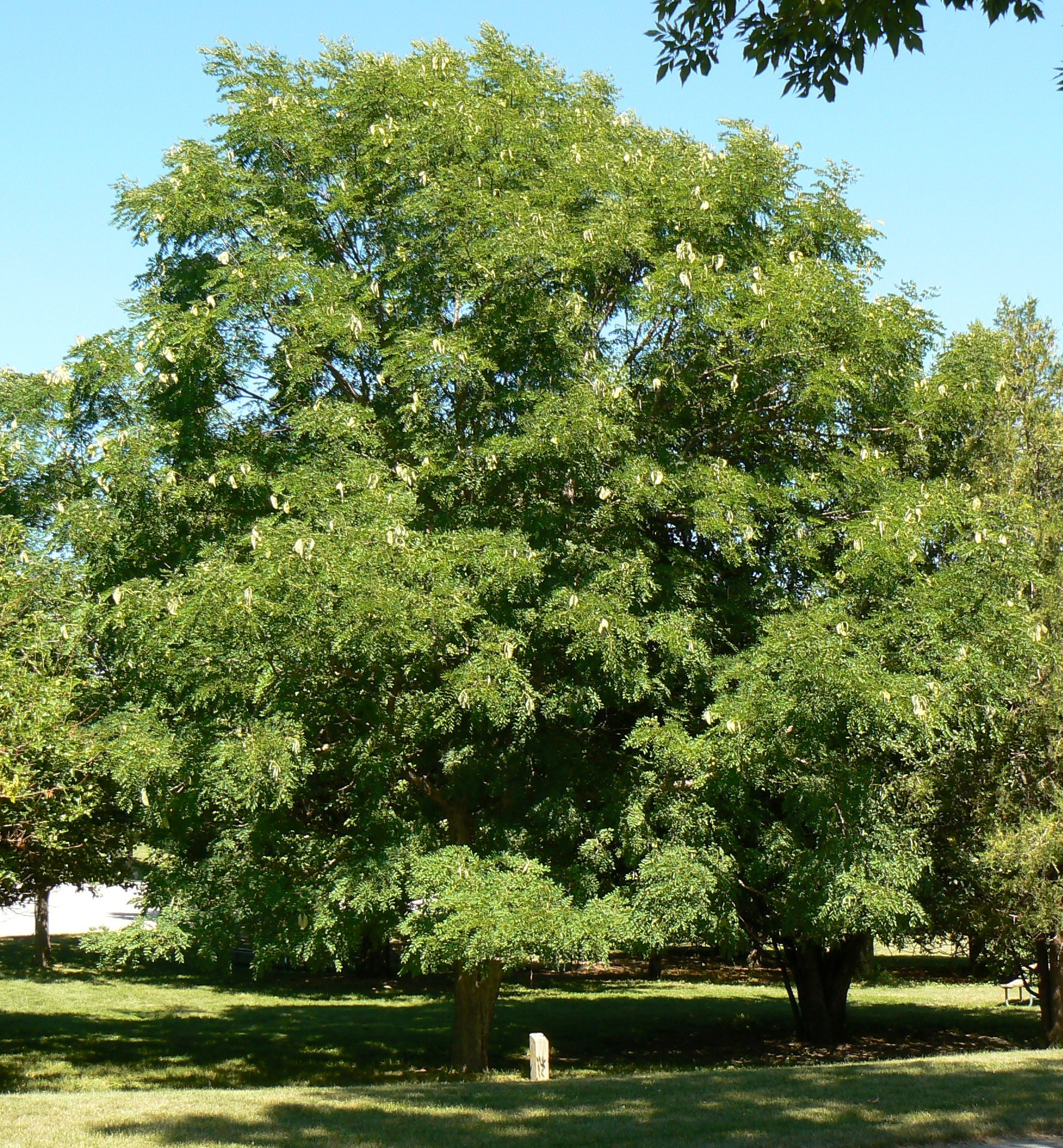
Kentucky coffeetree (Gymnocladus dioicus)

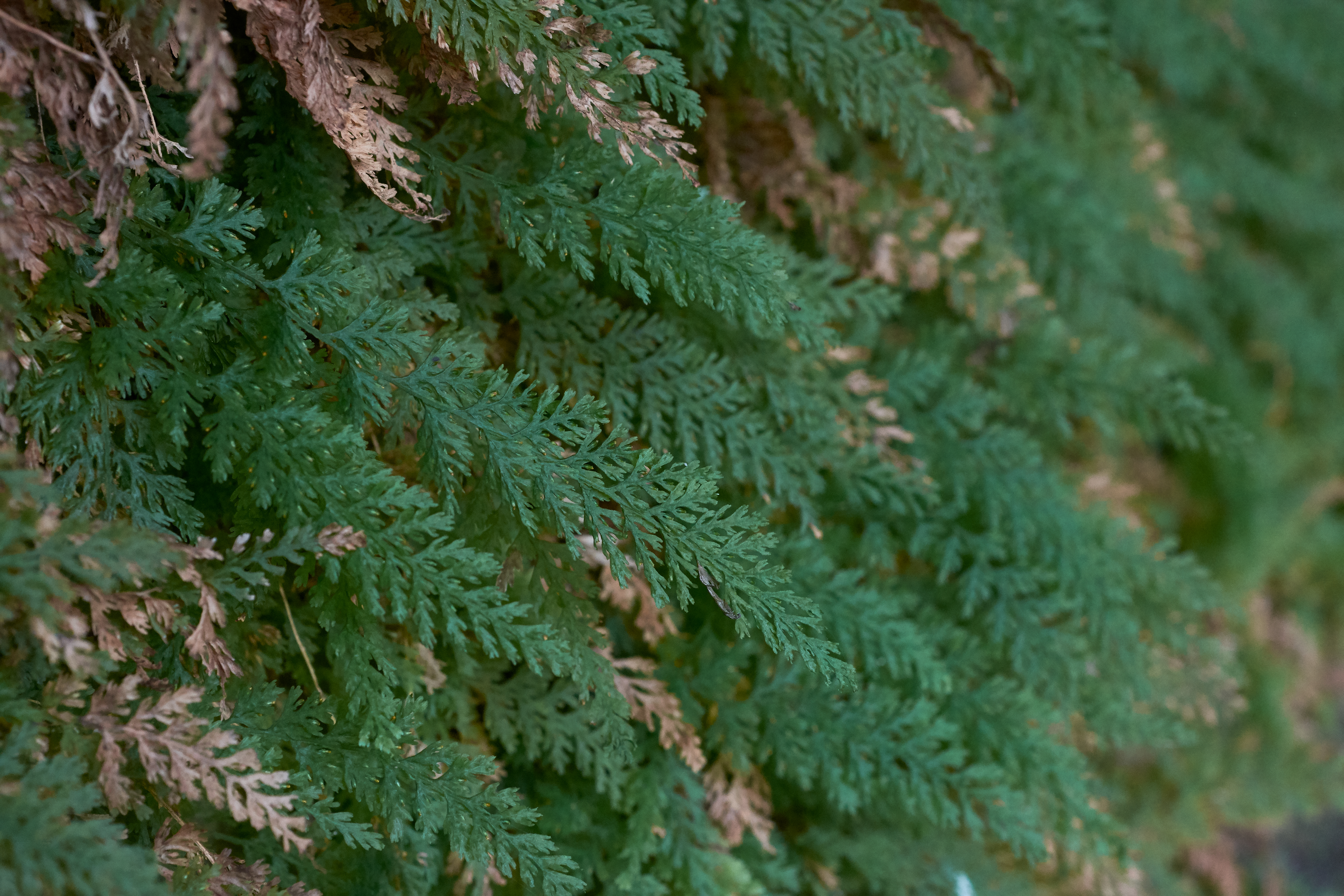
Appalachian filmyfern (Vandenboschia boschiana)

== See also ==
- Relict
