= Endemism =

State of species being unique to a location

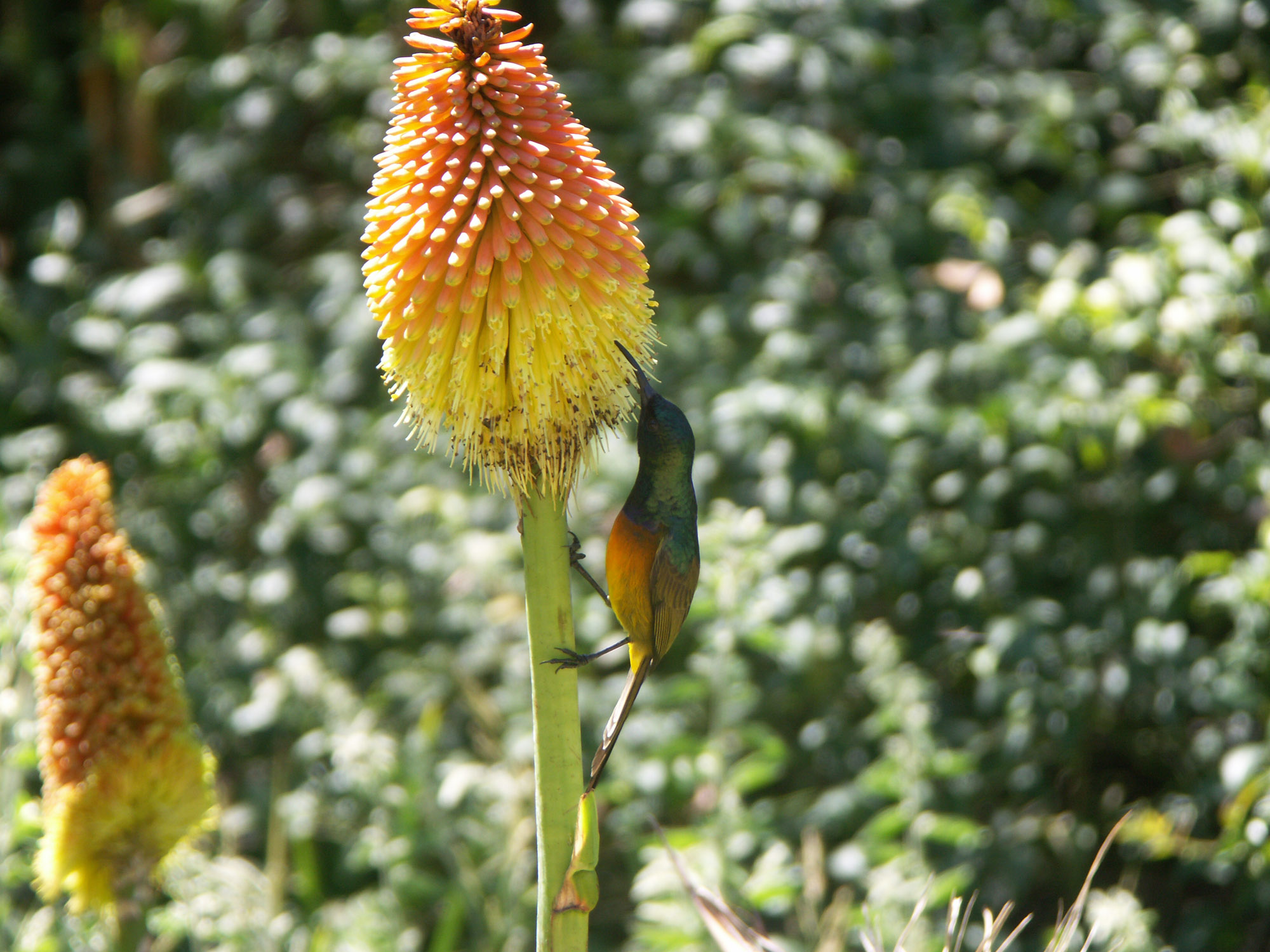
Both the orange-breasted sunbird (Anthobaphes violacea) and the Kniphofia uvaria plant it feeds on are found exclusively in South Africa.

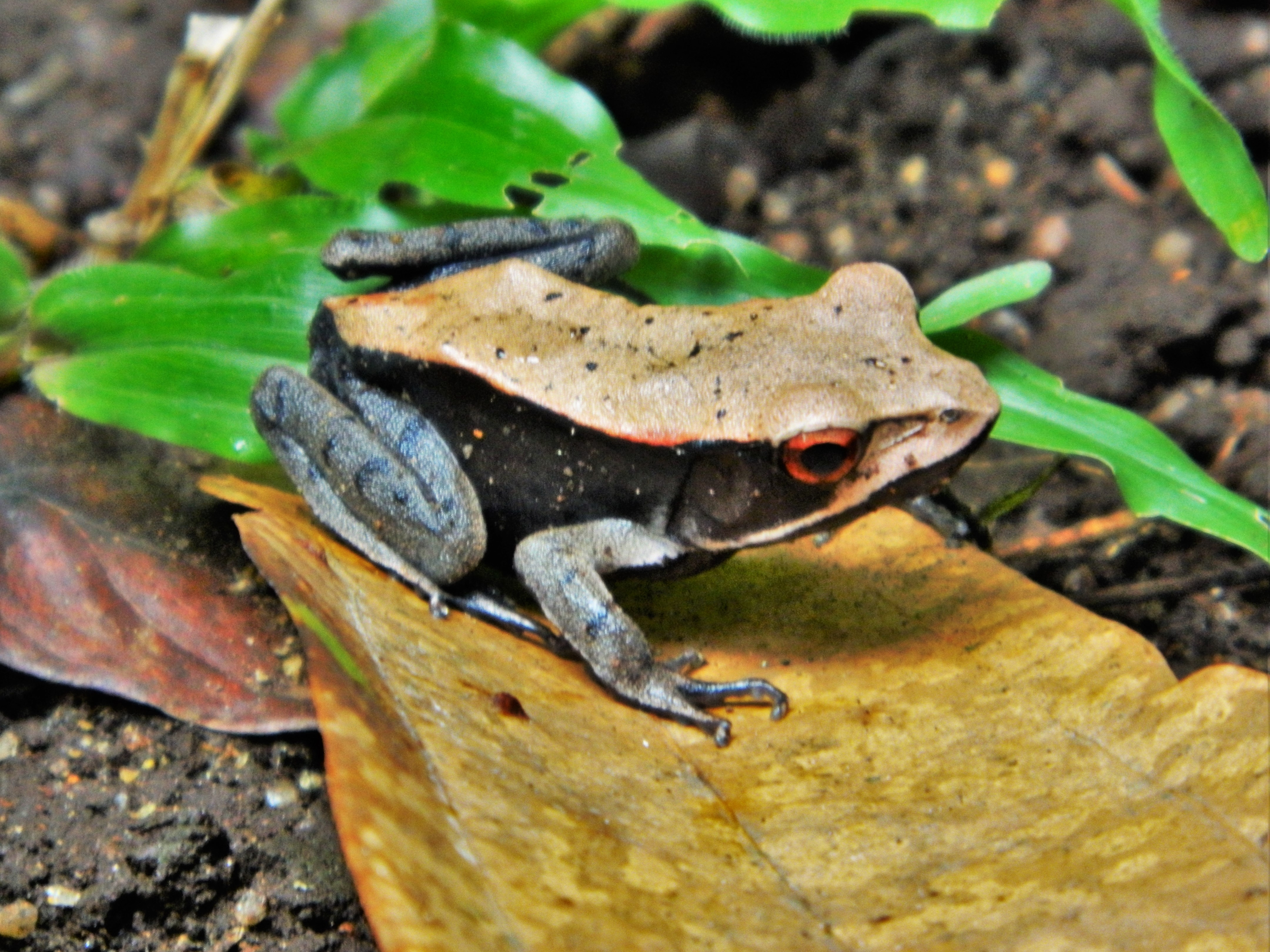
Bicolored frog (Clinotarsus curtipes) is endemic to the Western Ghats of India.

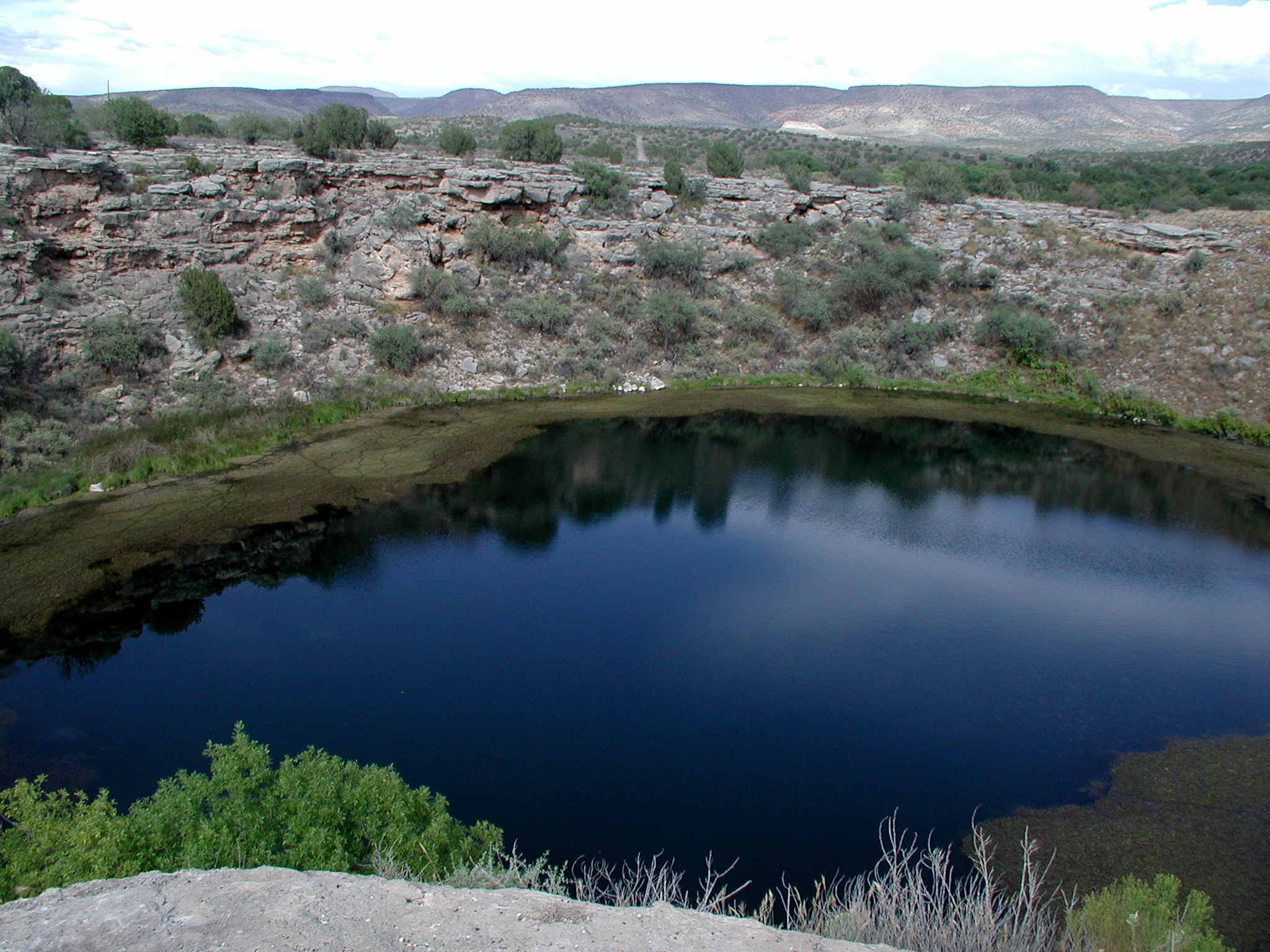
Montezuma Well in the Verde Valley of Arizona contains at least five endemic species found exclusively in the sinkhole.

Endemism is the state of a species being found only in a singular defined geographic location, such as an island, state, nation, country or other defined zone; organisms that are indigenous to a place are not endemic to it if they are also found elsewhere. For example, the Cape sugarbird (Promerops cafer) is found exclusively in southwestern South Africa and is therefore said to be endemic to that particular part of the world. An endemic species can also be referred to as an endemism or, in scientific literature, as an endemite.

Endemism is an important concept in conservation biology for measuring biodiversity in a particular place and evaluating the risk of extinction for species. Endemism is also of interest in evolutionary biology, because it provides clues about how changes in the environment cause species to undergo range shifts (potentially expanding their range into a larger area or becoming extirpated from an area they once lived), go extinct, or diversify into more species.

The extreme opposite of an endemic species is one with a cosmopolitan distribution, having a global or widespread range.

An uncommonly used alternative term for a species that is endemic is precinctive, which applies to species (and other taxonomic levels) that are restricted to a defined geographical area. Other terms that sometimes are used interchangeably, but less often, include autochthonal, autochthonic, and indigenous; however, these terms do not reflect the status of a species that specifically belongs only to a determined place.

== Etymology ==
The word endemic is from Neo-Latin endēmicus, from Greek ἔνδημος, éndēmos, "native". Éndēmos is formed of ἐν, en, meaning "in, within", and δῆμος, demos, "the people". The word entered the English language as a loan word from the French endémique, and originally seems to have been used in the sense of diseases that occur at a constant amount in a country, as opposed to epidemic diseases, which are exploding in cases. In 1872, it was Charles Darwin who first used endemic to mean a species restricted to a specific location, although, as already mentioned, it now can apply to a genus, family, or even a higher taxonomic rank.

The less common term precinctive has been used by some biologists as the equivalent of endemic. Precinctive was coined in 1900 by entomologist David Sharp when describing Hawaiian insects, for he was uncomfortable with the public health associations of endemic. In 1917, botanist Vaughan MacCaughey, also working in Hawaii, was the first to use precinctive in his speciality.

== Overview ==
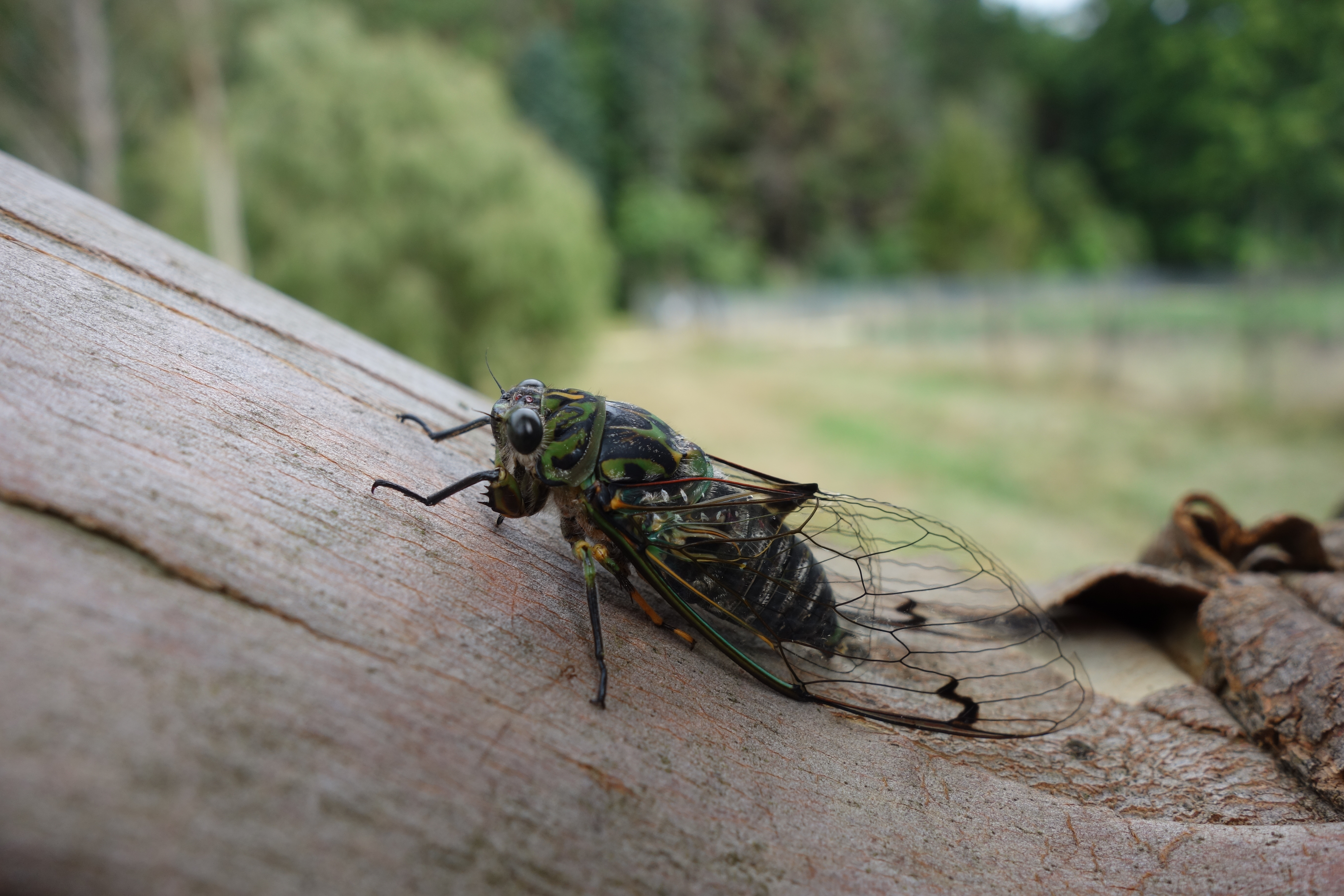
Chorus cicada (Amphipsalta zelandica), a species endemic to New Zealand

A species is considered to be endemic to the area where it is found naturally, to the exclusion of other areas; presence in captivity or botanical gardens does not disqualify a species from being endemic. In theory, the term "endemic" could be applied on any scale; for example, the cougar is endemic to the Americas, and all known life is endemic to Earth. However, endemism is normally used only when a species has a relatively small or restricted range. This usage of "endemic" contrasts with "cosmopolitan". Endemics are not necessarily rare; some might be common where they occur. Likewise, not all rare species are endemics; some may have a large range but be rare throughout this range.

=== Origins ===
The evolutionary history of a species can lead to endemism in multiple ways. Allopatric speciation, or geographic speciation, is when two populations of a species become geographically separated from each other and, as a result, develop into different species. In isolated areas where there is little possibility for organisms to disperse to new places or to receive new gene flow from outside, the rate of endemism is particularly high. For example, many endemic species are found on remote islands, such as Hawaii, the Galápagos Islands and Socotra. Populations on an island are isolated, with little opportunity to interbreed with outside populations, which eventually causes reproductive isolation and separation into different species. Darwin's finches in the Galápagos archipelago are examples of species endemic to islands. Similarly, isolated mountainous regions like the Ethiopian Highlands, or large bodies of water far from other lakes, like Lake Baikal, can also have high rates of endemism.

Endemism can also be created in areas that act as refuges for species during times of climate change like ice ages. These changes may have caused species to become repeatedly restricted to regions with unusually stable climate conditions, leading to high concentrations of endemic species in areas resistant to climate fluctuations. Endemic species that used to exist in a much larger area but died out in most of their range are called paleoendemic, in contrast to neoendemic species, which are new species that have not dispersed beyond their range. The ginkgo tree, Ginkgo biloba, is one example of a paleoendemic species.

In many cases, biological factors, such as low rates of dispersal or returning to the spawning area (philopatry), can cause a particular group of organisms to have high speciation rates and thus many endemic species. For example, cichlids in the East African Rift Lakes have diversified into many more endemic species than the other fish families in the same lakes, possibly due to such factors. Plants that become endemic on isolated islands are often those that have a high rate of dispersal and are able to reach such islands by being dispersed by birds. While birds are less likely to be endemic to a region based on their ability to disperse via flight, there are over 2,500 species that are considered endemic, meaning that the species is restricted to an area less than five million hectares (twelve million acres).

Microorganisms were traditionally not believed to form endemics. The hypothesis 'everything is everywhere,' first stated in Dutch by Lourens G.M. Baas Becking in 1934, describes the theory that the distribution of organisms smaller than 2 mm is cosmopolitan where habitats occur that support their growth.

== Subtypes and definitions ==
Endemism can reflect a wide variety of evolutionary histories, so researchers often use more specialized terms that categorize endemic species based upon how they came to be endemic to an area. Different categorizations of endemism also capture the uniqueness and irreplaceability of biodiversity hotspots differently and impact how those hotspots are defined, affecting how resources for conservation are allocated.

The first subcategories were first introduced by Claude P. E. Favager and Juliette Contandriopoulis in 1961: schizoendemics, apoendemics and patroendemics. Using this work, Ledyard Stebbins and Jack Major then introduced the concepts of neoendemics and paleoendemics in 1965 to describe the endemics of California. Endemic taxa can also be classified into autochthonous, allochthonous, taxonomic relicts and biogeographic relicts.

Paleoendemism refers to species that were formerly widespread but are now restricted to a smaller area. Neoendemism refers to species that have recently arisen, such as through divergence and reproductive isolation or through hybridization and polyploidy in plants, and have not dispersed beyond a limited range.

Paleoendemism is more or less synonymous with the concept of a 'relict species': a population or taxon of organisms that were more widespread or more diverse in the past. A 'relictual population' is a population that currently occurs in a restricted area but whose original range was far wider during a previous geologic epoch. Similarly, a 'relictual taxon' is a taxon (e.g. species or other lineage) that is the sole surviving representative of a formerly diverse group.

The concept of phylogenetic endemism has also been used to measure the relative uniqueness of the species endemic to an area. Measurements that incorporate phylogenetic endemism weight the branches of the evolutionary tree according to their narrow distribution. This captures not only the total number of taxa endemic to the area (taxonomic endemism) but also how distant those species are from their living relatives.

Types of neoendemics include schizoendemics, apoendemics, and patroendemics. Schizoendemics arise from a wider distributed taxon that has become reproductively isolated without becoming (potentially) genetically isolated—a schizoendemic has the same chromosome count as the parent taxon it evolved from. An apoendemic is a polyploid of the parent taxon (or taxa in the case of allopolyploids), whereas a patroendemic has a lower, diploid chromosome count than the related, more widely distributed polyploid taxon. Mikio Ono coined the term 'aneuendemics' in 1991 for species that have more or fewer chromosomes than their relatives due to aneuploidy.

Pseudoendemics are taxa that have possibly recently evolved from a mutation. Holoendemics is a concept introduced by Richardson in 1978 to describe taxa that have remained endemic to a restricted distribution for a very long time.

In a 2000 paper, Myers and de Grave further attempted to redefine the concept. In their view, everything is endemic; even cosmopolitan species are endemic to Earth, and earlier definitions restricting endemics to specific locations are wrong. So, the categories of neoendemics and paleoendemics do not really help in studying where species are found, because they assume that an endemic species only exists in one specific area. Instead, they propose four different categories: holoendemics, euryendemics, stenoendemics and rhoendemics. In their scheme, cryptoendemics and euendemics are further subdivisions of rhoendemics. In their view, a holoendemic is a cosmopolitan species. Stenoendemics, also known as local endemics, have a reduced distribution and are synonymous with the word 'endemics' in the traditional sense, whereas euryendemics have a larger distribution—both these have distributions that are more or less continuous. A rhoendemic has a disjunct distribution. In cases where the disjunct distribution happens because of vicariance, a euendemic's separation is due to geological events like tectonic plate movements, while a cryptoendemic's separation occurs because the populations in between have gone extinct. There is yet another possible situation that can cause a disjunct distribution, where a species is able to colonize new territories by crossing over areas of unsuitable habitat, such as plants colonizing an island—which they dismiss as extremely rare and for which they do not devise a name. Traditionally, none of Myers and de Grave's categories would be considered endemics except stenoendemics.

== Environments ==
Some environments are particularly conducive to the development of endemic species, either because they allow the persistence of relict taxa that were extirpated elsewhere or because they provide mechanisms for isolation and opportunities to fill new niches.

=== Soil ===
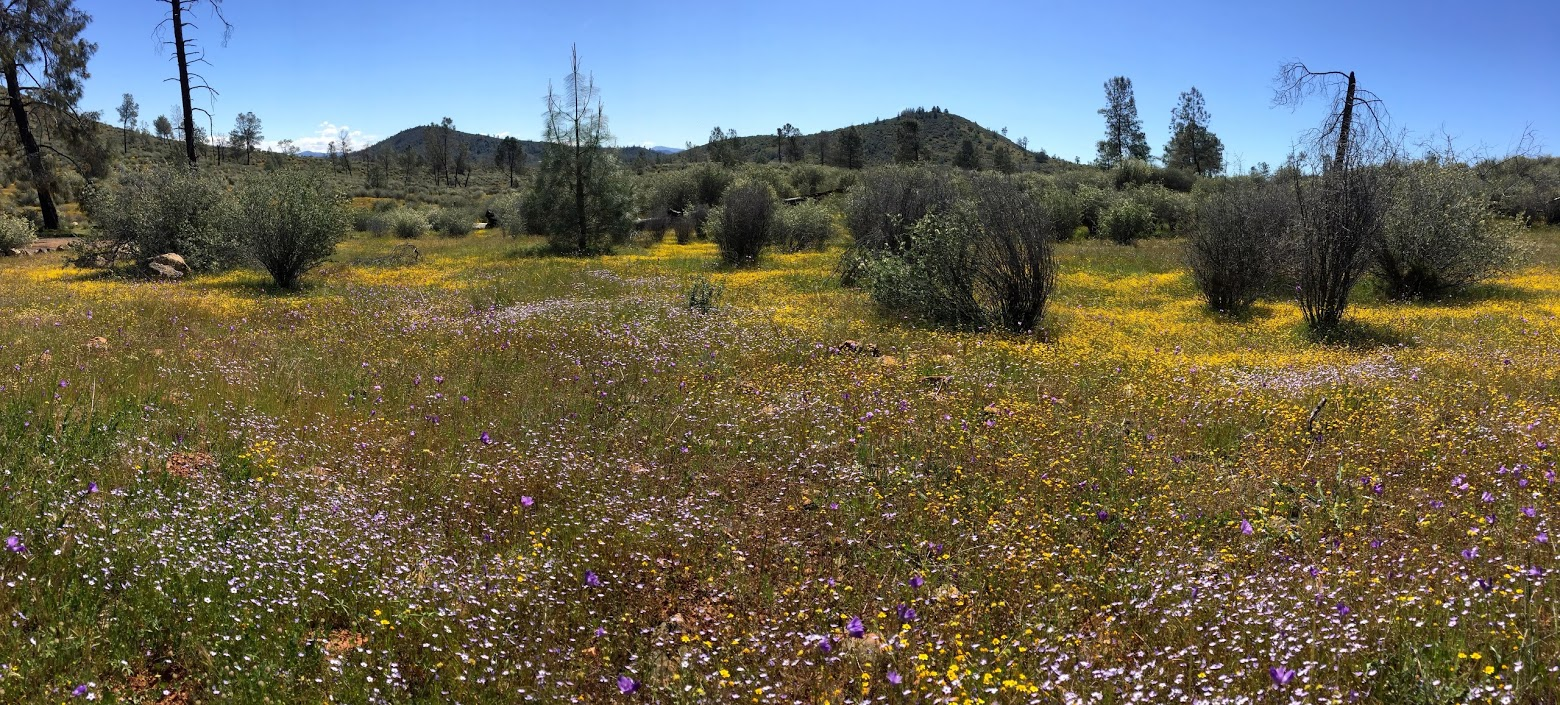
Red Hills near Tuolumne County, California: a serpentine grassland

Serpentine soils act as 'edaphic islands' of low fertility and these soils lead to high rates of endemism. These soils are found in the Balkan Peninsula, Turkey, the Alps, Cuba, New Caledonia, South Africa, Zimbabwe, the North American Appalachians, and scattered distribution in California, Oregon, and Washington and elsewhere. For example, Mayer and Soltis considered the widespread subspecies Streptanthus glandulosus subsp. glandulosus which grows on normal soils, to be a paleoendemic, whereas closely related endemic forms of S. glandulosus occurring on serpentine soil patches are neoendemics that recently evolved from subsp. glandulosus.

=== Caves ===
Obligate cave-dwelling species, known as troglobites, are often endemic to small areas, even to single individual caves, because cave habitats are by nature restricted, isolated, and fragmented. A high level of adaptation to a cave environment limits an organism's ability to disperse, since caves are often not connected to each other. One hypothesis for how closely related troglobite species could become isolated from one another in different caves is that their common ancestor may have been less restricted to cave habitats. When climate conditions became unfavorable, the ancestral species was extirpated from the surface, but some populations survived in caves, and diverged into different species due to lack of gene flow between them.

=== Islands ===
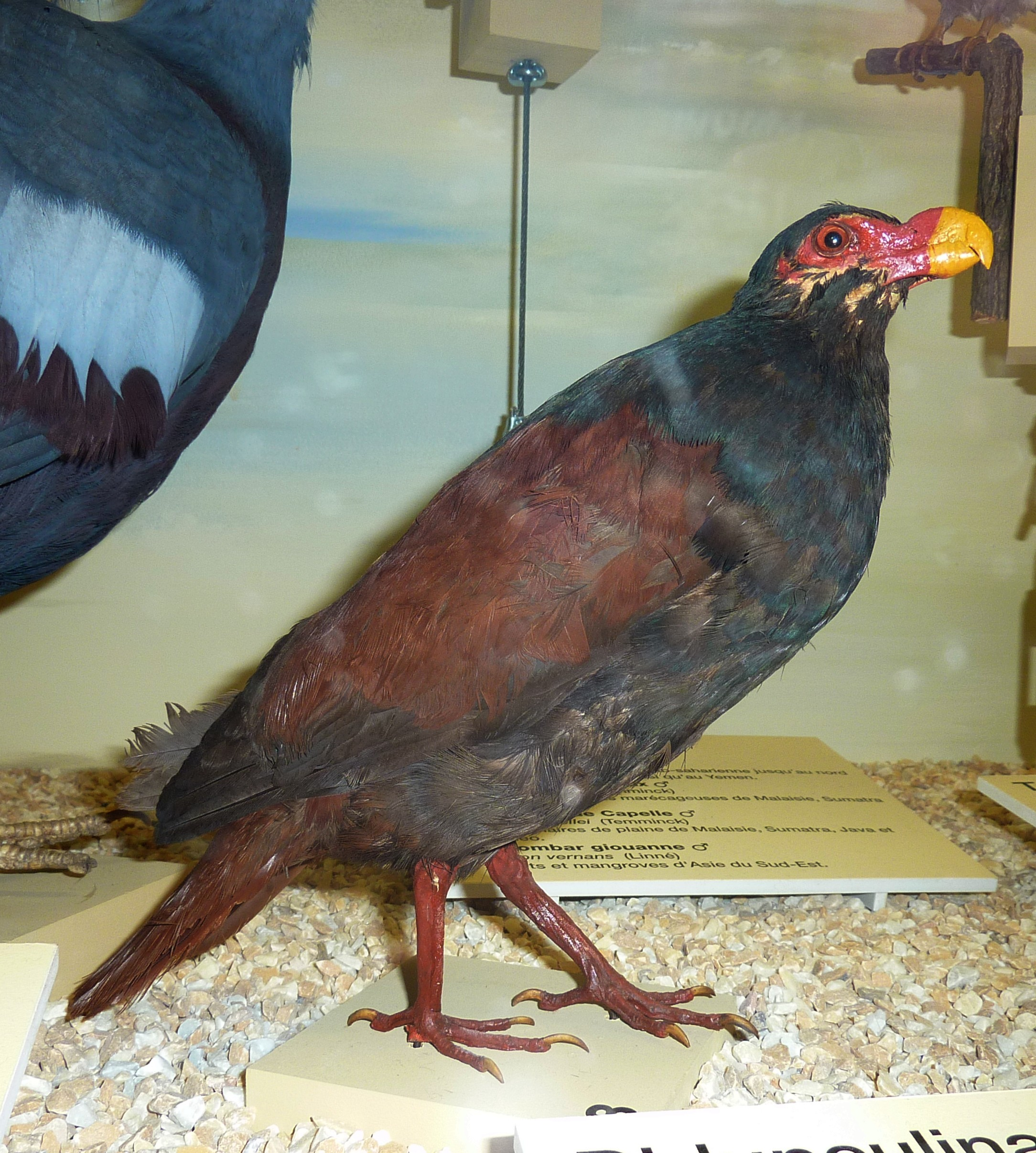
a specimen of the Tooth-billed pigeon, endemic to Samoa, where it's considered the country's national bird

Isolated islands commonly develop a number of endemics. Many species and other higher taxonomic groups exist in very small terrestrial or aquatic islands, which restrict their distribution. The Devil's Hole pupfish, Cyprinodon diabolis, has its whole native population restricted to a spring that is 20 x 3 meters in Nevada's Mojave Desert. This 'aquatic island' is connected to an underground basin; however, the population present in the pool remains isolated.

Other areas very similar to the Galapagos Islands of the Pacific Ocean exist and foster high rates of endemism. The Socotra Archipelago of Yemen, located in the Indian Ocean, has seen a new endemic species of parasitic leech, Myxobdella socotrensis, appear. This species is restricted to freshwater springs, where it may attach to and feed upon native crabs.

=== Mountains ===
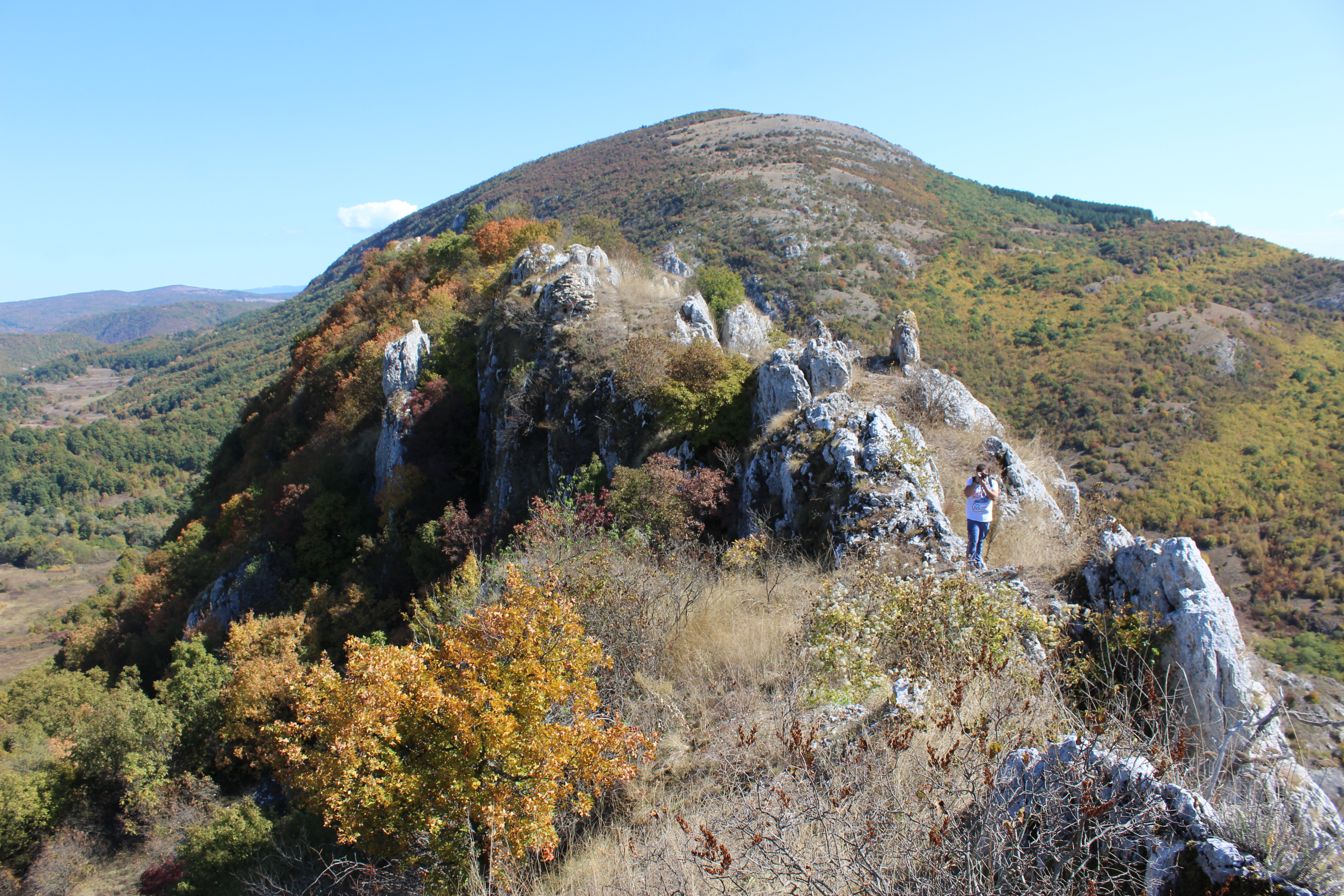
Cinder cones and vegetation of Kula Volcano in Turkey

Mountains can be seen as 'sky islands': refugia of endemics because species that live in the cool climates of mountain peaks are geographically isolated. For example, in the Alpes-Maritimes department of France, Saxifraga florulenta is an endemic plant that may have evolved in the Late Miocene and could have once been widespread across the Mediterranean Basin.

Volcanoes also tend to harbor a number of endemic species. Plants on volcanoes tend to fill a specialized ecological niche, with a very restrictive range due to the unique environmental characteristics. The Kula Volcano, one of the fourteen volcanoes in Turkey, is home to 13 endemic species of plants.

== Conservation ==
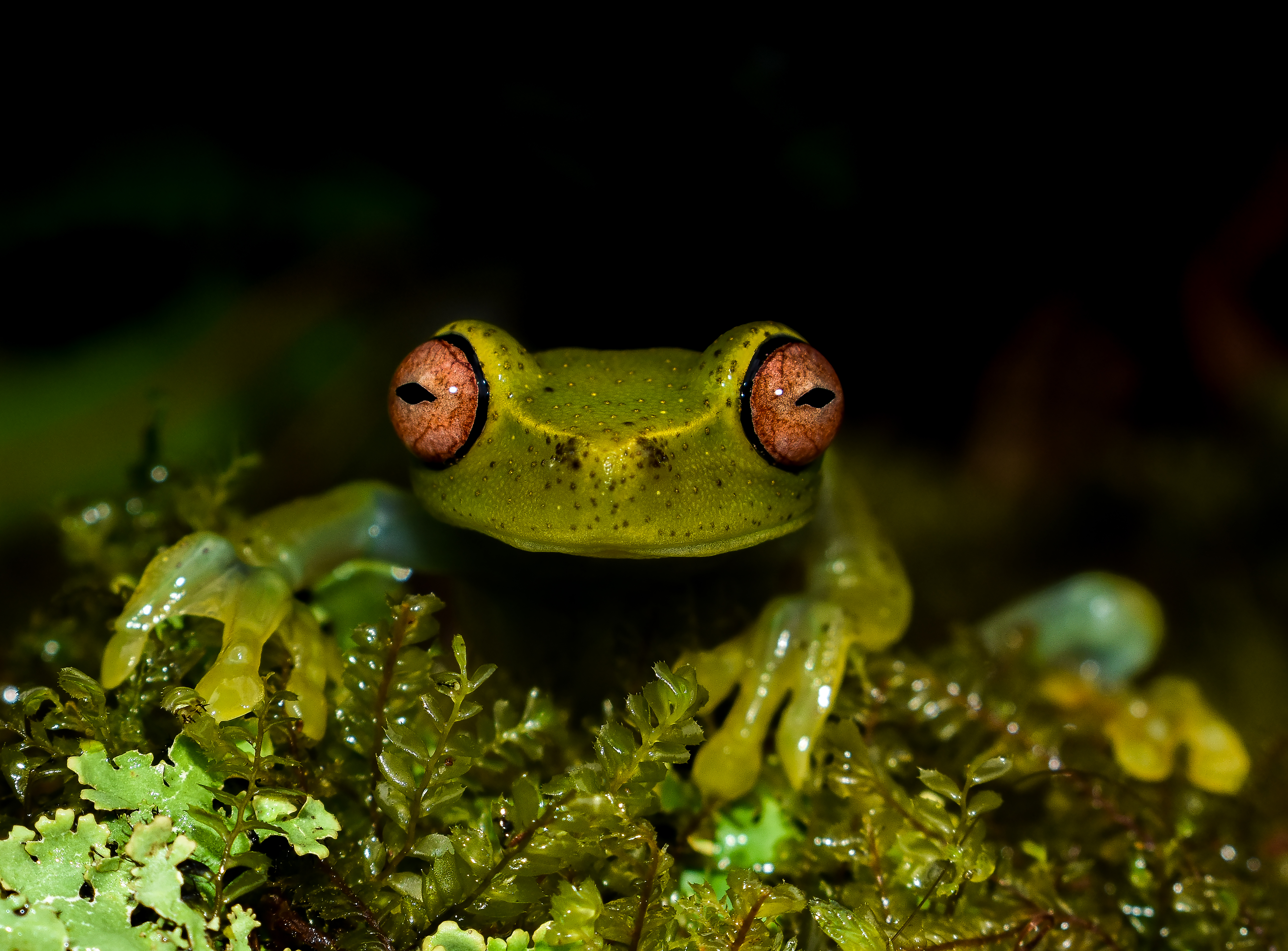
Aplastodiscus arildae, a species of frog that is endemic to Brazil

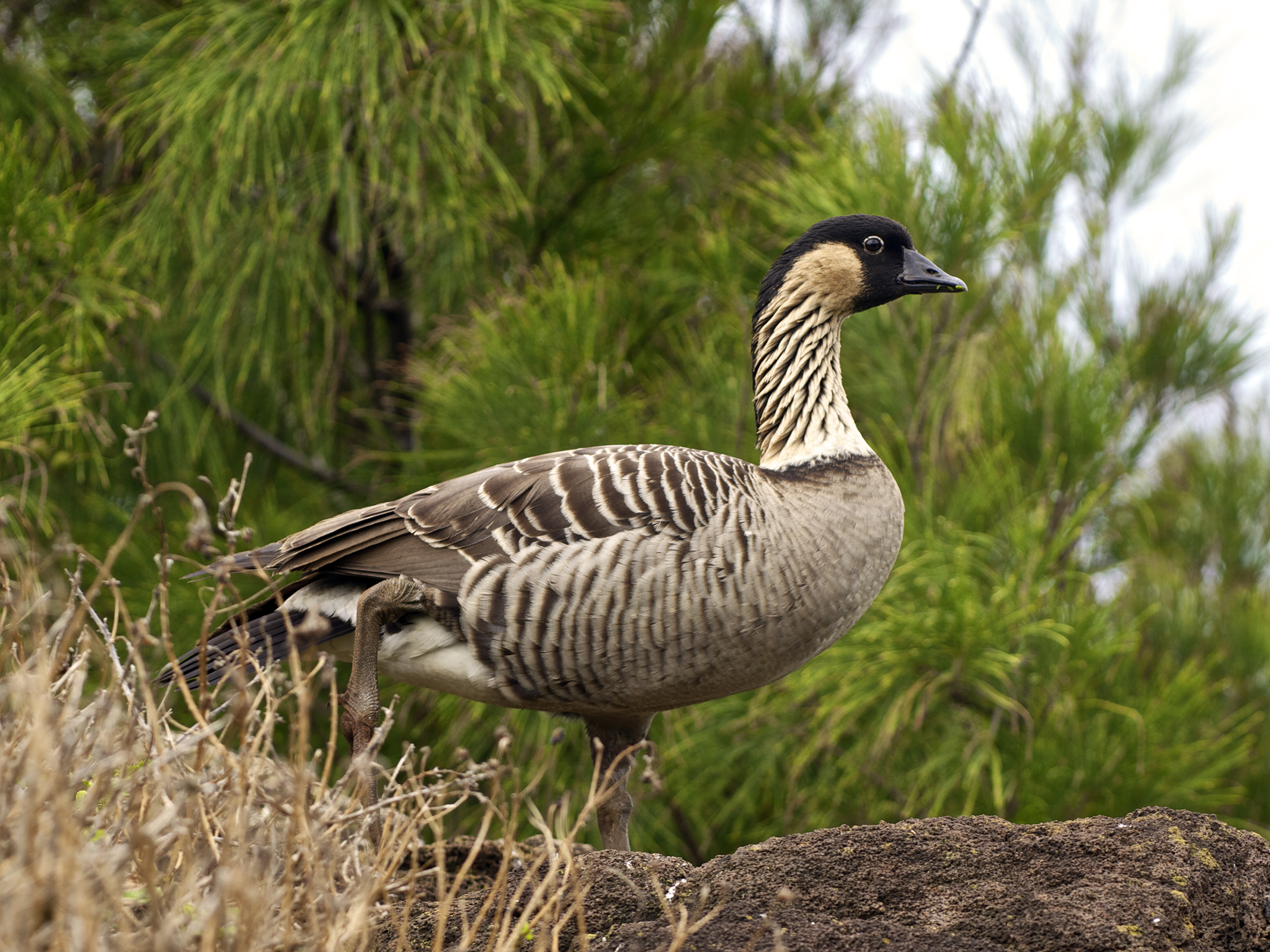
The nene (Branta sandvicensis) is endemic to the Hawaiian islands, but was introduced to WWT Slimbridge in the UK to increase its numbers for reintroduction to its native range.

Endemics might more easily become endangered or extinct because they are already restricted in distribution. This puts endemic plants and animals at greater risk than widespread species during the rapid climate change of this century. Some scientists claim that the presence of endemic species in an area is a good method to find geographical regions that can be considered priorities for conservation. Endemism can thus be studied as a proxy for measuring biodiversity of a region.

The concept of finding endemic species that occur in the same region to designate 'endemism hotspots' was first proposed by Paul Müller in a 1973 book. According to him, this is only possible where 1.) the taxonomy of the species in question is not in dispute; 2.) the species distribution is accurately known; and 3.) the species have relatively small distributional ranges.

In a 2000 article, Myers et al. used the standard of having more than 0.5% of the world's plant species being endemic to the region to designate 25 geographical areas of the world as biodiversity hotspots.

In response to the above, the World Wildlife Fund has split the world into a few hundred geographical 'ecoregions'. These have been designed to include as many species as possible that only occur in a single ecoregion, and these species are thus 'endemics' to these ecoregions. Since plenty of these ecoregions have a high prevalence of endemics, many national parks have been formed around or within them to further promote conservation. The Caparaó National Park was formed in the Atlantic Forest, a biodiversity hotspot located in Brazil, in order to help protect valuable and vulnerable species.

Other scientists have argued that endemism is not an appropriate measure of biodiversity because the levels of threat or biodiversity are not actually correlated to areas of high endemism. When using bird species as an example, it was found that only 2.5% of biodiversity hotspots correlate with endemism and the threatened nature of a geographic region. A similar pattern had been found regarding mammals, Lasioglossum bees, Plusiinae moths, and swallowtail butterflies in North America: these different groups of taxa did not correlate geographically with each other regarding endemism and species richness. Especially using mammals as flagship species proved to be a poor system of identifying and protecting areas of high invertebrate biodiversity. In response to this, other scientists again defended the concept by using WWF ecoregions and reptiles, finding that most reptile endemics occur in WWF ecoregions with high biodiversity.

Other conservation efforts for endemics include keeping captive and semi-captive populations in zoological parks and botanical gardens. These methods are ex situ ("off-site") conservation methods. The use of such methods may not only offer refuge and protection for individuals of declining or vulnerable populations, but it may also allow biologists valuable opportunities to research them as well.
