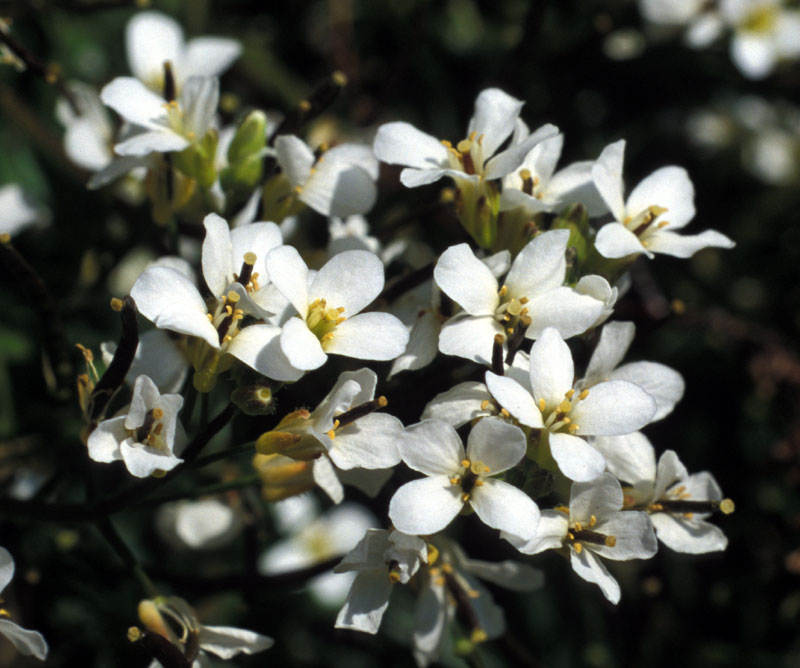
- Lapland whitlow-grass, Draba lactea

Scientific classification
- Kingdom: Plantae
- Clade: Tracheophytes
- Clade: Angiosperms
- Clade: Eudicots
- Clade: Rosids
- Order: Brassicales
- Family: Brassicaceae
- Genus: Draba; L.

Type species
- Draba verna L.

Synonyms
- List: Aizodraba Fourr.; Coelonema Maxim.; Consana Adans.; Dolichostylis Turcz.; Dollineria Saut.; Drabella Nábelek; Drabopsis K.Koch; Eriophila Rchb.; Erophila DC.; Gansblum Adans.; Holarges Ehrh.; Holargidium Turcz. ex Ledeb.; Leptonema Hook.; Nesodraba Greene; Odontocyclus Turcz.; Paronychia Hill; Pseudobraya Korsh.; Schievereckia Nyman, orth. var.; Schivereckia Andrz. ex DC.; Stenonema Hook. ex Benth. & Hook.f.; Thylocodraba O.E.Schulz

= Draba =

Genus of flowering plants

Draba is a large genus of flowering plants in the family Brassicaceae, commonly known as whitlow-grasses (though they are not related to the true grasses).

== Species ==
433 species are accepted.

- Draba abajoensis Windham & Al-Shehbaz
- Draba × abiskoensis O.E.Schulz
- Draba × abiskojokkensis O.E.Schulz
- Draba acaulis Boiss.
- Draba acutidentata Bomble
- Draba affghanica Boiss.
- Draba airdii G.A.Mulligan
- Draba aizoides L.
- Draba alajica Litv.
- Draba alberti Regel & Schmalh.
- Draba albertina Greene
- Draba × algida Adams ex DC.
- Draba alpina L.
- Draba alshehbazii Klimeš & D.A.German
- Draba altaica (C.A.Mey.) Bunge
- Draba alyssoides Humb. & Bonpl. ex DC.
- Draba × amandae O.E.Schulz
- Draba × ambigua Ledeb.
- Draba amoena O.E.Schulz
- Draba amplexicaulis Franch.
- Draba ancashensis Al-Shehbaz, A.Cano & Trinidad
- Draba antilibanotica Al-Shehbaz
- Draba aquisgranensis Bomble
- Draba arabisans Michx.
- Draba arauquensis Santana
- Draba arbuscula Hook.f.
- Draba arctica J.Vahl
- Draba arctogena (Ekman) Ekman
- Draba aretioides Humb. & Bonpl. ex DC.
- Draba argentifolia Al-Shehbaz
- Draba argyrea Rydb.
- Draba arida C.L.Hitchc.
- Draba arseniewii (B.Fedtsch.) Gilg ex Tolm.
- Draba aspera Bertol.
- Draba × asplundii O.E.Schulz
- Draba asprella Greene
- Draba asterophora Payson
- Draba aubrietioides Jafri
- Draba aucheri Boiss.
- Draba aurea Vahl ex Hornem.
- Draba aureola S.Watson
- Draba bagmatiensis Al-Shehbaz
- Draba baicalensis Tolm.
- Draba bajtenovii Veselova
- Draba barclayana Al-Shehbaz
- Draba barguzinensis (O.D.Nikif.) Baikov
- Draba bartholomewii Al-Shehbaz
- Draba beamanii Rollins
- Draba bellardii S.F.Blake
- Draba bertiscea Lakusic & Stevanovic
- Draba bhutanica H.Hara
- Draba bifurcata (C.L.Hitchc.) Al-Shehbaz & Windham
- Draba × blyttii O.E.Schulz
- Draba bocheri Gjaerev. & Ryvarden
- Draba boliviana O.E.Schulz
- Draba × borderi O.E.Schulz
- Draba borealis DC.
- Draba boyacana Al-Shehbaz
- Draba brachystemon DC.
- Draba brachystylis Rydb.
- Draba brackenridgei A.Gray
- Draba × brandtii O.E.Schulz
- Draba breweri S.Watson
- Draba bruce-bennettii Al-Shehbaz
- Draba bruniifolia Steven
- Draba bryoides DC.
- Draba burkartiana O.E.Schulz
- Draba burkei (C.L.Hitchc.) Windham & Beilstein
- Draba × buschii O.E.Schulz
- Draba cachemirica Gand.
- Draba cacuminum E.Ekman
- Draba cajamarcensis Al-Shehbaz
- Draba calcicola O.E.Schulz
- Draba californica (Jeps.) Rollins & R.A.Price
- Draba cana Rydb.
- Draba canoensis Al-Shehbaz, Trinidad, Ed.Navarro & Rodr.-Paredes
- Draba cantabriae (Laínz) Laínz
- Draba cappadocica Boiss. & Balansa
- Draba cardaminiflora Kom.
- Draba carnosula O.E.Schulz
- Draba caswellii G.A.Mulligan & Al-Shehbaz
- Draba catlingii G.A.Mulligan
- Draba cayouettei G.A.Mulligan & Al-Shehbaz
- Draba cemileae Karaer
- Draba chamissonis G.Don
- Draba cheiranthoides Hook.f.
- Draba chionophila S.F.Blake
- Draba cholaensis W.W.Sm.
- Draba cinerea Adams
- Draba cocuyana Al-Shehbaz
- Draba cocuyensis Santana & J.O.Rangel
- Draba compacta Schott, Nyman & Kotschy
- Draba confertifolia Turcz.
- Draba corrugata S.Watson
- Draba corymbosa R.Br. ex DC.
- Draba crassa Rydb.
- Draba crassifolia Graham
- Draba cretica Boiss. & Heldr.
- Draba cruciata Payson
- Draba cryophila Cuatrec.
- Draba cryptantha Hook.f.
- Draba cuatrecasasiana J.O.Rangel & Santana
- Draba cusickii C.B.Rob. ex O.E.Schulz
- Draba cuspidata M.Bieb.
- Draba cuzcoensis O.E.Schulz
- Draba cyclomorpha Payson
- Draba czuensis Revuschkin & A.L.Ebel
- Draba darbyshirei G.A.Mulligan
- Draba darwasica Lipsky
- Draba daurica DC.
- Draba daviesiae (C.L.Hitchc.) Rollins
- Draba × davosiana Brügger
- Draba × decipiens O.E.Schulz
- Draba dedeana Boiss. & Reut.
- Draba demareei Wiggins
- Draba densifolia Nutt.
- Draba depressa Hook.f.
- Draba diazii Rivas Mart., M.E.García & Penas
- Draba discoidea Wedd.
- Draba × districta O.E.Schulz
- Draba diversifolia Boiss. & A.Huet
- Draba doerfleri Wettst.
- Draba dolomitica Buttler
- Draba dongchuanensis Al-Shehbaz, J.P.Yue, T.Deng & H.L.Chen
- Draba dorneri Heuff.
- Draba draboides (Maxim.) Al-Shehbaz
- Draba droserifolia Bomble
- Draba dubia Suter
- Draba ecuadoriana Al-Shehbaz
- Draba edmondii Al-Shehbaz
- Draba × ekmaniana Weingerl
- Draba elata Hook.f. & Thomson
- Draba elegans Boiss.
- Draba elisabethae N.Busch
- Draba ellipsoidea Hook.f. & Thomson
- Draba eriopoda Turcz. ex Ledeb.
- Draba eschscholtzii Pohle & N.Busch
- Draba extensa Wedd.
- Draba exunguiculata (O.E.Schulz) C.L.Hitchc.
- Draba falconeri O.E.Schulz
- Draba farsetioides Linden & Planch.
- Draba fedtschenkoi Gilg ex Tolm.
- Draba × ficta Camus ex Hayek
- Draba fladnizensis Wulfen
- Draba franktonii G.A.Mulligan & Al-Shehbaz
- Draba fuhaiensis Z.X.An
- Draba funckiana Linden & Planch.
- Draba funckii (Turcz.) Al-Shehbaz
- Draba funiculosa Hook.f.
- Draba gilgiana Muschl.
- Draba gilliesii Hook. & Arn.
- Draba glabella Pursh
- Draba glabrescens (Jord.) Hayek & Wibiral
- Draba glacialis Adams
- Draba glauca Bomble
- Draba globosa Payson
- Draba glomerata Royle
- Draba gracillima Hook.f. & Thomson
- Draba graminea Greene
- Draba grayana (Rydb.) C.L.Hitchc.
- Draba hallii Hook.f.
- Draba hammenii Cuatrec. & Cleef
- Draba handelii O.E.Schulz
- Draba haradjianii Rech.f.
- Draba × harry-smithii O.E.Schulz
- Draba haynaldii Stur
- Draba healyi G.A.Mulligan & Al-Shehbaz
- Draba heilii Al-Shehbaz
- Draba helleriana Greene
- Draba hemsleyana Gilg
- Draba henrici Al-Shehbaz
- Draba hidalgensis Calderón
- Draba himachalensis Al-Shehbaz
- Draba hirta L.
- Draba hispanica Boiss.
- Draba hispida Willd.
- Draba hissarica Lipsky
- Draba hitchcockii Rollins
- Draba hookeri Walp.
- Draba hoppeana Rchb.
- Draba howellii S.Watson
- Draba huetii Boiss.
- Draba humbertii Al-Shehbaz
- Draba humillima O.E.Schulz
- Draba hyperborea (L.) Desv.
- Draba imbricata C.A.Mey.
- Draba imeretica (Rupr.) Rupr.
- Draba implexa Rollins
- Draba incana L.
- Draba incerta Payson
- Draba × incerta O.E.Schulz
- Draba incompta Steven
- Draba incrassata (Rollins) Rollins & R.A.Price
- Draba inexpectata S.L.Welsh
- Draba inquisiviana Al-Shehbaz
- Draba insularis Pissjauk
- Draba × intermedia Hegetschw.
- Draba involucrata (W.W.Sm.) W.W.Sm.
- Draba jaegeri Munz & I.M.Johnst.
- Draba japonica Maxim.
- Draba jorullensis Kunth
- Draba jucunda W.W.Sm.
- Draba juvenilis Kom.
- Draba kassii S.L.Welsh
- Draba × kingii O.E.Schulz
- Draba kitadakensis Koidz.
- Draba kluanei G.A.Mulligan
- Draba kodarica O.D.Nikif.
- Draba koeiei Rech.f.
- Draba kohlscheidensis Bomble
- Draba kongboiana Al-Shehbaz
- Draba korabensis Kümmerle & Degen
- Draba korschinskyi (O. Fedtsch.) Pohle ex O. Fedtsch.
- Draba korshinskyi (O.Fedtsch.) Pohle
- Draba kotschyi Stur
- Draba kuemmerlei Stevan. & D.Lakusic
- Draba kuramensis Yunusov
- Draba kusnezowii (Turcz. ex Ledeb.) Hayek
- Draba kuznetsovii (Turcz.) Hayek
- Draba lacaitae Boiss.
- Draba laconica Stevan. & Kit Tan
- Draba lactea Adams
- Draba ladina Braun-Blanq.
- Draba ladyginii Pohle
- Draba laegaardii Al-Shehbaz
- Draba lanceolata Royle
- Draba lapaziana Al-Shehbaz
- Draba × larssonii O.E.Schulz
- Draba lasiocarpa Rochel
- Draba lasiophylla Royle
- Draba × lastrungica O.E.Schulz
- Draba × lattinicciae Gamisans
- Draba laurentiana Fernald
- Draba lemmonii S.Watson
- Draba lichiangensis W.W.Sm.
- Draba × lindblomii O.E.Schulz
- Draba lindenii (Hook.) Planch. ex Sprague
- Draba linearifolia L.L.Lou & T.Y.Cheo
- Draba lipskyi Tolm.
- Draba litamo L.Uribe
- Draba loayzana Al-Shehbaz
- Draba loiseleurii Boiss.
- Draba lonchocarpa Rydb.
- Draba longiciliata Al-Shehbaz & Sklenář
- Draba longisiliqua Schmalh. ex Akinf.
- Draba longisquamosa O.E.Schulz
- Draba lunkii V.I.Dorof.
- Draba lutescens Coss.
- Draba macbeathiana Al-Shehbaz
- Draba macleanii Hook.f.
- Draba macounii O.E.Schulz
- Draba magadanensis Berkut. & A.P.Khokhr.
- Draba magellanica Lam.
- Draba maguirei C.L.Hitchc.
- Draba majae Berkut. & A.P.Khokhr.
- Draba majuscula (Jord.) Hayek & Wibiral
- Draba malpighiacea Windham & Al-Shehbaz
- Draba matangensis O.E.Schulz
- Draba matthioloides Gilg ex O.E.Schulz
- Draba melanopus Kom.
- Draba meskhetica Chinth.
- Draba metaarctica V.V.Petrovsky
- Draba micheorum Al-Shehbaz
- Draba × microcarpa (Trautv.) O.E.Schulz
- Draba microcarpella A.N.Vassiljeva & Golosk.
- Draba micropetala Hook.
- Draba mieheorum Al-Shehbaz
- Draba mingrelica Schischk. ex Grossh.
- Draba minima (C.A.Mey.) Steud.
- Draba × mixta O.E.Schulz
- Draba mogollonica Greene
- Draba mollissima Steven
- Draba mongolica Turcz.
- Draba monoensis Rollins & R.A.Price
- Draba montbretiana Sommier & Levier
- Draba mulliganii Al-Shehbaz
- Draba murrayi G.A.Mulligan
- Draba nana Stapf
- Draba narmanensis Yild.
- Draba nemorosa L.
- Draba nivalis Lilj.
- Draba nivicola Rose
- Draba norvegica Gunnerus
- Draba novolympica Payson & H.St.John
- Draba nuda (Bél.) Al-Shehbaz & M.Koch
- Draba nylamensis Al-Shehbaz
- Draba oariocarpa O.E.Schulz
- Draba oblongata R.Br. ex DC
- Draba obovata Benth.
- Draba ochroleuca Bunge
- Draba ochropetala O.E.Schulz
- Draba odudiana Lipsky
- Draba ogilviensis Hultén
- Draba olgae Regel & Schmalh.
- Draba oligosperma Hook.
- Draba olympicoides Strobl
- Draba oreades Schrenk
- Draba oreadum Maire
- Draba oreibata J.F.Macbr. & Payson
- Draba oreodoxa W.W.Sm.
- Draba orientalis Karabacak & Behçet
- Draba ossetica (Rupr.) Sommier & Levier
- Draba ovibovina (E.Ekman) E.Ekman
- Draba oxycarpa Sommerf.
- Draba pacheri Stur
- Draba pachythyrsa Triana & Planch.
- Draba paishanensis T.Mori
- Draba pakistanica Jafri
- Draba palanderiana Kjellm.
- Draba pamirica (O.Fedtsch.) Pohle
- Draba pamplonensis Planch. & Linden ex Triana & Planch.
- Draba parnassica Boiss.
- Draba parviflora (Regel & Tiling) O.E.Schulz
- Draba parvisiliquosa Tolm.
- Draba pauciflora R.Br.
- Draba paucifructa Clokey & C.L.Hitchc.
- Draba paysonii J.F.Macbr.
- Draba pectinipila Rollins
- Draba pedicellata (Rollins & R.A.Price) Windham
- Draba pennell-hazenii O.E.Schulz
- Draba pennellii Rollins
- Draba × perdubia O.E.Schulz
- Draba peruviana (DC.) O.E.Schulz
- Draba petrophila Greene
- Draba physocarpa Kom.
- Draba pickeringii A.Gray
- Draba × pilgeri O.E.Schulz
- Draba pilosa Adams ex DC.
- Draba podolica (Besser) Rupr.
- Draba pohlei Tolm.
- Draba poluniniana Al-Shehbaz
- Draba polyphylla O.E.Schulz
- Draba polytricha Ledeb.
- Draba porsildii Mulligan
- Draba praealta Greene
- Draba praecox Steven
- Draba primuloides Turcz.
- Draba pseudocheiranthoides Al-Shehbaz
- Draba × pseudonivalis N.Busch
- Draba × pseudovesicaria O.E.Schulz
- Draba pterosperma Payson
- Draba pulchella Willd. ex DC.
- Draba pulcherrima Gilg
- Draba pulvinata Turcz.
- Draba punoensis Al-Shehbaz, Ed.Navarro, Trinidad & A.Cano
- Draba pusilla F.Phil. ex Phil.
- Draba puvirnituqii G.A.Mulligan & Al-Shehbaz
- Draba pycnophylla Turcz.
- Draba pycnosperma Fernald & C.H.Knowlt.
- Draba pygmaea Turcz. ex N.Busch
- Draba quearaensis Al-Shehbaz
- Draba radicans Royle
- Draba ramosissima Desv.
- Draba ramulosa Rollins
- Draba rectifructa C.L.Hitchc.
- Draba remotiflora O.E.Schulz
- Draba rigida Willd.
- Draba rimarum (Rech.f.) Khosravi & Eslami-Farouji
- Draba ritacuvana Al-Shehbaz
- Draba rositae Santana & J.O.Rangel
- Draba rosularis Boiss.
- Draba ruaxes Payson & H.St.John
- Draba sachalinensis (Schmidt) Trautv.
- Draba sagasteguii Al-Shehbaz
- Draba sakuraii Makino
- Draba sambukii Tolm.
- Draba sanctae-martae O.E.Schulz
- Draba santaquinensis Windham & Allphin
- Draba sapozhnikovii A.L.Ebel
- Draba sarycheleki Veselova
- Draba sauteri Hoppe
- Draba saxosa Davidson
- Draba scabra C.A.Mey.
- Draba × schaeferi O.E.Schulz
- Draba schultzei O.E.Schulz
- Draba schusteri O.E.Schulz
- Draba scopulorum Wedd.
- Draba scotteri G.A.Mulligan
- Draba sekiyana Ohwi
- Draba senilis O.E.Schulz
- Draba sericea Santana & J.O.Rangel
- Draba serpentina (Tiehm & P.K.Holmgren) Al-Shehbaz & Windham
- Draba setosa Royle
- Draba sharsmithii Rollins & R.A.Price
- Draba shehbazii G.A.Mulligan
- Draba sherriffii Grierson
- Draba shiroumana Makino
- Draba sibirica (Pall.) Thell.
- Draba sierrae Sharsm.
- Draba sikkimensis (Hook.f. & T.Anderson) Pohle
- Draba siliquosa M.Bieb.
- Draba simmonsii Elven & Al-Shehbaz
- Draba simonkaiana Jáv.
- Draba smithii Gilg & O.E.Schulz
- Draba sobolifera Rydb.
- Draba soratensis Wedd.
- Draba spectabilis Greene
- Draba sphaerocarpa J.F.Macbr. & Payson
- Draba sphaeroides Payson
- Draba splendens Gilg
- Draba × spreadhoroughii O.E.Schulz
- Draba spruceana Wedd.
- Draba staintonii Jafri ex H.Hara
- Draba standleyi J.F.Macbr. & Payson
- Draba stellata Jacq.
- Draba stenobotrys Gilg & O.E.Schulz
- Draba stenocarpa Hook.f. & Thomson
- Draba stenoloba Ledeb.
- Draba stenopetala Trautv.
- Draba steyermarkii Al-Shehbaz
- Draba strasseri Greuter
- Draba streptobrachia R.A.Price
- Draba streptocarpa A.Gray
- Draba strigosula Bomble
- Draba × sturii Strobl
- Draba stylaris J.Gay ex W.D.J.Koch
- Draba stylosa Turcz.
- Draba subalpina Goodman & C.L.Hitchc.
- Draba subamplexicaulis C.A.Mey.
- Draba subcapitata Simmons
- Draba subfladnizensis Kuvaev
- Draba subnivalis Braun-Blanq.
- Draba subsecunda Sommier & Levier
- Draba subumbellata Rollins & R.A.Price
- Draba sunhangiana Al-Shehbaz
- Draba supranivalis Rupr.
- Draba supravillosa A.P.Khokhr.
- Draba surculosa Franch.
- Draba taimyrensis Tolm.
- Draba talassica Pohle
- Draba taylorii G.A.Mulligan & Al-Shehbaz
- Draba tenerrima O.E.Schulz
- Draba thlaspiformis (Phil.) Al-Shehbaz
- Draba thompsonii (C.L.Hitchc.) G.A.Mulligan & Al-Shehbaz
- Draba thylacocarpa (Nábelek) Hedge
- Draba tibetica Hook.f. & Thomson
- Draba tichomirovii Kozhevn.
- Draba tolmatchevii V.V.Petrovsky
- Draba tomentosa Clairv.
- Draba × tornensis O.E.Schulz
- Draba × traunsteineri Hoppe
- Draba trichocarpa Rollins
- Draba trinervis O.E.Schulz
- Draba tschuktschorum Trautv.
- Draba tucumanensis O.E.Schulz
- Draba tundrostepposa V.V.Petrovsky
- Draba turczaninowii Pohle & N.Busch
- Draba turgida É.Huet & A.Huet ex Ces., Pass. & Gibelli
- Draba ucuncha Al-Shehbaz
- Draba × uczkolensis B.Fedtsch.
- Draba × ursorum Gand.
- Draba ussuriensis Pohle
- Draba venezuelana Al-Shehbaz
- Draba ventosa A.Gray
- Draba verna (L.) Besser
- Draba vesicaria Desv.
- Draba violacea DC.
- Draba volcanica Benth.
- Draba vvedenskyi Kovalevsk.
- Draba weberi R.A.Price & Rollins
- Draba werffii Al-Shehbaz
- Draba wiemannii (O.E.Schulz) Hand.-Mazz.
- Draba × wilczekii O.E.Schulz
- Draba winterbottomii (Hook.f. & Thomson) Pohle
- Draba wurdackii Al-Shehbaz
- Draba xylopoda Al-Shehbaz
- Draba yueii Al-Shehbaz
- Draba yukonensis A.E.Porsild
- Draba yungayensis Al-Shehbaz
- Draba yunnanensis Franch.
- Draba yunussovii Tolm.
- Draba zangbeiensis L.L.Lu
- Draba zionensis C.L.Hitchc.

=== Formerly placed here ===
- Abdra brachycarpa (Nutt. ex Torr. & A.Gray) Greene (as Draba brachycarpa Nutt. ex Torr. & A.Gray)
- Drabella muralis (L.) Fourr. (as Draba muralis L.)
- Pseudodraba hystrix (Hook.f. & Thomson) Al-Shehbaz, D.A.German & M.Koch (as Draba hystrix Hook.f. & Thomson)
- Tomostima cuneifolia (Nutt.) Al-Shehbaz, M.Koch & Jordon-Thaden (as Draba cuneifolia Nutt.)
- Tomostima reptans (Lam.) Al-Shehbaz, M.Koch & Jordon-Thaden (as Draba reptans (Lam.) Fernald)

== Gallery ==
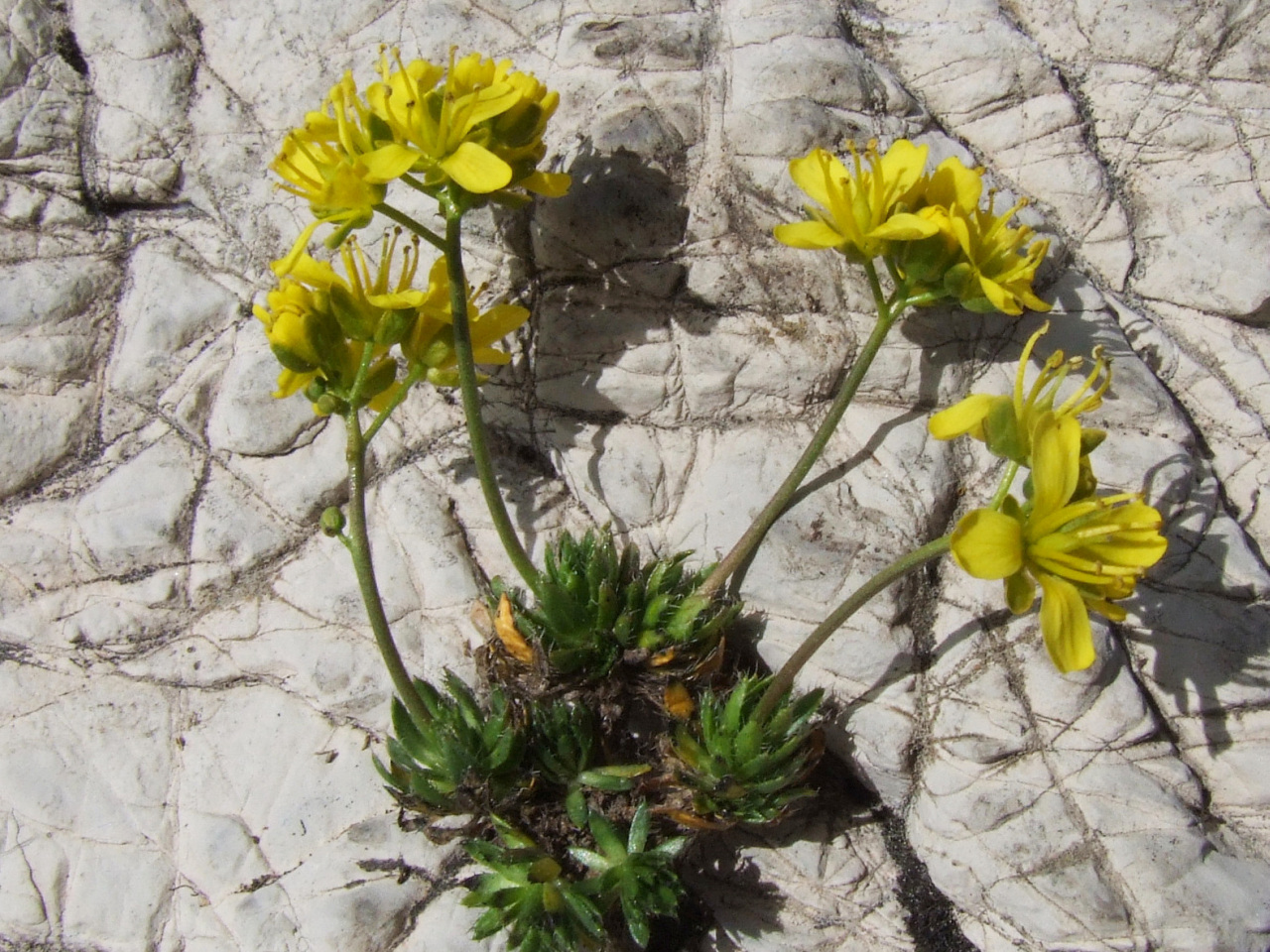
Draba aizoides

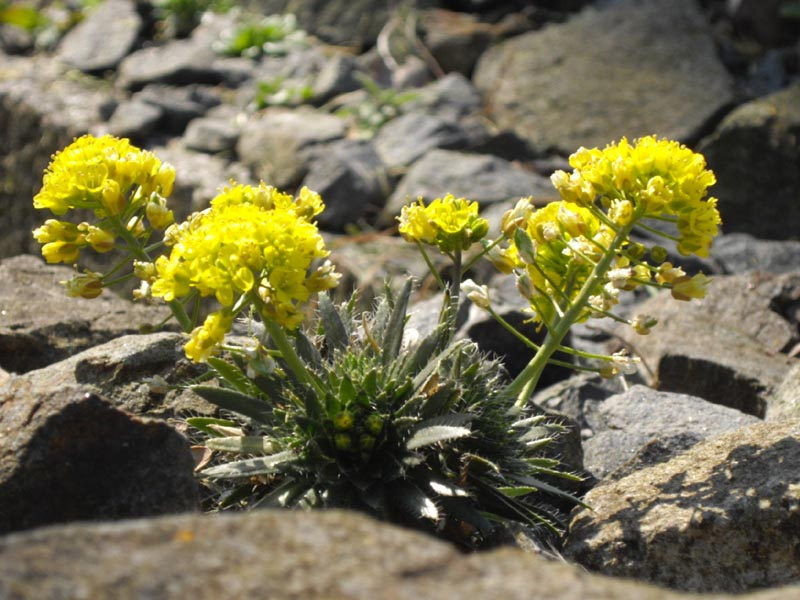
Draba cuspidata

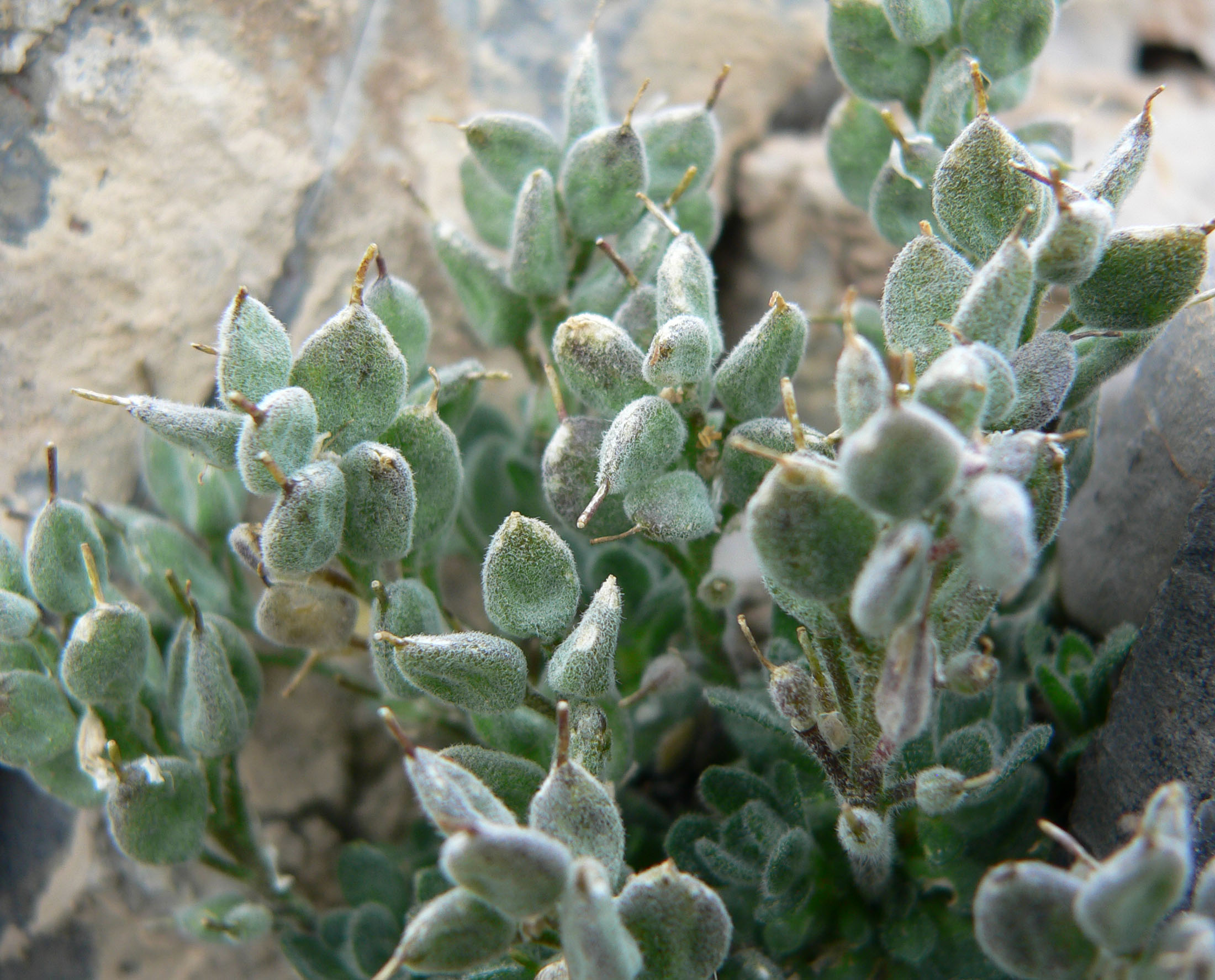
Draba jaegeri in seed

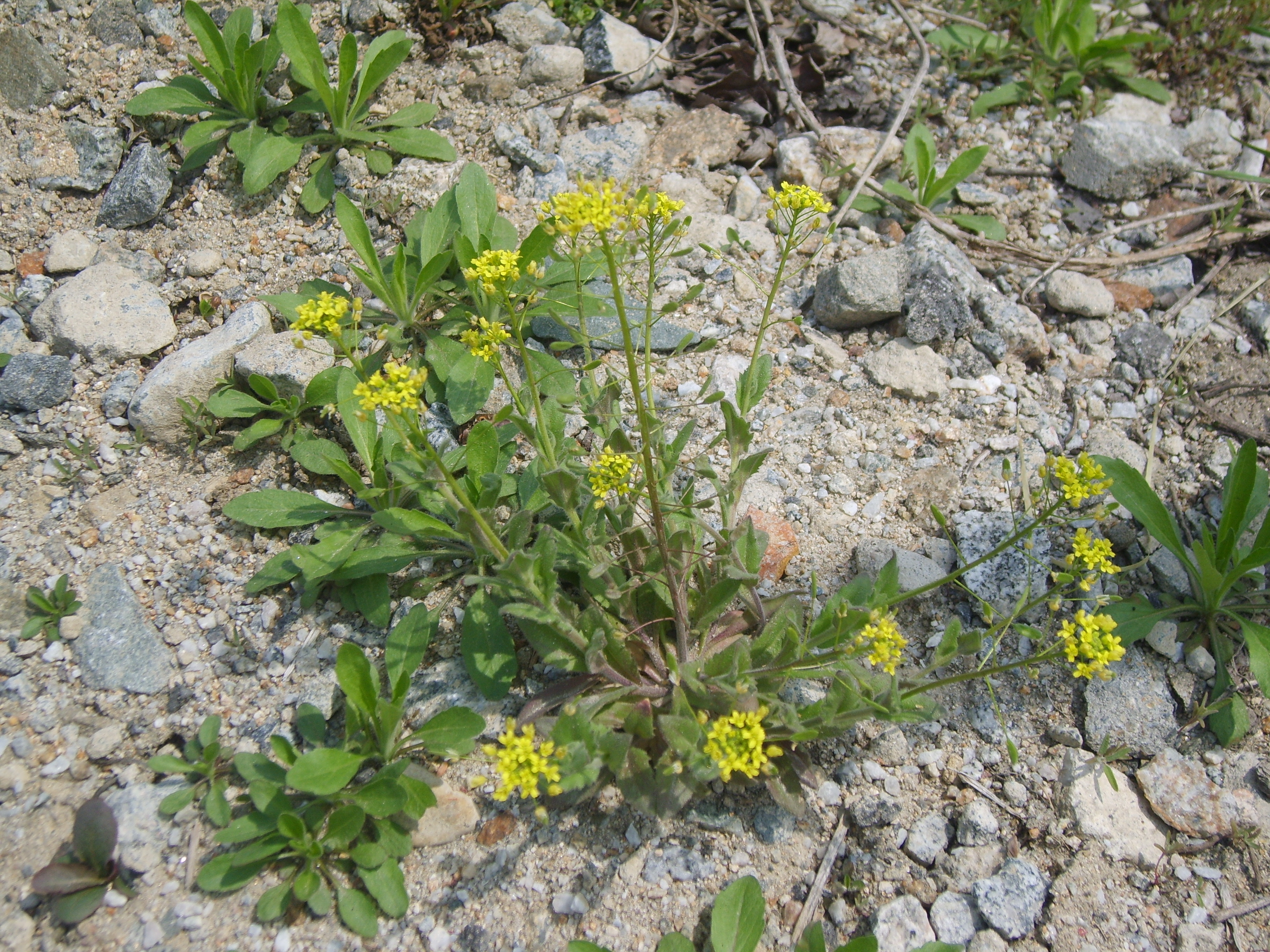
Draba nemorosa

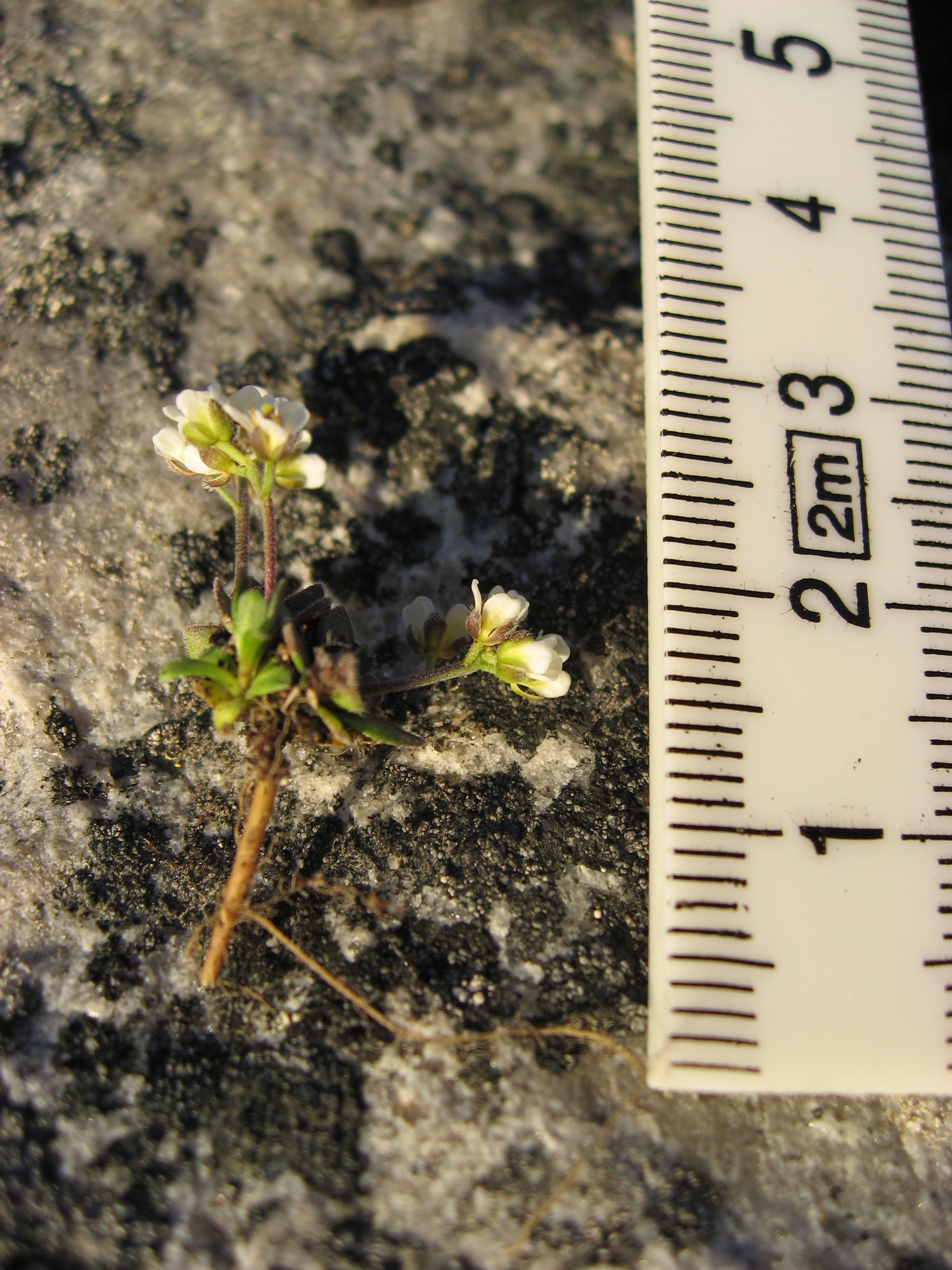
Draba nivalis

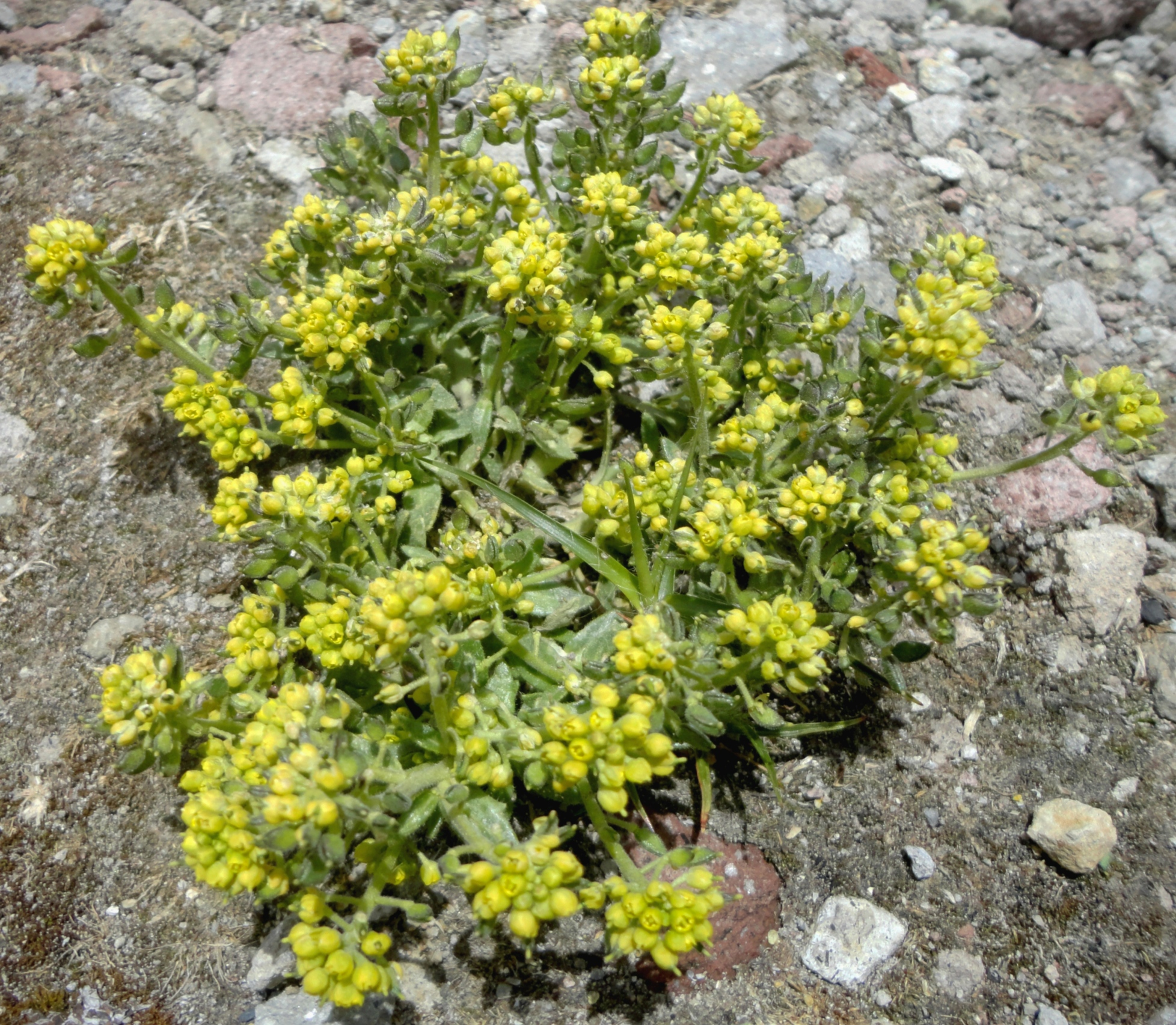
Draba nivicola

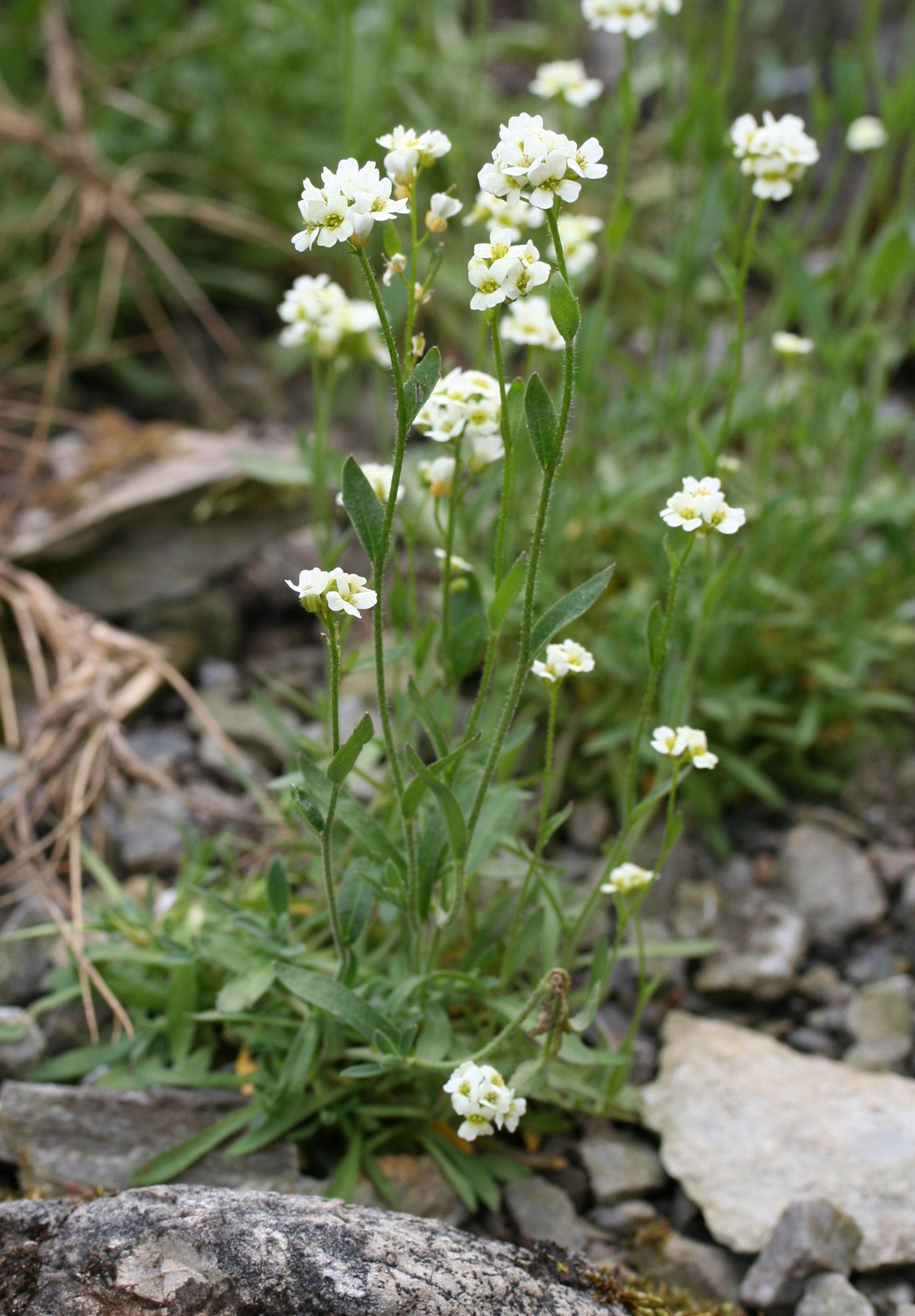
Draba siliquosa

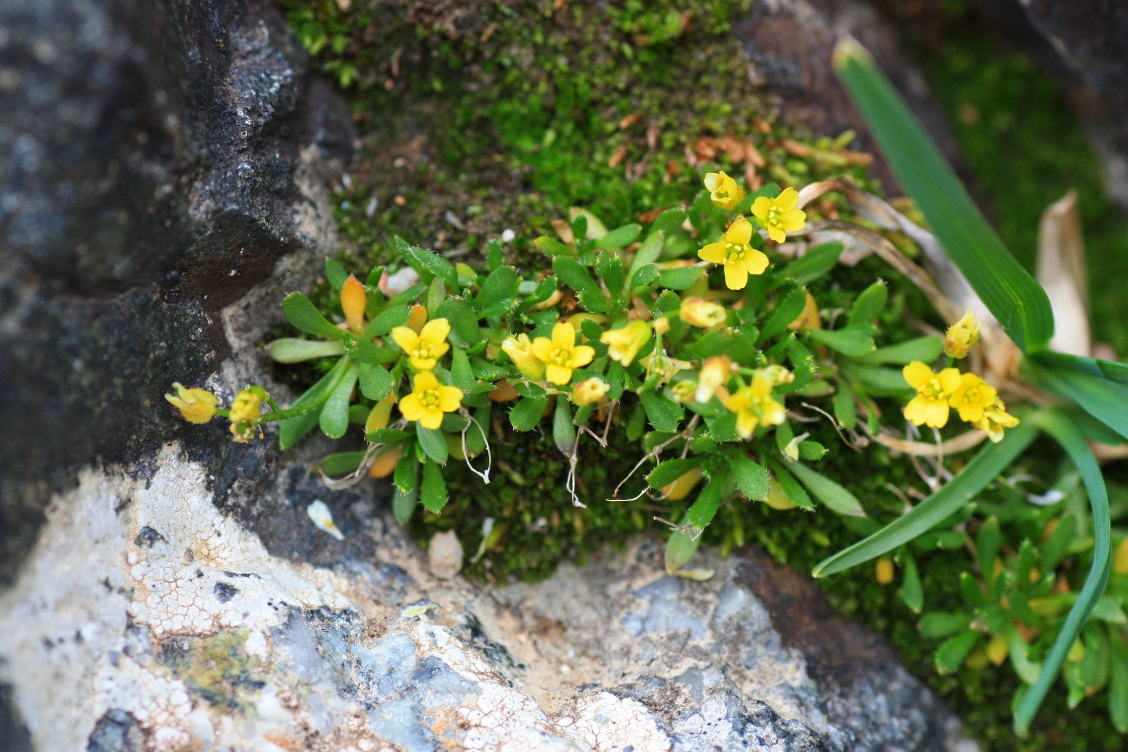
Draba weberi
