= Draba howellii =

Scientific classification
- Kingdom: Plantae
- Clade: Tracheophytes
- Clade: Angiosperms
- Clade: Eudicots
- Clade: Rosids
- Order: Brassicales
- Family: Brassicaceae
- Genus: Draba
- Species: D. howellii

Binomial name
- Draba howellii S.Wats.

Species of flowering plant

Draba howellii is a species of flowering plant in the family Brassicaceae known by the common names rosette draba and Howell's draba. It is endemic to the Klamath Mountains of northern California and southern Oregon, where it grows in rock crevices. This is a tuft-forming perennial herb, sometimes coated in hairs. Most of the leaves are located at the base of the plant, each oval in shape, up to 2.5 centimeters long, and sometimes edged in fine teeth. There may be one or more leaves on the stem as well. The erect inflorescence bears up to 30 yellow mustardlike flowers. The fruit is an oval silique up to a centimeter long containing several seeds.
