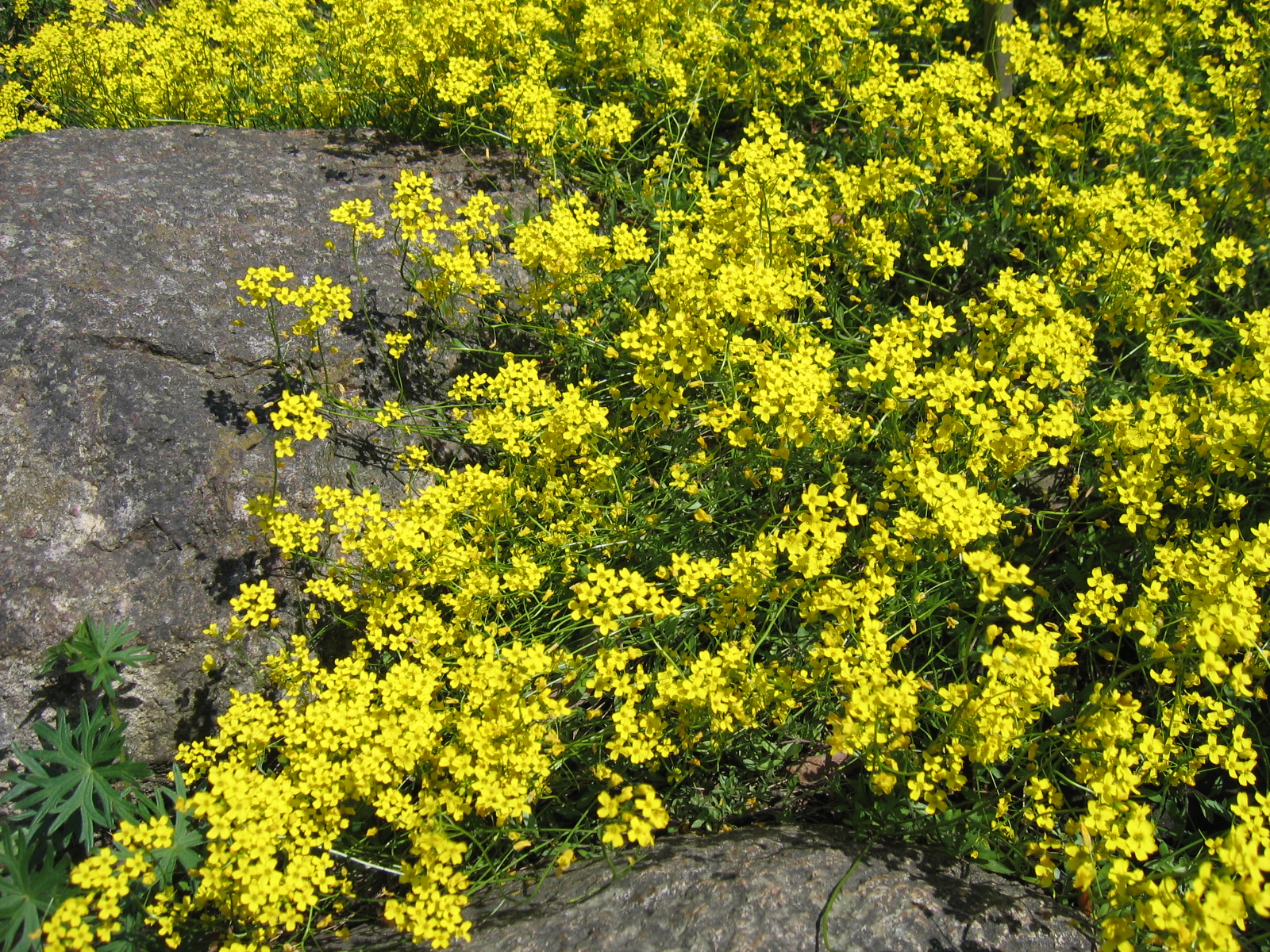

Scientific classification
- Kingdom: Plantae
- Clade: Tracheophytes
- Clade: Angiosperms
- Clade: Eudicots
- Clade: Rosids
- Order: Brassicales
- Family: Brassicaceae
- Genus: Draba
- Species: D. sibirica

Binomial name
- Draba sibirica (Pall.) Thell.

= Draba sibirica =

Species of flowering plant

Draba sibirica is a species of flowering plant belonging to the family Brassicaceae.

Its native range is Greenland, Eastern Europe to Mongolia.
