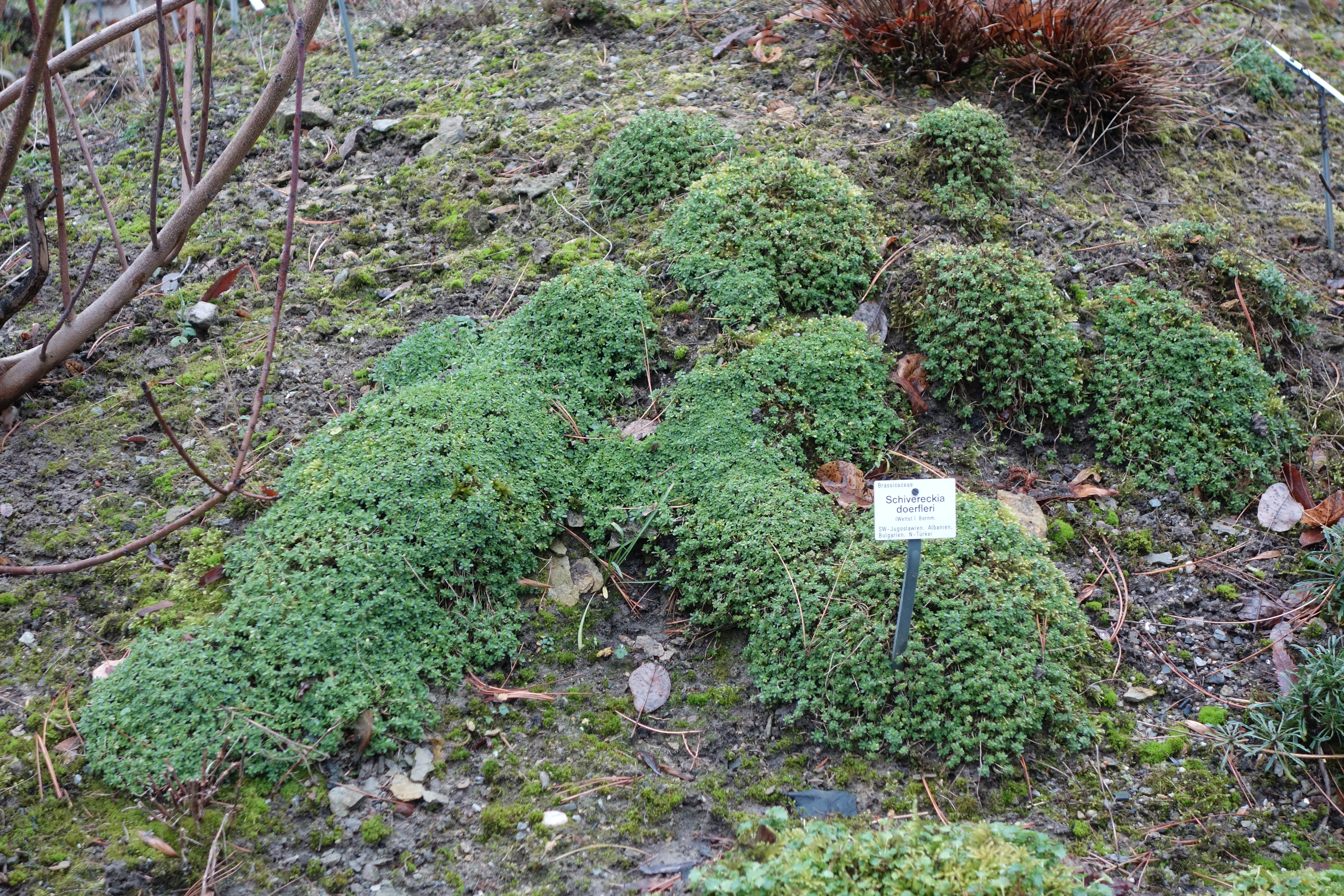

Scientific classification
- Kingdom: Plantae
- Clade: Embryophytes
- Clade: Tracheophytes
- Clade: Angiosperms
- Clade: Eudicots
- Clade: Rosids
- Order: Brassicales
- Family: Brassicaceae
- Genus: Draba
- Species: D. doerfleri

Binomial name
- Draba doerfleri Wettst.

Synonyms
- Alyssum paphlagonicum Bornm.; Draba anatolica A.Duran & Dinç; Schivereckia bornmuelleri Prantl ex Bornm.; Schivereckia doerfleri (Wettst.) Bornm.

= Draba doerfleri =

Species of flowering plant

Draba doerfleri is a species of plant in the family Brassicaceae. It is a subshrub native to North Macedonia, Bulgaria, and north-central Turkey. The species has been recorded in error in Albania, and introduced to Germany.

It grows in mountainous areas and is frequently found in rock crevices.

There are several synonymous names for it.
