= Draba extensa =

Conservation status
- Endangered (IUCN 3.1)

Scientific classification
- Kingdom: Plantae
- Clade: Tracheophytes
- Clade: Angiosperms
- Clade: Eudicots
- Clade: Rosids
- Order: Brassicales
- Family: Brassicaceae
- Genus: Draba
- Species: D. extensa

Binomial name
- Draba extensa Wedd.

Species of flowering plant

Draba extensa is a species of flowering plant in the family Brassicaceae. It is found only in Ecuador. Its natural habitat is rocky areas. It is threatened by habitat loss.
