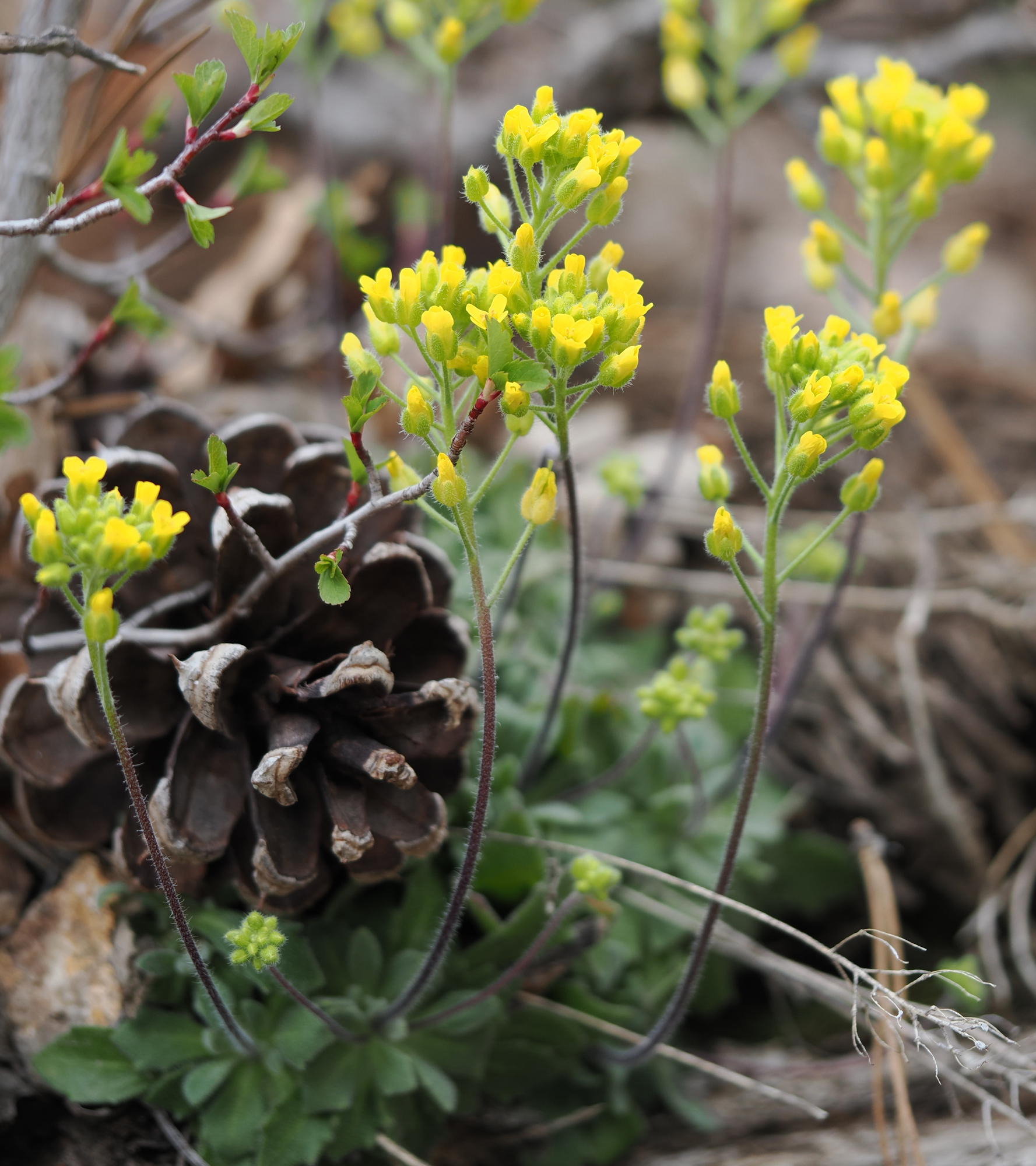

Conservation status
- Vulnerable (NatureServe)

Scientific classification
- Kingdom: Plantae
- Clade: Tracheophytes
- Clade: Angiosperms
- Clade: Eudicots
- Clade: Rosids
- Order: Brassicales
- Family: Brassicaceae
- Genus: Draba
- Species: D. asprella

Binomial name
- Draba asprella Greene

= Draba asprella =

Species of flowering plant

Draba asprella is a species of flowering plant in the mustard family known as rough draba or rough whitlow-grass. It is a small herb with yellow flowers that grows in pine forests in Arizona. Most current treatments recognize two varieties: D. asprella var. asprella and D. asprella var. stelligera.

== Description ==
Draba asprella is a perennial herb that grows in small, low clumps. At its base, the plant has a thickened stem base called a caudex with multiple branches. Around each caudex branch, there is a rosette of obovate leaves, 0.8–4.5 cm long and 2–12 mm wide, which are sessile or borne on very short petioles. The leaf margins are typically smooth but may also be minutely toothed. Small hairs called trichomes cover both the upper and lower faces of the leaves, each 0.2–1.9 mm long; these hairs may be simple or branched, with 2–4 rays.

The inflorescence is borne on an unbranched, leafless stem (4–)6–15(–27) cm in length, also covered in simple or 2–4-rayed trichomes. The flowers, typically 30–75 in number, are arranged in a raceme and are not subtended by bracts. Each flower is yellow, with ovate sepals 1.8–3.5 mm long. The fruit are ovate, hairy, and nearly flat but with inflated bases.

The two varieties of Draba asprella are distinguished by the structure of the hairs on the fruit: D. asprella var. asprella has simple and 2-rayed trichomes 0.3–1 mm long whereas D. asprella var. stelligera has 2–4-rayed trichomes 0.1–0.2 mm long.

== Distribution ==
Draba asprella is endemic to Arizona, where it grows in Apache, Cochise, Coconino, Graham, and Pinal counties, where it grows in shaded sites in pine forests. Its elevational range is 1500- 2400 m. The two varieties are found in different soil types: D. asprella var. asprella grows in soil with igneous rocks, and D. asprella var. stelligera grows in limestone and sandstone outcrops.

== Taxonomy ==
Edward Lee Greene formally described Draba asprella in 1883, designating a type specimen collected earlier that year by Henry Hurd Rusby near Lynx Creek, Arizona. In 1927, Otto Eugen Schulz described the variety D. asprella var. stelligera.

In his 1941 monograph on the genus Draba, Charles Leo Hitchcock described another variety, D. asprella var. kaibabensis, differing from var. stelligera in trichome characters; more recent treatments such as the Flora of North America treat var. kaibabensis as a synonym of var. stelligera based on the variability of the purported differences trichome densities and proportions. Some authors have treated the species D. zionensis as a variety of D. asprella, namely D. asprella var. zionensis, but most authorities currently consider it a distinct species more closely related to D. sobolifera and D. subalpina.
