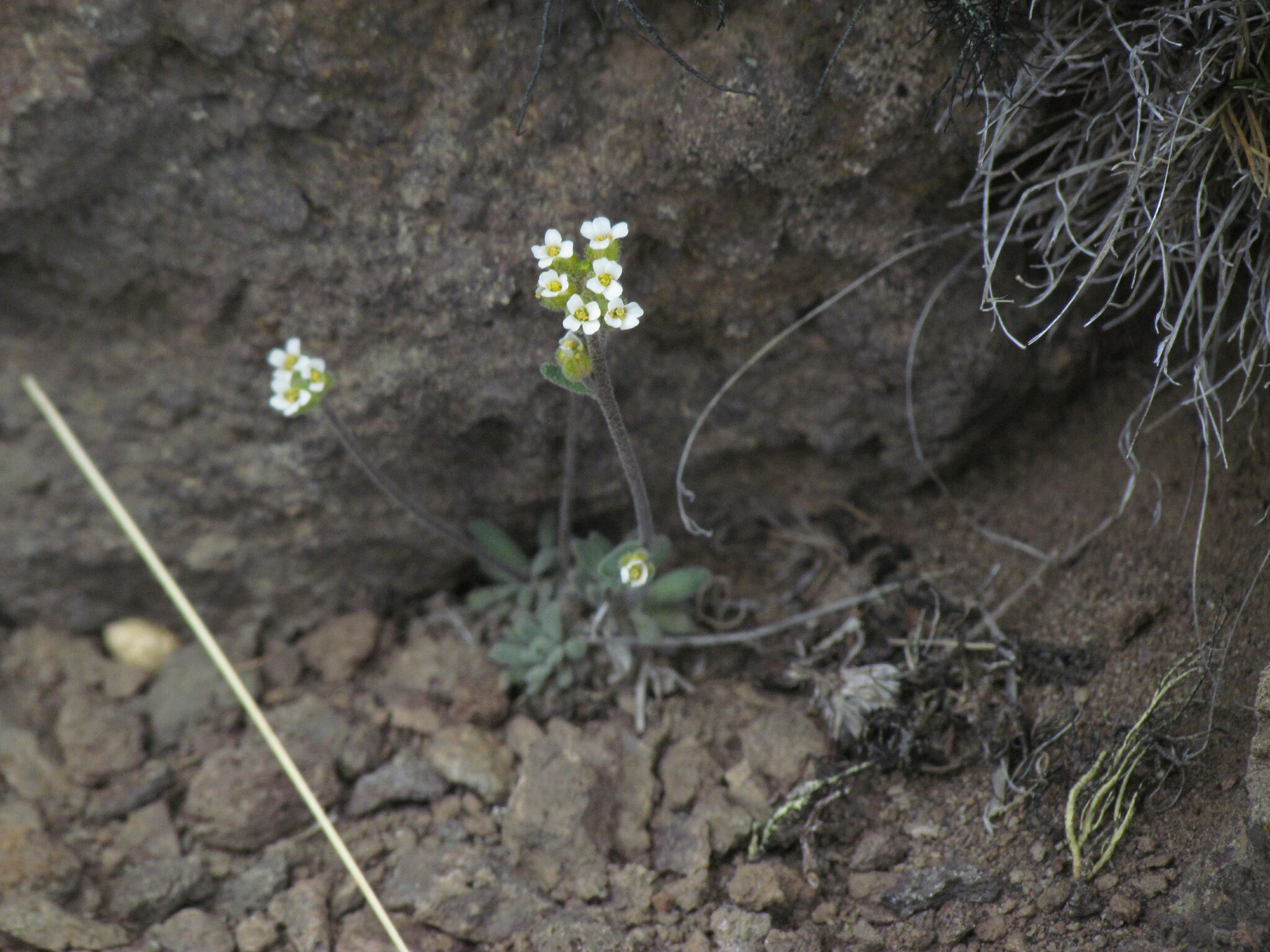

Scientific classification
- Kingdom: Plantae
- Clade: Tracheophytes
- Clade: Angiosperms
- Clade: Eudicots
- Clade: Rosids
- Order: Brassicales
- Family: Brassicaceae
- Genus: Draba
- Species: D. magellanica

Binomial name
- Draba magellanica Lam.

= Draba magellanica =

Species of plant

Draba magellanica is a species of flowering plant in the family Brassicaceae. It is native to southern Chile, Argentina and the Falkland Islands.
