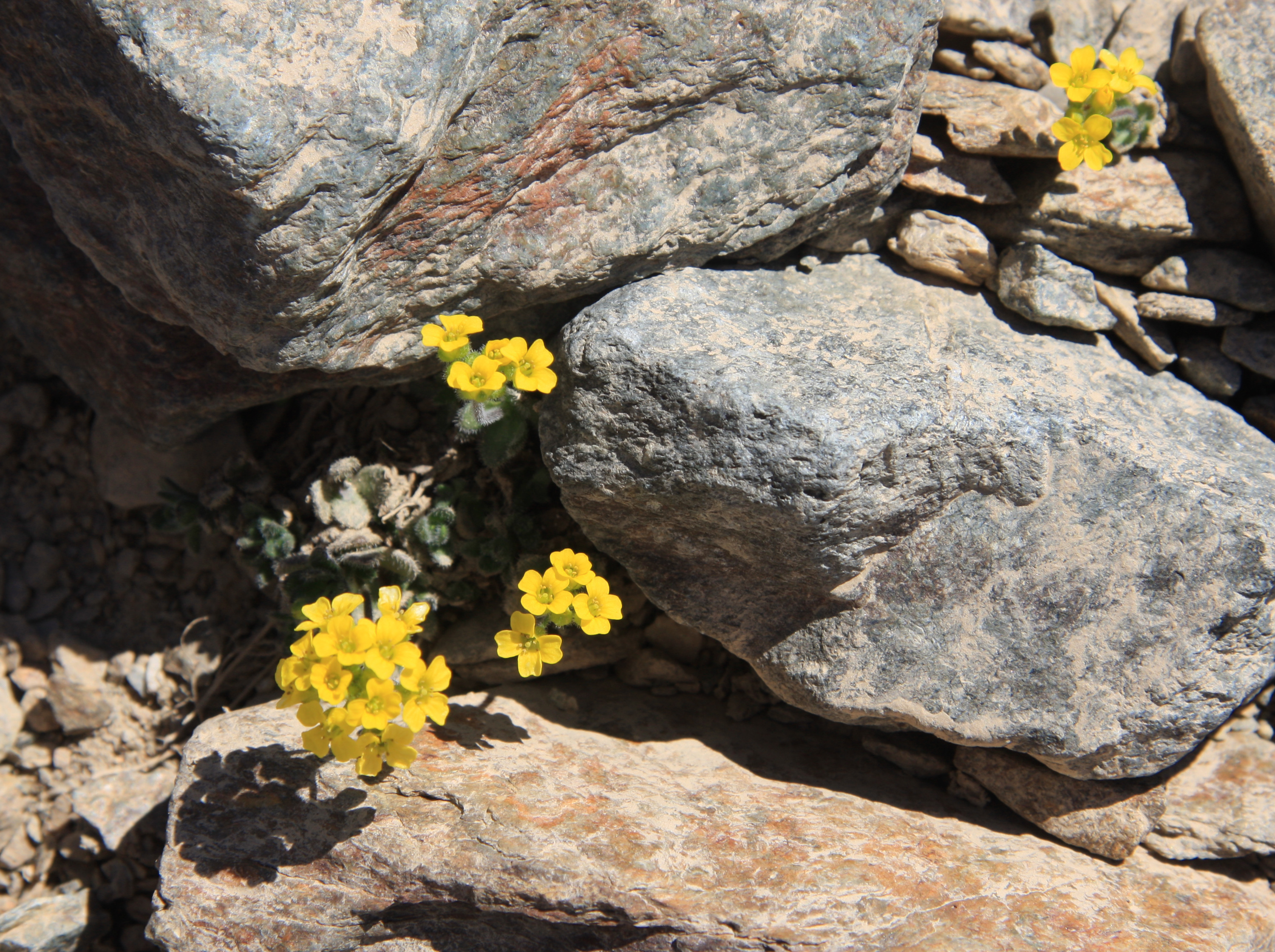

Scientific classification
- Kingdom: Plantae
- Clade: Tracheophytes
- Clade: Angiosperms
- Clade: Eudicots
- Clade: Rosids
- Order: Brassicales
- Family: Brassicaceae
- Genus: Draba
- Species: D. lemmonii

Binomial name
- Draba lemmonii S.Watson

= Draba lemmonii =

Species of flowering plant

Draba lemmonii is a perennial plant in the family Brassicaceae found in the high elevation United States Sierra Nevada range, commonly known as Lemmon's draba.

== Growth pattern ==
It is a hairy mat forming perennial growing to 6 inches (15 cm).

== Habitat and range ==
It grows in crevices, talus, and rocky meadows of the subalpine forest and alpine zone of the United States Sierra Nevada range.

== Leaves and stems ==
Basal leaves are obovate, up to 1 inch (2.5 cm), and hairy on both sides.

== Inflorescence and fruit ==
The flower stalk has up to 30 small, yellow, 4 petalled flowers on top in July of August.
