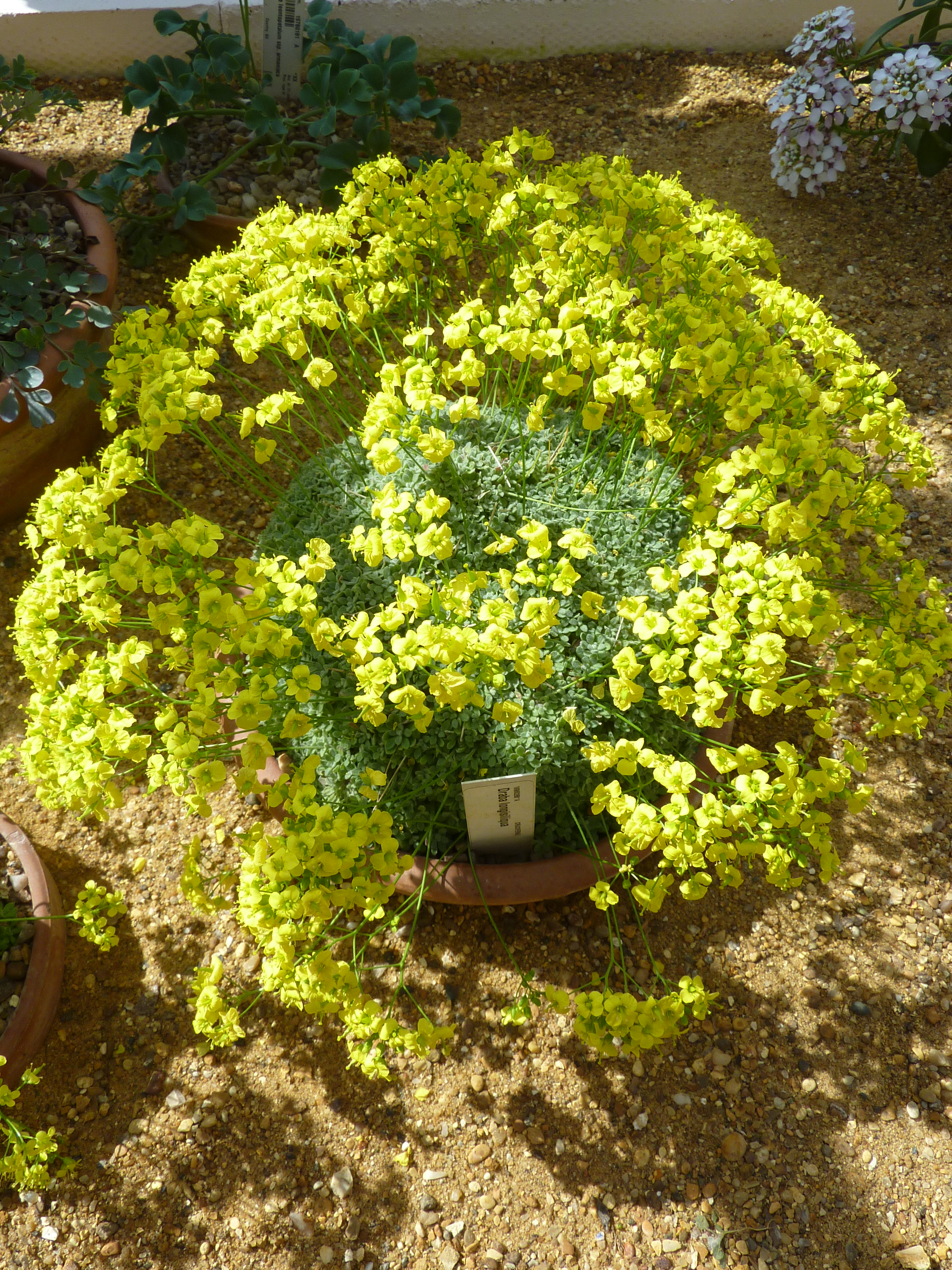
- Draba longisiliqua, Cambridge Botanic Garden

Scientific classification
- Kingdom: Plantae
- Clade: Tracheophytes
- Clade: Angiosperms
- Clade: Eudicots
- Clade: Rosids
- Order: Brassicales
- Family: Brassicaceae
- Genus: Draba
- Species: D. longisiliqua

Binomial name
- Draba longisiliqua Schmalh. ex Akinf.

= Draba longisiliqua =

Species of flowering plant

Draba longisiliqua, the long-podded whitlow grass, is a species of flowering plant in the family Brassicaceae, native to the Caucasus. Despite its common name, it does not resemble, nor is it related to, the true grasses. It is a low-growing evergreen perennial growing to 9 cm (4 in) tall by 25 cm (10 in) wide, forming a cushion of hairy grey leaves with masses of yellow flowers in spring. It is usually grown in an alpine house or scree bed, as it requires excellent drainage and protection from winter wet. The plant is also known to thrive in tufa. It has gained the Royal Horticultural Society's Award of Garden Merit.

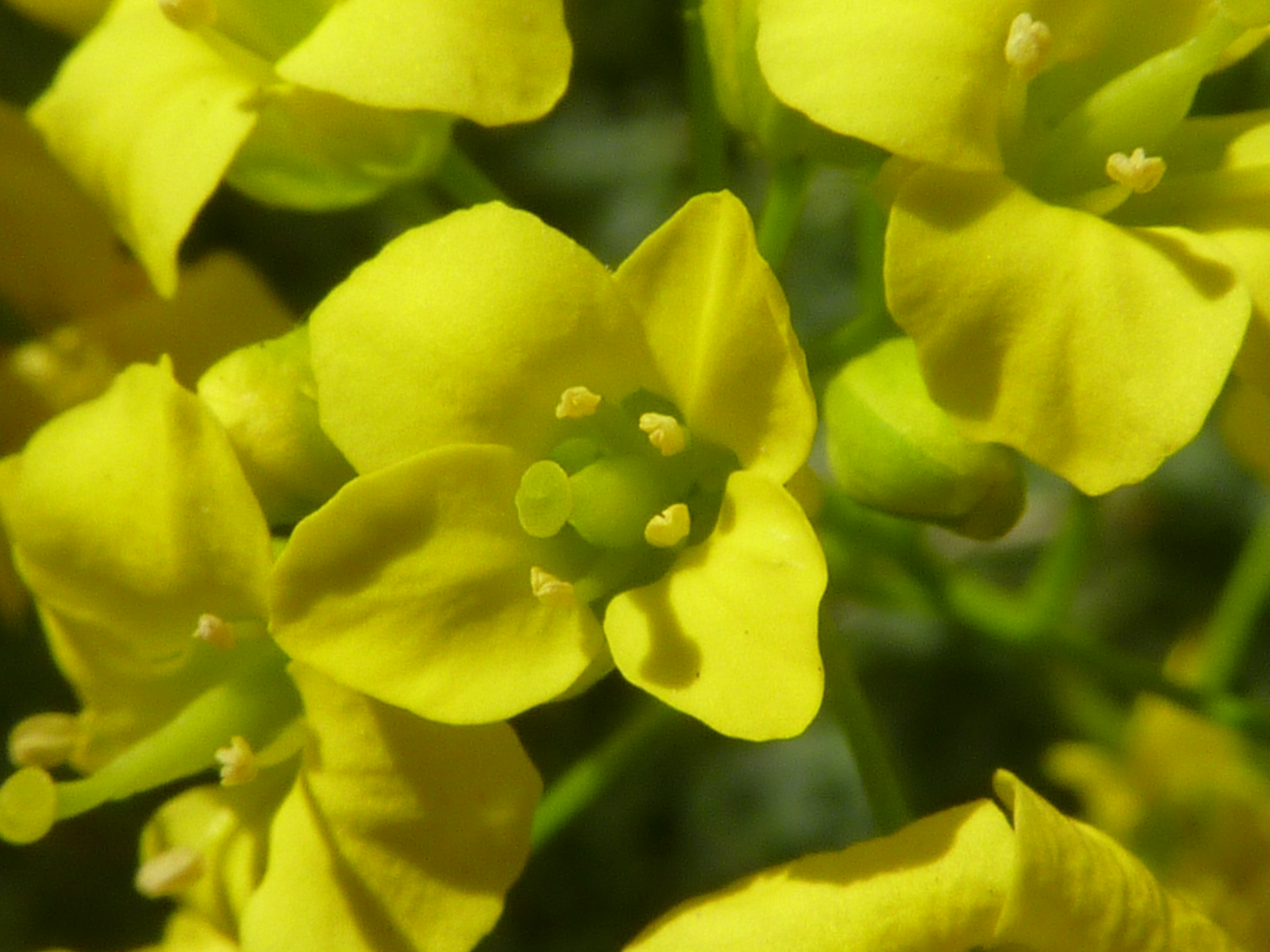
