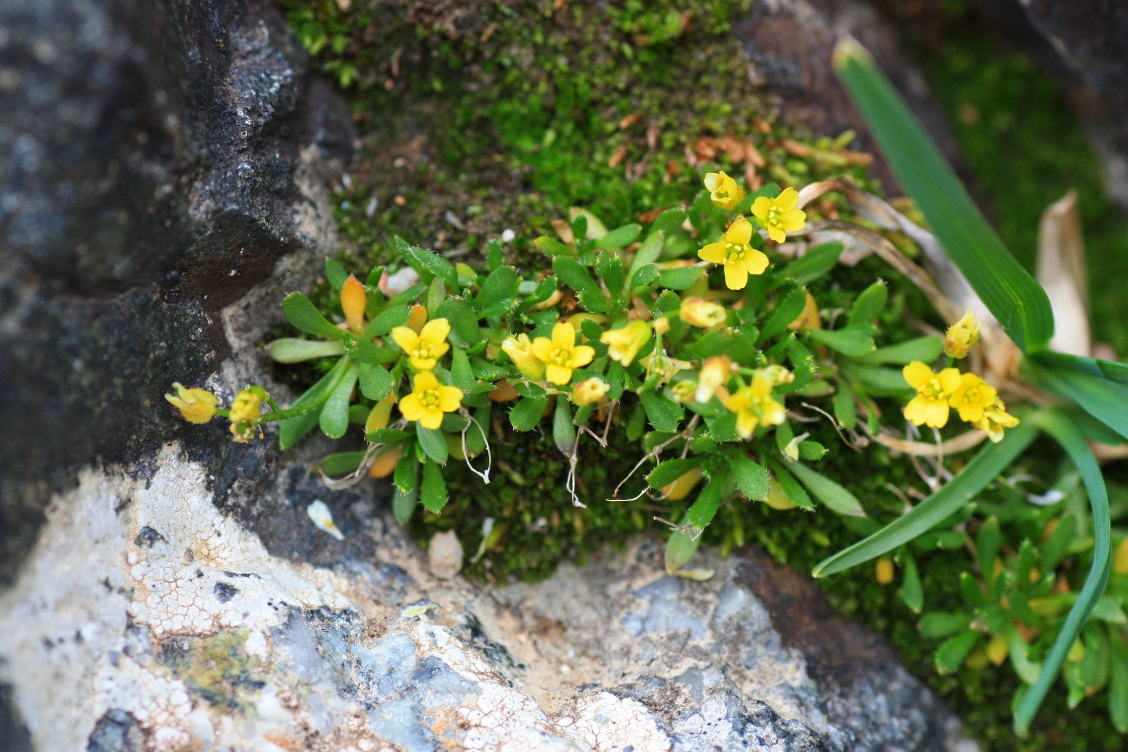

Conservation status
- Critically Imperiled (NatureServe)

Scientific classification
- Kingdom: Plantae
- Clade: Embryophytes
- Clade: Tracheophytes
- Clade: Spermatophytes
- Clade: Angiosperms
- Clade: Eudicots
- Clade: Rosids
- Order: Brassicales
- Family: Brassicaceae
- Genus: Draba
- Species: D. weberi

Binomial name
- Draba weberi Price & Rollins

= Draba weberi =

Species of flowering plant

Draba weberi is a species of flowering plant in the family Brassicaceae known by the common names Weber's whitlow-grass and Weber's draba. It is narrowly endemic to Summit and Park Counties, Colorado, where several populations were estimated to total to approximately 300 individuals as of 2012. D. weberi is principally threatened by alterations to its hydrologic environment, owing to its preference for wet, rocky streamside crevices.

Draba weberi is a perennial herb which grows in small, dense tufts with pubescent stems 2 to 6 centimeters long. Flowering occurs from June to July, whereupon five to 15 small yellow flowers are produced per stem. Along with several other members of the genus Draba, D. weberi produces sterile pollen and reproduces asexually through agamospermy. Consequently, its seeds are formed without fertilization and carry only maternal genes.
