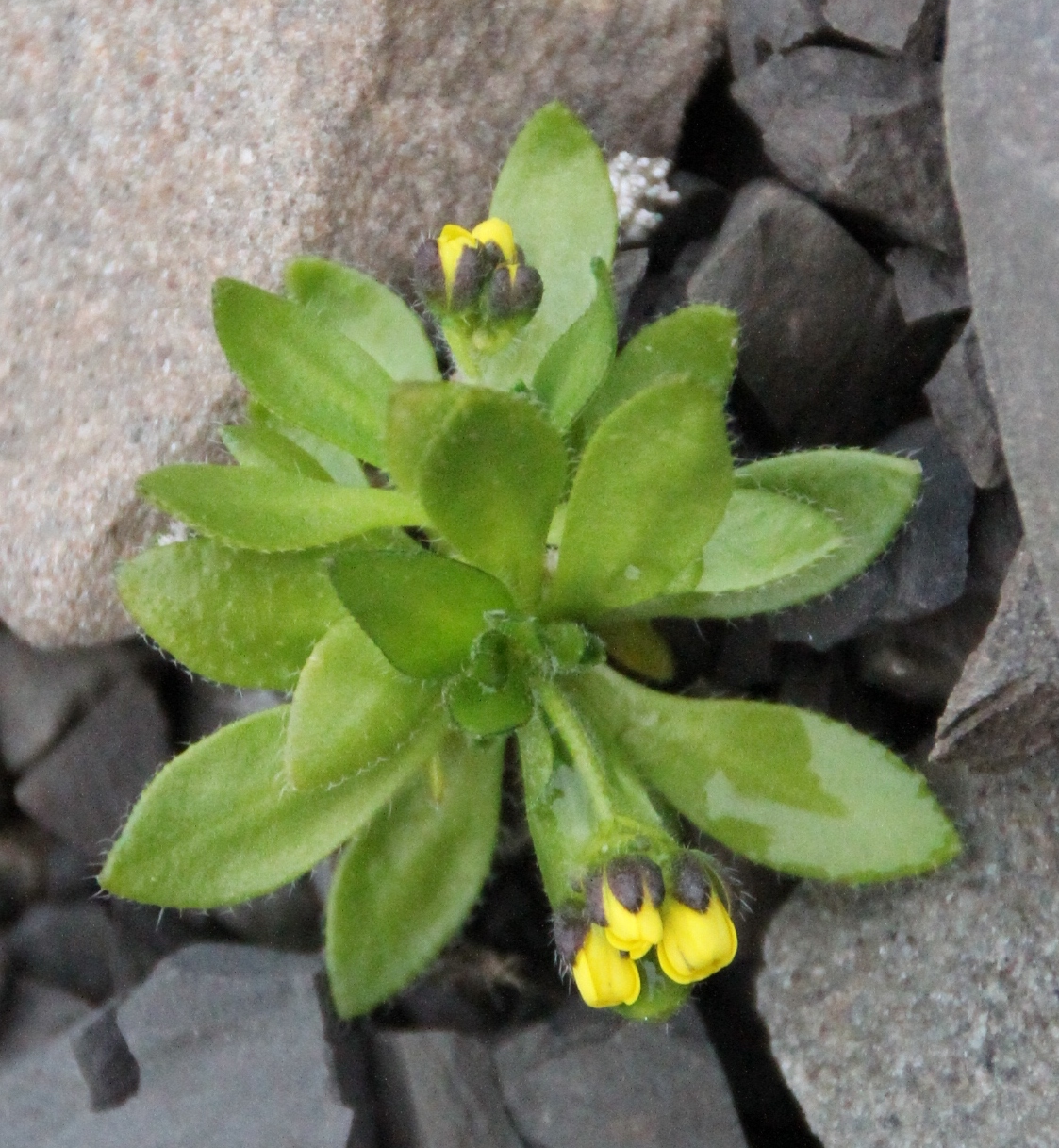

Scientific classification
- Kingdom: Plantae
- Clade: Tracheophytes
- Clade: Angiosperms
- Clade: Eudicots
- Clade: Rosids
- Order: Brassicales
- Family: Brassicaceae
- Genus: Draba
- Species: D. corymbosa

Binomial name
- Draba corymbosa R.Br. ex DC.

= Draba corymbosa =

Species of flowering plant

Draba corymbosa, also scientifically referred to as Draba corymbosa R. Br. ex DC., and commonly known as Flat-top Whitlowgrass and Drave en corymbe (FR) is a species of flowering plant native to Subarctic belonging to the family Brassicaceae.

== Description ==
D. corymbosa is a perennial herb in the mustard family that grows up to 15 cm (6 in) in height. The colour of the flower is yellow, blooming from June to August. This vascular plant is native to the Arctic and Tundra ecozones, including Alaska, northern Canada, Greenland, Svalbard, and Russia. This species reproduces sexually via seeds.

Synonyms:

- Draba bellii Holm
