= Draba subumbellata =

Scientific classification
- Kingdom: Plantae
- Clade: Tracheophytes
- Clade: Angiosperms
- Clade: Eudicots
- Clade: Rosids
- Order: Brassicales
- Family: Brassicaceae
- Genus: Draba
- Species: D. subumbellata

Binomial name
- Draba subumbellata Rollins & Price

Species of flowering plant

Draba subumbellata is a species of flowering plant in the family Brassicaceae known by several common names, including parasol draba, mound draba, and White Mountains cushion draba. This small perennial plant is native to the White Mountains which straddle the California-Nevada state line and the Inyo Mountains nearby. It lives on barren rocky scree above 3000 meters.

This alpine-adapted plant forms cushion-like mats amongst the rock litter on mountain peaks. Its tiny leaves are covered in bushy hairs. At flowering small bunches of tiny buds open to reveal bright yellow petals each a few millimeters wide. The fruits are hairy, slightly inflated siliques less than a centimeter long.
