= Draba caswellii =

Scientific classification
- Kingdom: Plantae
- Clade: Tracheophytes
- Clade: Angiosperms
- Clade: Eudicots
- Clade: Rosids
- Order: Brassicales
- Family: Brassicaceae
- Genus: Draba
- Species: D. caswellii

Binomial name
- Draba caswellii G.A.Mulligan & Al-Shehbaz

Species of plant

Draba caswellii, also known as Caswell's draba, is a species of plant of the Draba genus. It is endemic to the Kluane National Park in the alpine tundra on the Yukon, Canada. It is listed as critically imperiled by NatureServe. Most closely resembles D. porsildii, it differs by having soft, crisped trichomes throughout.
