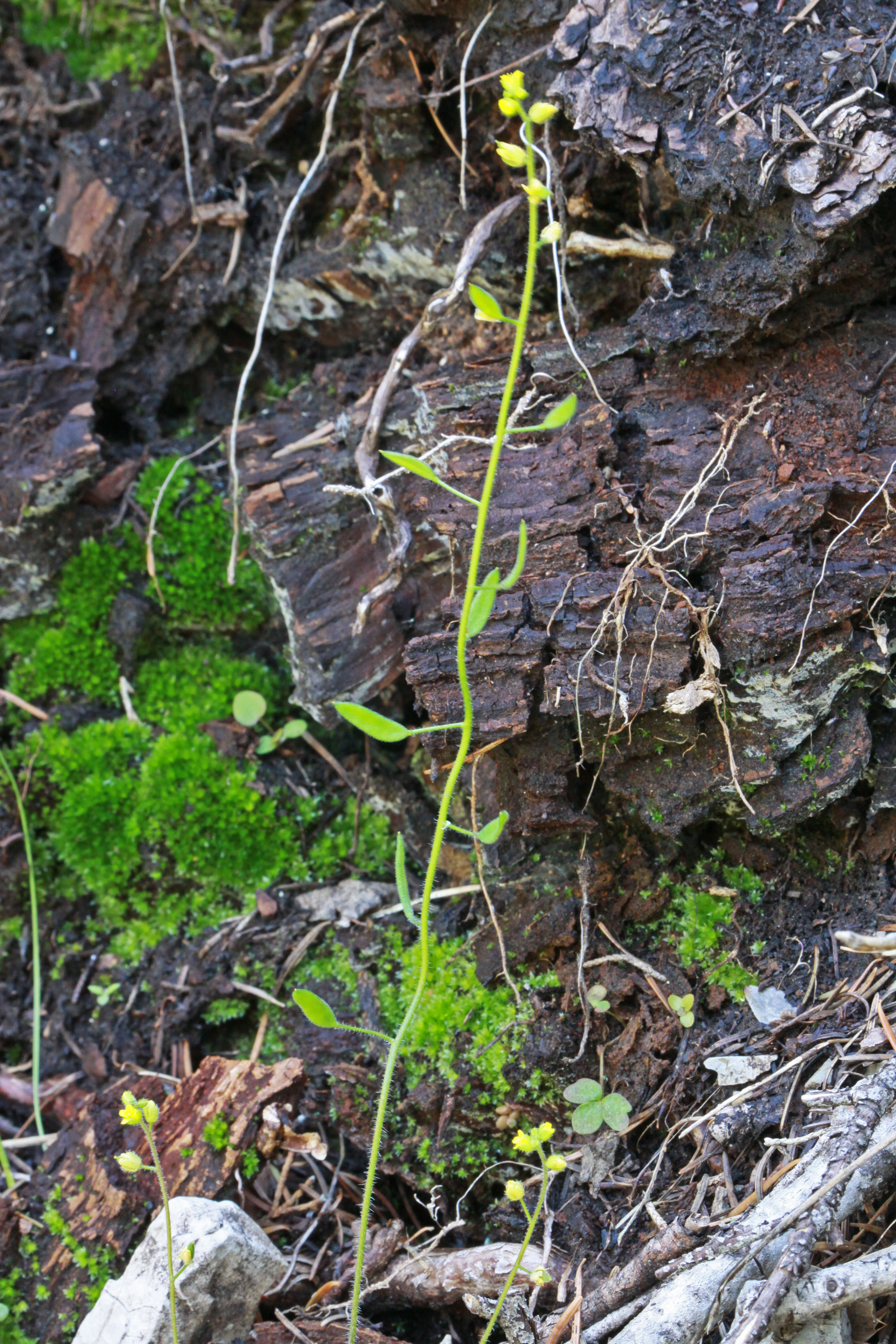

Conservation status
- Secure (NatureServe)

Scientific classification
- Kingdom: Plantae
- Clade: Tracheophytes
- Clade: Angiosperms
- Clade: Eudicots
- Clade: Rosids
- Order: Brassicales
- Family: Brassicaceae
- Genus: Draba
- Species: D. albertina

Binomial name
- Draba albertina Greene

Synonyms
- Draba nitida

= Draba albertina =

Species of flowering plant

Draba albertina is a species of flowering plant in the mustard family known as the Arc dome draba, slender draba or slender whitlow-grass.

== Description ==
Draba albertina is a plant that may grow as a short-lived perennial or a biennial plant, but most often is an annual plant. When full grown they range in size from 3–42 centimeters, but most often will be 5–30 cm tall. The stems may be simple or have branches towards their ends while having short, soft hairs covering the lower portions, and may be similarly pubescent or hairless towards their ends.

The leaves are mostly found at the base of the plant and may either have leaves on the stems or they may be absent. The basal leaves are attached to the plant by short stems and range in length from just 0.3 centimeters to as much as 3.5 cm. The surfaces of the leaves are also usually pubescent. Plants usually have one to three cauline leaves directly attached to the stems (sessile), but may occasionally lack them or have as many as five.

The stem bears an inflorescence with two to thirty small yellow flowers. The fruit is a silique, a type of narrow pod made up of two fused carpels, most often ranging in length from 6–12 millimeters, but occasionally as short as short as 4 mm or as long as 15 mm.

== Distribution ==
This plant is native to western North America, where it grows at high elevations from Arizona to Alaska and northern Canada. Like many species of Draba, it can grow in alpine and Arctic climates.
