= Draba obovata =

Conservation status
- Near Threatened (IUCN 3.1)

Scientific classification
- Kingdom: Plantae
- Clade: Tracheophytes
- Clade: Angiosperms
- Clade: Eudicots
- Clade: Rosids
- Order: Brassicales
- Family: Brassicaceae
- Genus: Draba
- Species: D. obovata

Binomial name
- Draba obovata Benth.

Species of flowering plant

Draba obovata is a species of plant in the family Brassicaceae. It is endemic to Ecuador. Its natural habitats are subtropical or tropical high-altitude grassland and rocky areas. It is an IUCN Red List Near threatened species, threatened by habitat loss.
