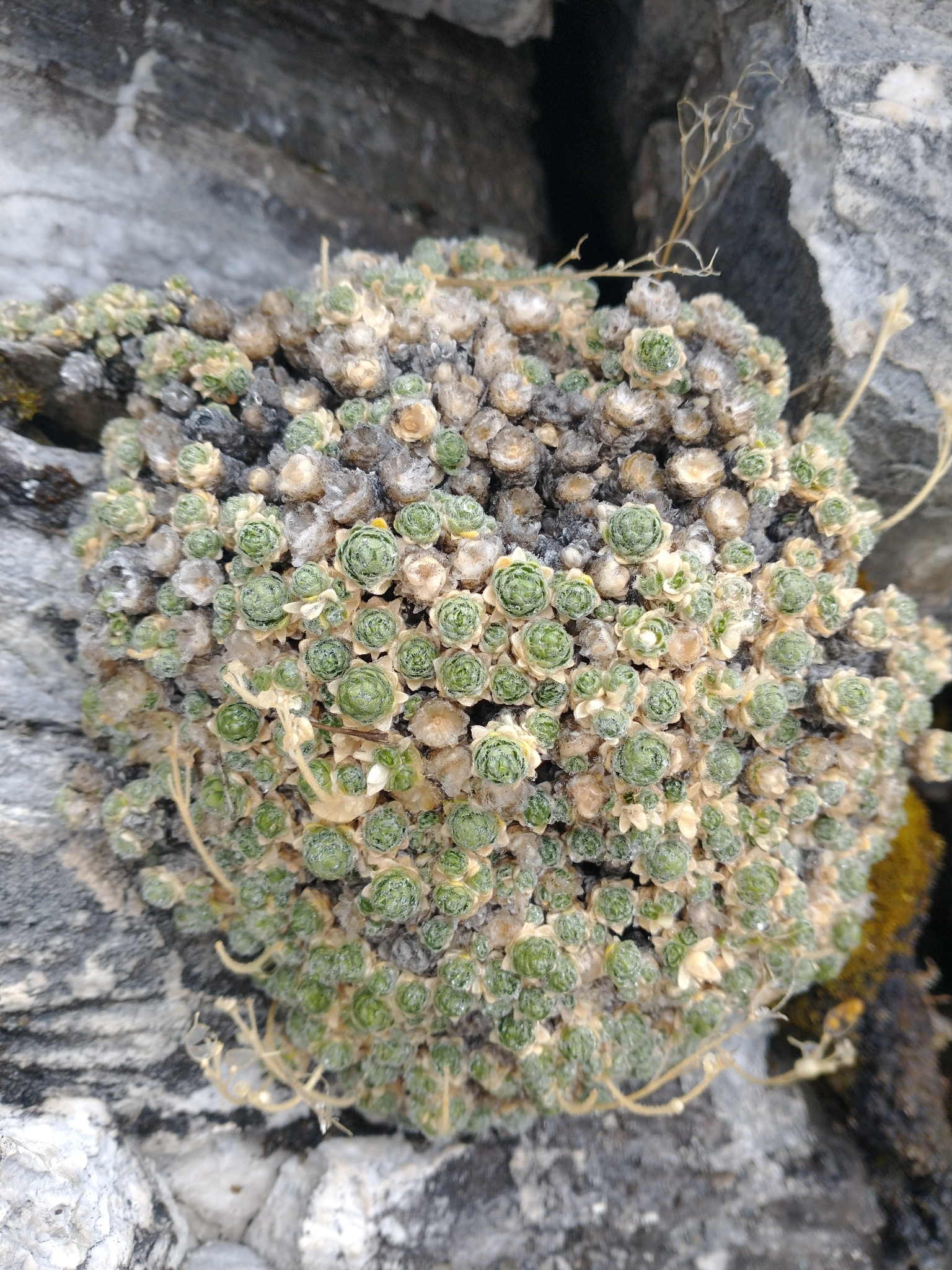

Scientific classification
- Kingdom: Plantae
- Clade: Tracheophytes
- Clade: Angiosperms
- Clade: Eudicots
- Clade: Rosids
- Order: Brassicales
- Family: Brassicaceae
- Genus: Draba
- Species: D. pterosperma

Binomial name
- Draba pterosperma Payson

= Draba pterosperma =

Species of flowering plant

Draba pterosperma is an uncommon species of flowering plant in the family Brassicaceae known by the common name wingedseed draba. It is endemic to Siskiyou County, California, where it is known only from the Marble and Salmon Mountains of the Klamath Range. It is a small perennial herb forming dense mats or cushions of hairy, oval-shaped leaves each no more than a centimeter long. The erect inflorescence bears several white flowers that yield flat oval-shaped siliques containing winged seeds.
