= Draba sierrae =

Scientific classification
- Kingdom: Plantae
- Clade: Tracheophytes
- Clade: Angiosperms
- Clade: Eudicots
- Clade: Rosids
- Order: Brassicales
- Family: Brassicaceae
- Genus: Draba
- Species: D. sierrae

Binomial name
- Draba sierrae Sharsm.

Species of flowering plant

Draba sierrae is an uncommon species of flowering plant in the family Brassicaceae known by the common name Sierra draba. It is endemic to the central Sierra Nevada of California, where it is known from just a few occurrences in rocky alpine habitat. It is a perennial herb forming small, dense cushions of very hairy, oblong or lance-shaped grayish leaves each under centimeter long. The erect inflorescence bears several yellow flowers. The fruit is a flat, twisted, oval-shaped silique under a centimeter long containing a few unwinged seeds.
