= Draba cruciata =

Scientific classification
- Kingdom: Plantae
- Clade: Tracheophytes
- Clade: Angiosperms
- Clade: Eudicots
- Clade: Rosids
- Order: Brassicales
- Family: Brassicaceae
- Genus: Draba
- Species: D. cruciata

Binomial name
- Draba cruciata Payson

Species of flowering plant

Draba cruciata is a species of flowering plant in the family Brassicaceae known as the Mineral King draba. This is an uncommon plant endemic to California, where it is known only from the Sierra Nevada in Tulare County. It was named for Mineral King, a historic valley in the area. This plant is a squat, mat-forming perennial adapted to high mountain climates. It has small paddle-shaped leaves covered in a thick coat of hairs. It bears an inflorescence of 5 to 20 yellow flowers, each flower about a centimeter across. The stem bears widely spaced fruits, which are siliques about a centimeter long each.
