= Draba yukonensis =

Scientific classification
- Kingdom: Plantae
- Clade: Tracheophytes
- Clade: Angiosperms
- Clade: Eudicots
- Clade: Rosids
- Order: Brassicales
- Family: Brassicaceae
- Genus: Draba
- Species: D. yukonensis

Binomial name
- Draba yukonensis A.E.Porsild

Species of flowering plant

Draba yukonensis, also known as the Yukon draba or the Yukon whitlow-grass, is a species of plant of the Draba genus. It is endemic to the Yukon, Canada. It is listed as imperiled by NatureServe.
