= Draba cacuminum =

Scientific classification
- Kingdom: Plantae
- Clade: Tracheophytes
- Clade: Angiosperms
- Clade: Eudicots
- Clade: Rosids
- Order: Brassicales
- Family: Brassicaceae
- Genus: Draba
- Species: D. cacuminum

Binomial name
- Draba cacuminum E.Ekman

Species of flowering plant

Draba cacuminum is a species of flowering plant belonging to the family Brassicaceae.

It is native to Norway.
