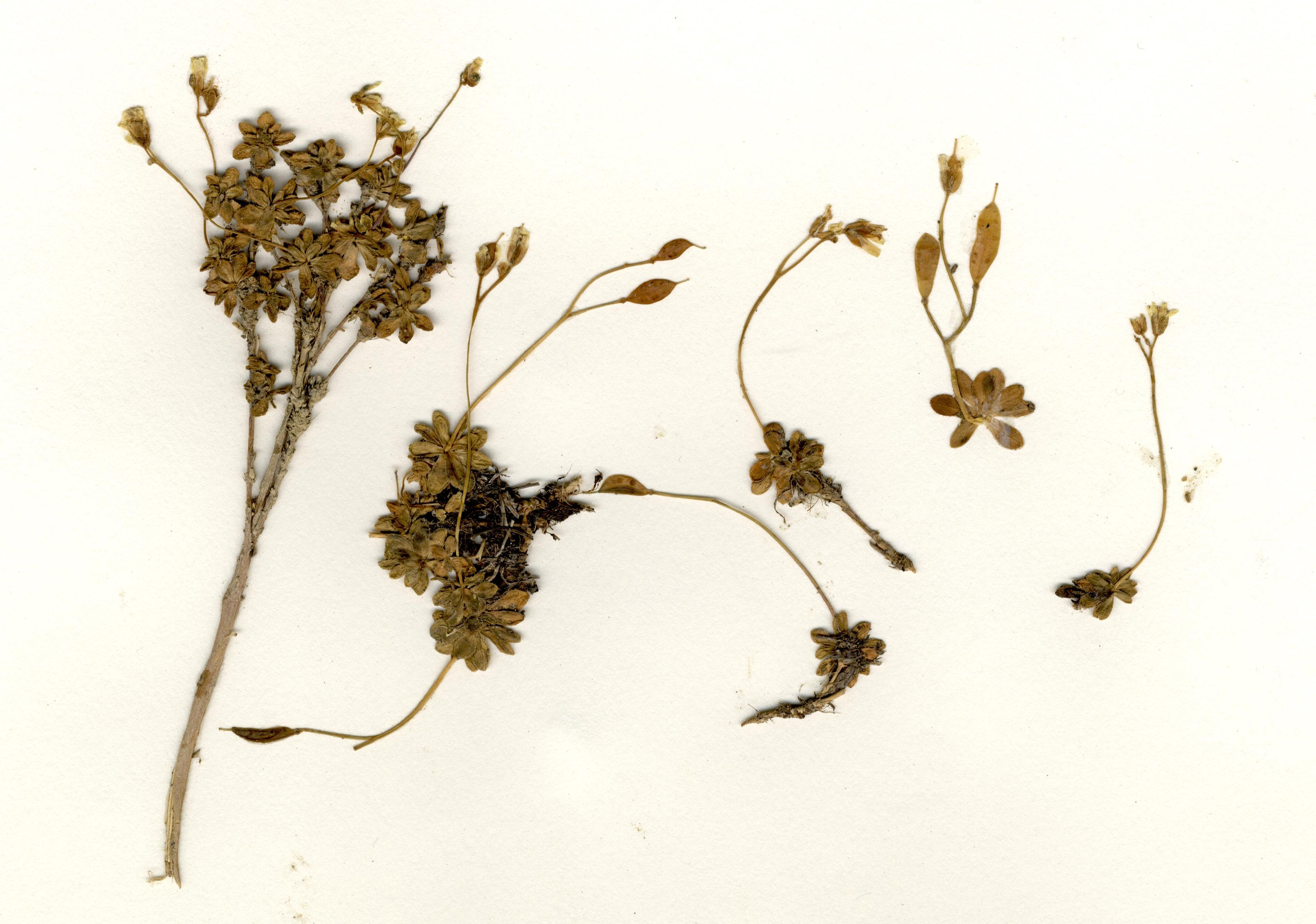
- Herbarium specimen

Conservation status
- Imperiled (NatureServe)

Scientific classification
- Kingdom: Plantae
- Clade: Tracheophytes
- Clade: Angiosperms
- Clade: Eudicots
- Clade: Rosids
- Order: Brassicales
- Family: Brassicaceae
- Genus: Draba
- Species: D. carnosula

Binomial name
- Draba carnosula O.E.Schulz

= Draba carnosula =

Species of flowering plant

Draba carnosula is a rare species of flowering plant in the family Brassicaceae known by the common name Mt. Eddy draba. It is endemic to the Klamath Mountains of far northern California, where it is known from fewer than forty occurrences at Mount Eddy and other peaks in the range. This is a perennial herb forming small clumps in serpentine outcrops. The leaves are located at the base of the plant, each an oval shape under a centimeter long. They are mostly hairless, except for long hairs along the edges. The erect inflorescence bears fewer than 10 yellow mustardlike flowers. The fruit is a lance-shaped silique one or two centimeters long, containing several winged seeds.
