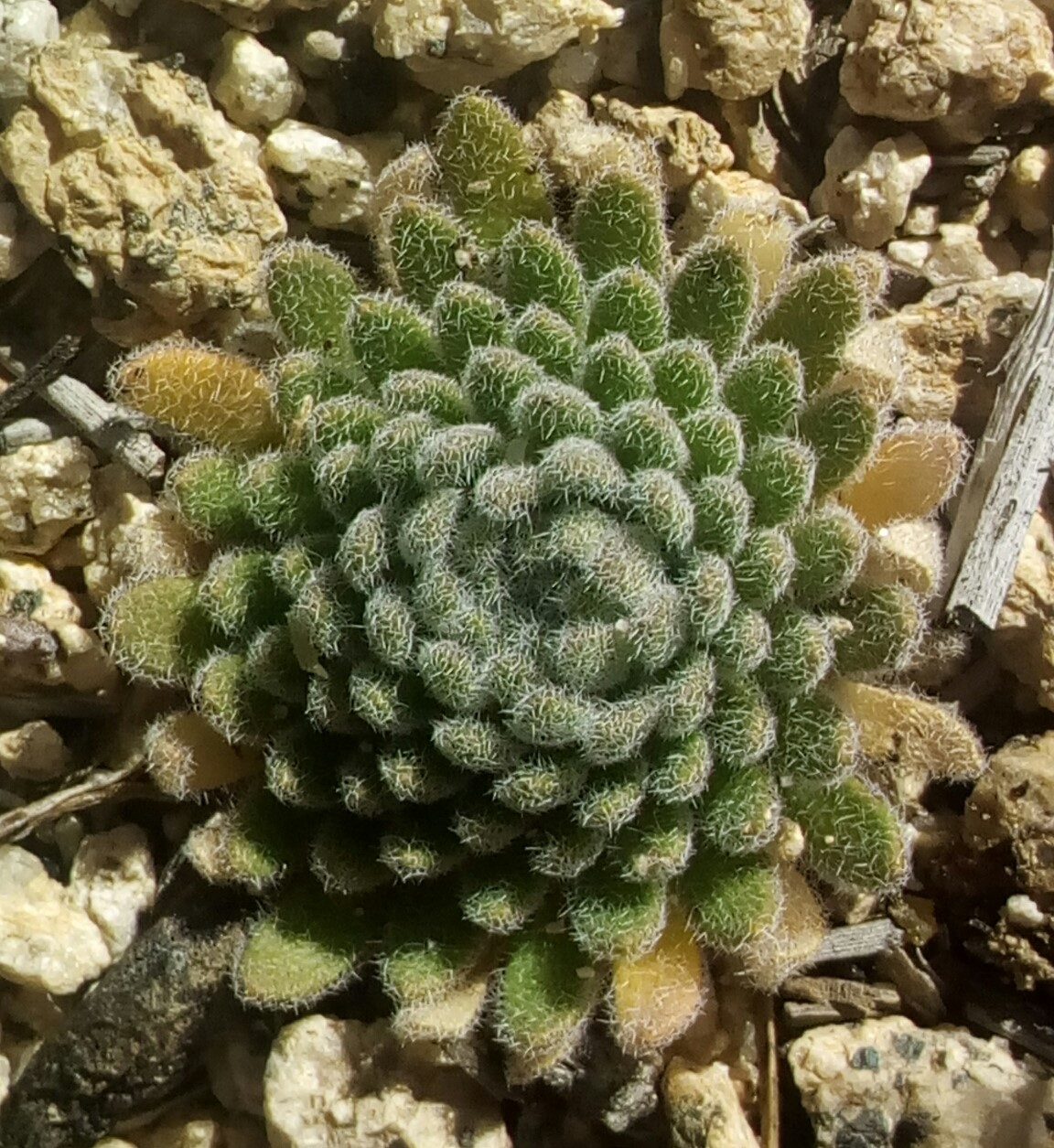

Conservation status
- Imperiled (NatureServe)

Scientific classification
- Kingdom: Plantae
- Clade: Tracheophytes
- Clade: Angiosperms
- Clade: Eudicots
- Clade: Rosids
- Order: Brassicales
- Family: Brassicaceae
- Genus: Draba
- Species: D. corrugata

Binomial name
- Draba corrugata S.Wats.

= Draba corrugata =

Species of flowering plant

Draba corrugata, commonly known as Southern California draba, is a species of flowering plant in the family Brassicaceae. It is native to the eastern Transverse Ranges of southern California, and the Peninsular Ranges of Southern California and Baja California. It grows in rocky areas.

== Description ==
Draba corrugata is a biennial or perennial herb forming a cushiony basal clump of leaves. Each leaf is 1–3 cm (0.39–1.18 in) long and gray-green in a coat of coarse hairs.

The erect inflorescence may bear over 100 mustardlike flowers with yellow petals each under .5 cm (0.20 in) in length. The fruit is an oval-shaped, twisted silique containing many seeds.

== Taxonomy ==
There are two varieties of this species:

1. Draba corrugata var. corrugata is the more common variety, found in Southern and Baja California.
2. Draba corrugata var. saxosa, the rarer variety, is known only from the San Bernardino Mountains in San Bernardino County, and the San Gabriel Mountains in San Bernardino and Los Angeles Counties, Southern California.
