= Draba incrassata =

Scientific classification
- Kingdom: Plantae
- Clade: Tracheophytes
- Clade: Angiosperms
- Clade: Eudicots
- Clade: Rosids
- Order: Brassicales
- Family: Brassicaceae
- Genus: Draba
- Species: D. incrassata

Binomial name
- Draba incrassata (Rollins) Rollins & R.A. Price

Species of flowering plant

Draba incrassata is an uncommon species of flowering plant in the family Brassicaceae known by the common name Sweetwater Mountains draba.

It is endemic to California, where it is known mainly from the Sweetwater Mountains of Mono County. It grows in alpine rock fields on the barren high mountain peaks.

Draba incrassata is a small perennial herb forming mats of thick, oval-shaped leaves. Each leaf is under 1.5 centimeters long and mostly hairless except for a prominent fringe of long hairs along the edges. The erect inflorescence bears several flowers with yellow petals just a few millimeters long. The fruit is an oval silique up to about a centimeter long and containing several seeds.
