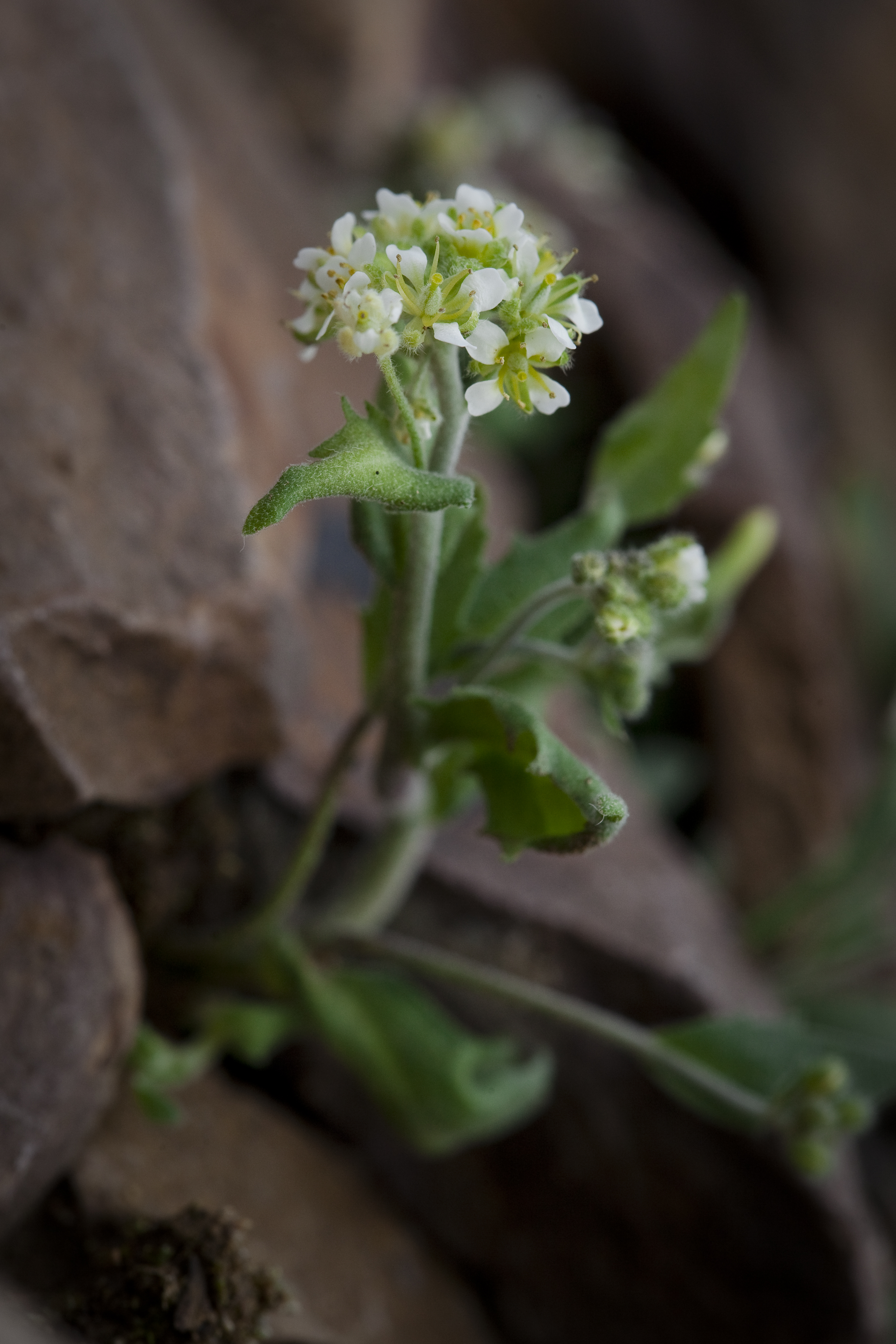

Conservation status
- Vulnerable (NatureServe)

Scientific classification
- Kingdom: Plantae
- Clade: Tracheophytes
- Clade: Angiosperms
- Clade: Eudicots
- Clade: Rosids
- Order: Brassicales
- Family: Brassicaceae
- Genus: Draba
- Species: D. breweri

Binomial name
- Draba breweri S.Wats.

= Draba breweri =

Species of flowering plant

Draba breweri is a species of flowering plant in the family Brassicaceae known by the common names cushion draba, lanceleaf draba, Brewer's draba, and Brewer's whitlow grass. With Draba cana now considered a variety of this species, it is distributed throughout parts of northern and western North America, including much of Canada and the western United States. The less widespread var. breweri is limited to mountainous California and western Nevada.

This is a perennial herb forming small clumps in rocky high mountain areas. Most of the leaves are located in a patch at the base of the stems, with a few higher up on the stems. They are oval in shape and hairy, with each white hair branching into a star shape. The erect inflorescence bears several white mustardlike flowers. The fruit is a twisted, hairy, lance-shaped silique no longer than about a centimeter.
