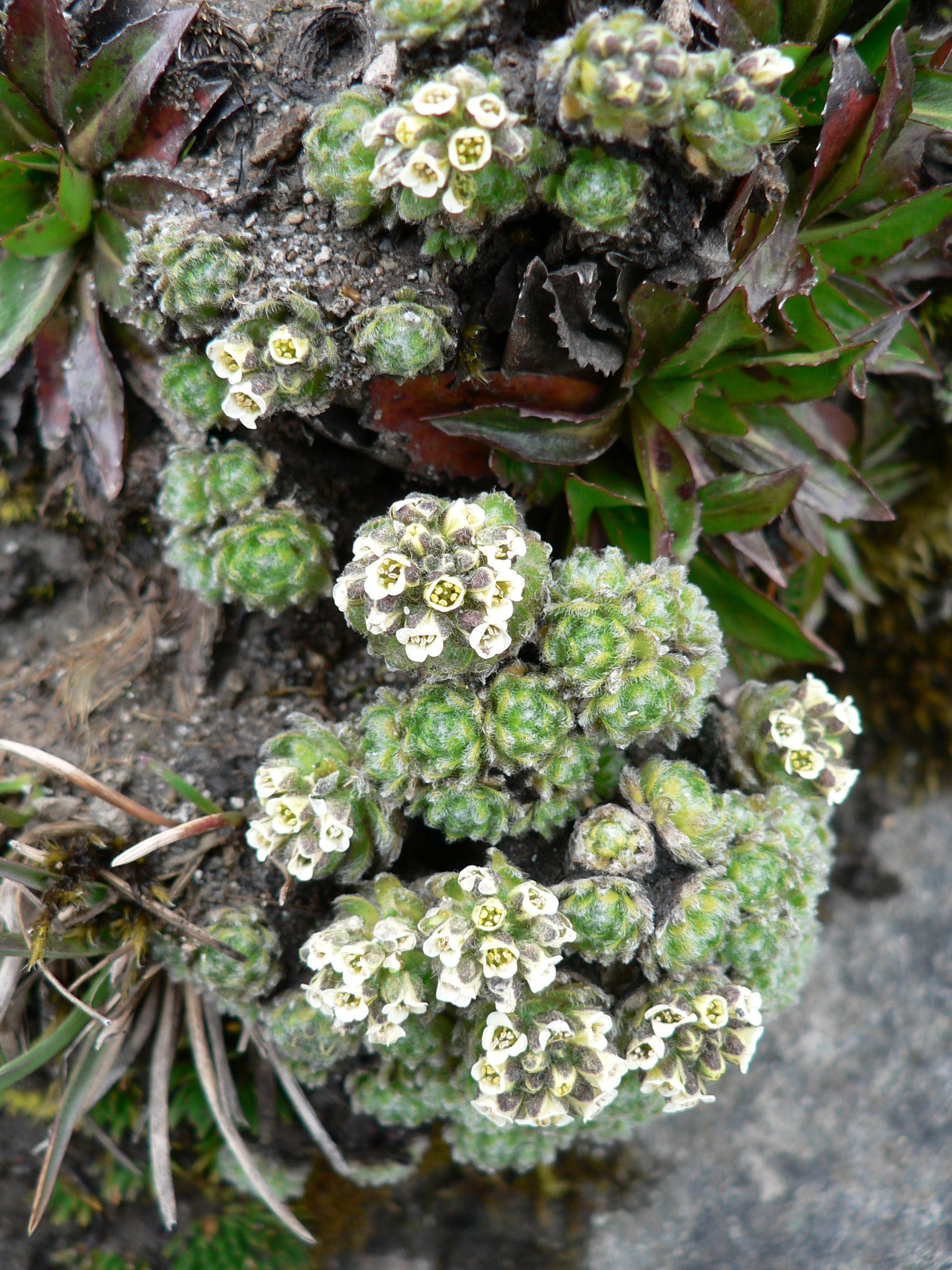

Conservation status
- Endangered (IUCN 3.1)

Scientific classification
- Kingdom: Plantae
- Clade: Tracheophytes
- Clade: Angiosperms
- Clade: Eudicots
- Clade: Rosids
- Order: Brassicales
- Family: Brassicaceae
- Genus: Draba
- Species: D. aretioides

Binomial name
- Draba aretioides Kunth

= Draba aretioides =

Species of flowering plant

Draba aretioides is a species of flowering plant in the family Brassicaceae. It is found only in Ecuador. Its natural habitat is rocky areas. Cushion forming herb, on soil formed from calcareous rock. Foliage grayish-green. Flowers white to yellowish.
