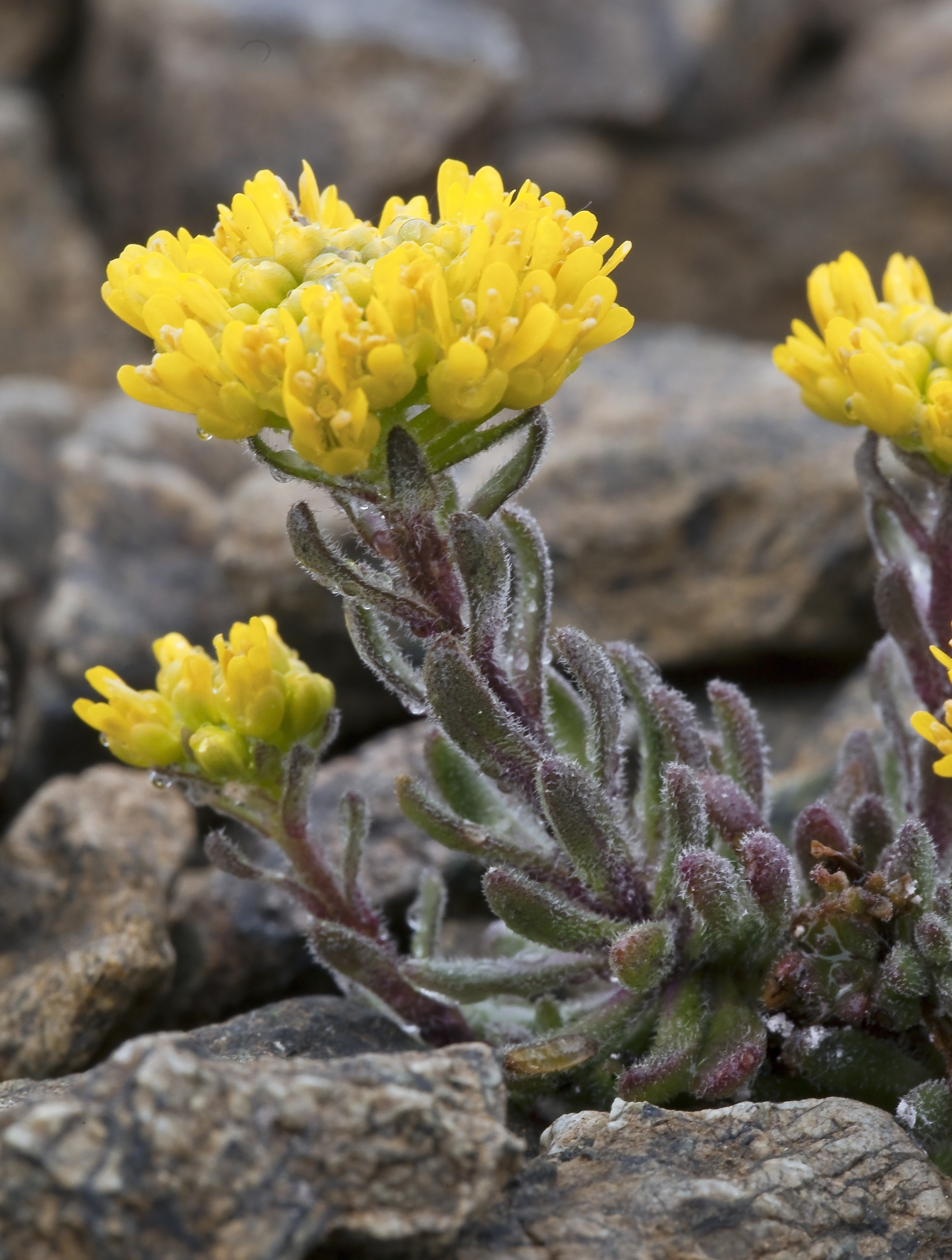

Scientific classification
- Kingdom: Plantae
- Clade: Tracheophytes
- Clade: Angiosperms
- Clade: Eudicots
- Clade: Rosids
- Order: Brassicales
- Family: Brassicaceae
- Genus: Draba
- Species: D. aureola

Binomial name
- Draba aureola S.Wats.

= Draba aureola =

Species of flowering plant

Draba aureola is a species of flowering plant in the family Brassicaceae known as the Mt. Lassen draba or Mt. Lassen whitlow-grass. This plant is native to the Cascade Range of western North America, where it grows at elevations above 2000 meters. This is usually a perennial plant found growing in rocky areas such as volcanic cliffs and scree. It has one or more short, stout stems which are covered in stiff hairs. The leaves grow in a dense basal clump at the ground. They are fat and fleshy and covered in a carpetlike coat of stiff, light-colored, branching hairs. The stem may be erect above the clump of leaves or its inflorescence may rest directly upon them. The spherical or club-shaped inflorescence may have up to 80 small, yellow flowers packed densely in it, each petal about 5 millimeters wide. The fruit is a wavy-edged, hairy silique about a centimeter long and half a centimeter wide.
