= Draba hookeri =

Conservation status
- Near Threatened (IUCN 3.1)

Scientific classification
- Kingdom: Plantae
- Clade: Tracheophytes
- Clade: Angiosperms
- Clade: Eudicots
- Clade: Rosids
- Order: Brassicales
- Family: Brassicaceae
- Genus: Draba
- Species: D. hookeri

Binomial name
- Draba hookeri Walp.

Species of flowering plant

Draba hookeri is a species of flowering plant in the family Brassicaceae. It is found only in Ecuador. Its natural habitats are subtropical or tropical high-altitude grassland and rocky areas. It is threatened by habitat loss.
