= Draba kluanei =

Scientific classification
- Kingdom: Plantae
- Clade: Tracheophytes
- Clade: Angiosperms
- Clade: Eudicots
- Clade: Rosids
- Order: Brassicales
- Family: Brassicaceae
- Genus: Draba
- Species: D. kluanei

Binomial name
- Draba kluanei G.A.Mulligan

Species of flowering plant

Draba kluanei, also known as Kluane draba, is a species of plant in the Draba genus. It is endemic to the Kluane National Park in the Yukon, Canada. It is listed as possibly extinct by NatureServe.
