= Draba spruceana =

Conservation status
- Vulnerable (IUCN 3.1)

Scientific classification
- Kingdom: Plantae
- Clade: Tracheophytes
- Clade: Angiosperms
- Clade: Eudicots
- Clade: Rosids
- Order: Brassicales
- Family: Brassicaceae
- Genus: Draba
- Species: D. spruceana

Binomial name
- Draba spruceana Wedd.

Species of flowering plant

Draba spruceana is a species of flowering plant in the family Brassicaceae. It is found only in Ecuador. Its natural habitats are subtropical or tropical high-altitude grassland and rocky areas. It is threatened by habitat loss.
