= Draba malpighiacea =

Conservation status
- Critically Imperiled (NatureServe)

Scientific classification
- Kingdom: Plantae
- Clade: Tracheophytes
- Clade: Angiosperms
- Clade: Eudicots
- Clade: Rosids
- Order: Brassicales
- Family: Brassicaceae
- Genus: Draba
- Species: D. malpighiacea

Binomial name
- Draba malpighiacea Windham & Al-Shehbaz

Species of flowering plant

Draba malpighiacea is a plant species endemic to southwestern Colorado. It is known from only 3 counties: Montezuma, La Plata, and Hinsdale. It grows on rocky slopes in subalpine conifer forests at elevations of 3000–3500 m.

Draba malpighiacea is distinguished from all other United States members of the genus by the predominance of malpighiaceous trichomes (hairs straight but attached to the leaf at the middle of the hair). The plant is a perennial with an unbranched stem up to 15 cm high. It has basal leaves up to 2 cm long, and smaller leaves on the stems. Flowers are yellow, up to 12 cm in diameter.
