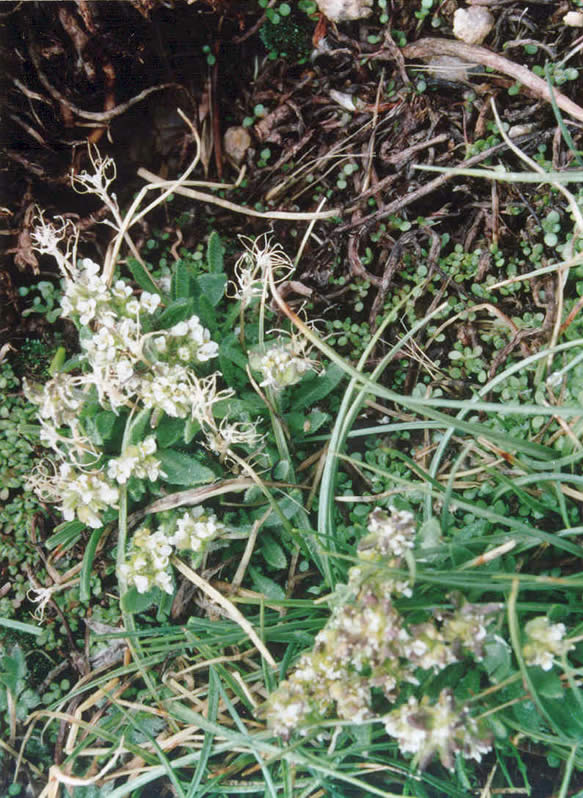

Conservation status
- Critically Imperiled (NatureServe)

Scientific classification
- Kingdom: Plantae
- Clade: Tracheophytes
- Clade: Angiosperms
- Clade: Eudicots
- Clade: Rosids
- Order: Brassicales
- Family: Brassicaceae
- Genus: Draba
- Species: D. monoensis

Binomial name
- Draba monoensis Rollins & R.A. Price

= Draba monoensis =

Species of flowering plant

Draba monoensis is an uncommon species of flowering plant in the mustard family known by the common names White Mountains draba and Mono draba.

It is endemic to Mono County, California, where it grows in moist, rocky habitat in the alpine climate of the White Mountains.

== Description ==
Draba monoensis is a small perennial herb forming clusters of hairy, oblong leaves up to 2 centimetres (0.79 in) long. Each leaf is under 1.5 centimetres (0.59 in) long and mostly hairless except for a prominent fringe of long hairs along the edges.

The erect inflorescence bears 10 to 20 white flowers with petals only a 1–2 centimetres (0.39–0.79 in) long. The fruit is an oval-shaped silique up to 0.5 centimetres (0.20 in) long which contains several tiny seeds.
