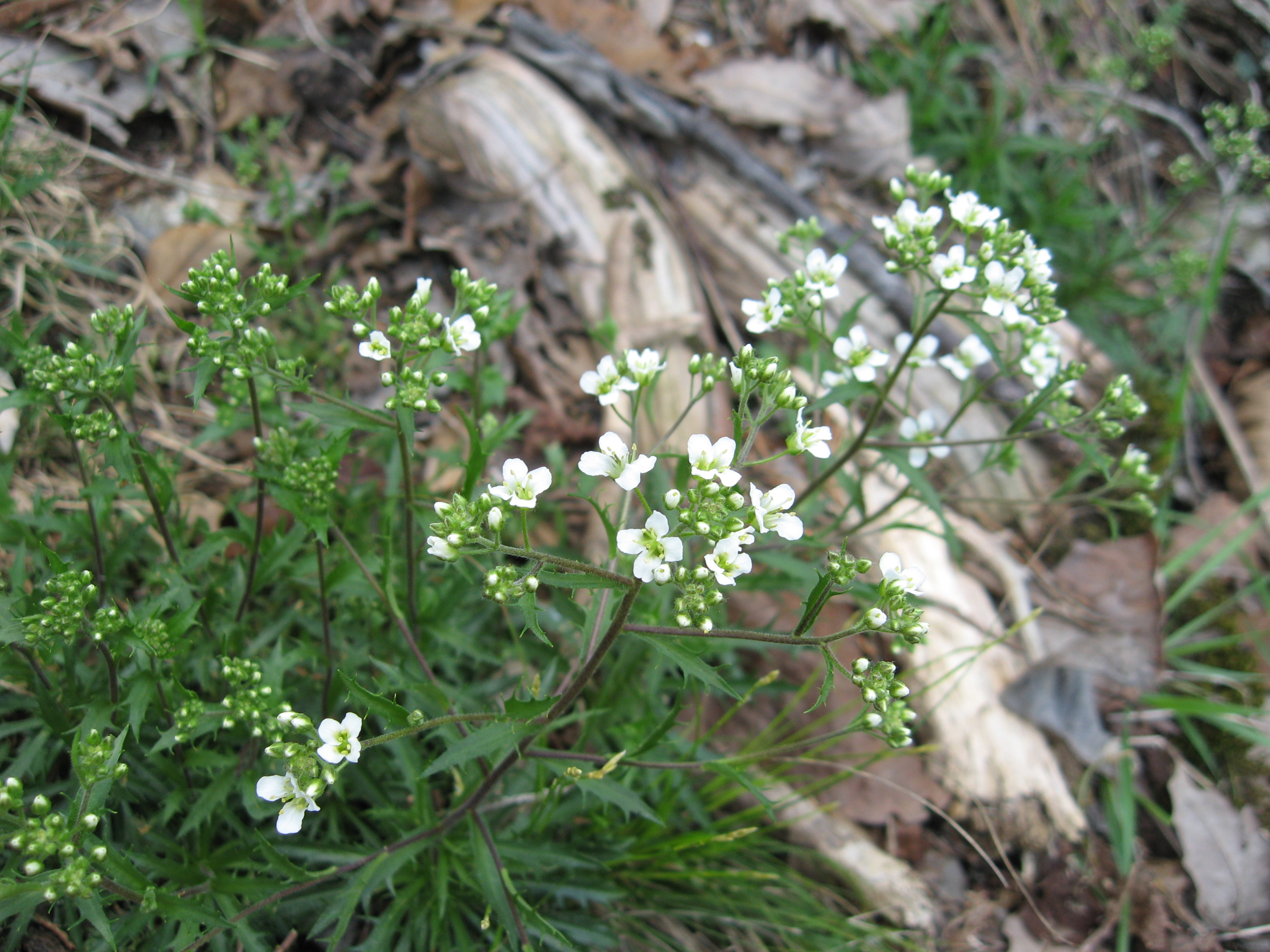

Scientific classification
- Kingdom: Plantae
- Clade: Tracheophytes
- Clade: Angiosperms
- Clade: Eudicots
- Clade: Rosids
- Order: Brassicales
- Family: Brassicaceae
- Genus: Draba
- Species: D. ramosissima

Binomial name
- Draba ramosissima Desv.

= Draba ramosissima =

Species of flowering plant

Draba ramosissima, the branched draba, is a species of flowering plant in the family Brassicaceae. It has a restricted range, being found only on calcareous cliffs of the Appalachian Mountains, the Kentucky River Palisades, and Middle Tennessee. It is a small perennial herb with racemes of white flowers in the spring.
