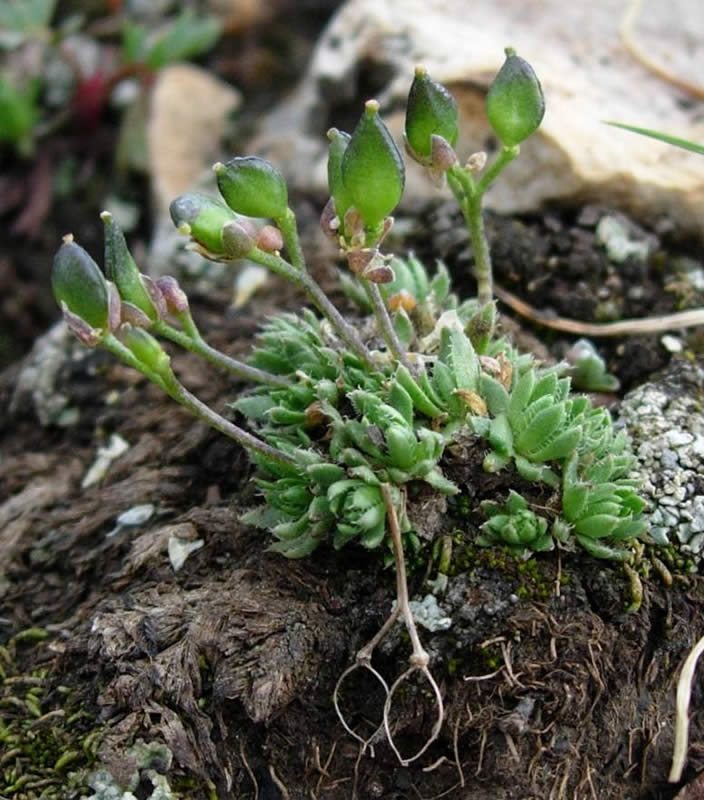

Conservation status
- Vulnerable (NatureServe)

Scientific classification
- Kingdom: Plantae
- Clade: Tracheophytes
- Clade: Angiosperms
- Clade: Eudicots
- Clade: Rosids
- Order: Brassicales
- Family: Brassicaceae
- Genus: Draba
- Species: D. globosa

Binomial name
- Draba globosa Payson

= Draba globosa =

Species of flowering plant

Draba globosa is a species of flowering plant in the family Brassicaceae known by the common names beavertip draba, round-fruited draba, and rockcress draba. It is native to the western United States, where it occurs in Idaho, Montana, Utah, Wyoming, and possibly Colorado.

This species is a small, clumpy perennial herb with stems just a few centimeters long. The leaf blades are under a centimeter long. The inflorescence is a raceme of up to 7 flowers with white or light-yellow petals. This species is similar to many other Draba and a hand lens or microscope is necessary to tell them apart.

This species grows in mountain habitat such as talus and mountain meadows. It is largely an alpine climate species, growing at elevations above 9,000 feet. It can also be found in subalpine areas. The soils are limestone and granite and the terrain is rocky. It may be associated with a plant community dominated by Carex elynoides and Festuca brachyphylla.
