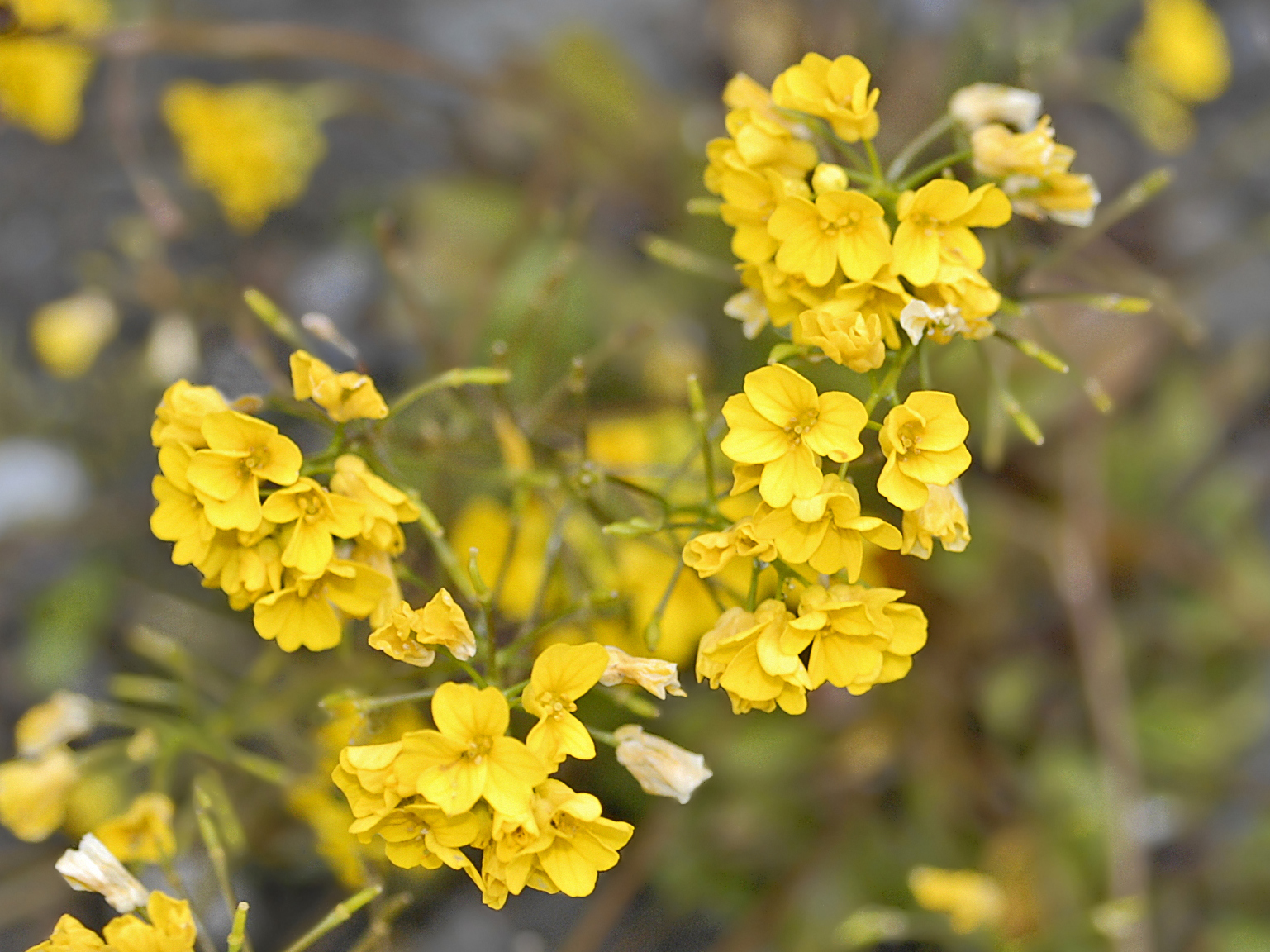
- Flowers of Draba hispida at the Giardino Botanico Alpino Chanousia

Scientific classification
- Kingdom: Plantae
- Clade: Tracheophytes
- Clade: Angiosperms
- Clade: Eudicots
- Clade: Rosids
- Order: Brassicales
- Family: Brassicaceae
- Genus: Draba
- Species: D. hispida

Binomial name
- Draba hispida Willd.

Synonyms
- Draba hispida var. tridentata (DC.) Kuntze; Draba pallidiflora Rupr. ex Tolm.; Draba rupestris Willd. ex DC.; Draba tridentata DC.

= Draba hispida =

Species of flowering plant

Draba hispida, the three-toothed whitlow grass, is a species of plant in the family Brassicaceae.

== Description ==
Draba hispida is a perennial plant, with a basal rosette of obovate hairy leaves. The erect stems carry a small number of yellow flowers

== Distribution and habitat ==
This species is native to Asia Minor (north-eastern Turkey, Central Anatolia Region and Caucasus Mountains). It grows in a subalpine habitat at an elevation up to 3,200 metres (10,500 ft) above sea level.
