= Pseudodraba =

Scientific classification
- Kingdom: Plantae
- Clade: Tracheophytes
- Clade: Angiosperms
- Clade: Eudicots
- Clade: Rosids
- Order: Brassicales
- Family: Brassicaceae
- Tribe: Arabideae
- Genus: Pseudodraba; Al-Shehbaz, D.A.German & M.Koch
- Species: P. hystrix

Binomial name
- Pseudodraba hystrix (Hook.f. & Thomson) Al-Shehbaz, D.A.German & M.Koch

Synonyms
- Draba hystrix Hook.f. & Thomson (1861) (basionym); Draba rhodantha Rech.f. & Edelb.

Genus of flowering plants

Pseudodraba is a genus of flowering plants in the family Brassicaceae. It includes a single species, Pseudodraba hystrix, a subshrub native to Afghanistan and western Pakistan.

The species was first described as Draba hystrix by Joseph Dalton Hooker and Thomas Thomson in 1861. In 2011 Ihsan Ali Al-Shehbaz, Dmitry A. German, and Marcus A. Koch placed the species in the new monotypic genus Pseudodraba as Pseudodraba hystrix.
