= List of Canadian plants by family B =

Main page: List of Canadian plants by family

The following families of vascular plants are listed as occurring in Canada:

For mosses of Canada, see:

== Balsaminaceae ==
- Impatiens aurella — pale-yellow jewelweed
- Impatiens capensis — spotted jewelweed
- Impatiens ecalcarata — spurless touch-me-not
- Impatiens noli-tangere — western jewelweed
- Impatiens pallida — pale jewelweed

== Bartramiaceae ==
- Anacolia menziesii
- Bartramia halleriana
- Bartramia ithyphylla
- Bartramia pomiformis
- Bartramia stricta
- Conostomum tetragonum
- Philonotis capillaris
- Philonotis fontana — philonotis moss
- Philonotis marchica
- Philonotis yezoana
- Plagiopus oederiana

== Berberidaceae ==
- Achlys californica — California deer's-foot
- Achlys triphylla — three-leaf deer's-foot
- Caulophyllum giganteum — giant blue cohosh
- Caulophyllum thalictroides — blue cohosh
- Jeffersonia diphylla — twinleaf
- Mahonia aquifolium — Piper's Oregon-grape
- Mahonia nervosa — longleaf Oregon-grape
- Mahonia repens — creeping Oregon-grape
- Podophyllum peltatum — mayapple

== Betulaceae ==
- Alnus incana — speckled alder
- Alnus rubra — red alder
- Alnus serrulata — brookside alder
- Alnus viridis — green alder
- Betula alleghaniensis — yellow birch
- Betula borealis — northern birch
- Betula lenta — sweet birch
- Betula minor — dwarf white birch
- Betula nana — dwarf swamp birch
- Betula neoalaskana — Alaska paper birch
- Betula occidentalis — spring birch
- Betula papyrifera — paper birch
- Betula populifolia — grey birch
- Betula pumila — swamp birch
- Betula x caerulea
- Betula x dutillyi
- Betula x eastwoodiae
- Betula x hornei
- Betula x neoborealis
- Betula x purpusii
- Betula x raymundii
- Betula x sandbergii — Sandberg's birch
- Betula x sargentii
- Betula x uliginosa
- Betula x utahensis
- Betula x winteri
- Carpinus caroliniana — American hornbeam
- Corylus americana — American hazelnut
- Corylus cornuta — beaked hazelnut
- Ostrya virginiana — eastern hop-hornbeam

== Bignoniaceae ==
- Campsis radicans — trumpet-creeper

== Blasiaceae ==
- Blasia pusilla

== Blechnaceae ==
- Blechnum spicant — deer fern
- Lorinseria areolata — netted chainfern
- Woodwardia fimbriata — giant chainfern
- Woodwardia virginica — Virginia chainfern

== Boraginaceae ==
- Amsinckia intermedia — Rancher's fiddleneck
- Amsinckia lycopsoides — bugloss fiddleneck
- Amsinckia menziesii — smallflower fiddleneck
- Amsinckia retrorsa — rough fiddleneck
- Amsinckia spectabilis — seaside fiddleneck
- Amsinckia tessellata — tessellate fiddleneck
- Cryptantha affinis — slender cat's-eye
- Cryptantha ambigua — obscure cat's-eye
- Cryptantha celosioides — cockscomb cat's-eye
- Cryptantha fendleri — Fendler's cat's-eye
- Cryptantha flaccida — weakstem cat's-eye
- Cryptantha kelseyana — Kelsey's cat's-eye
- Cryptantha minima — little cat's-eye
- Cryptantha torreyana — Torrey's cat's-eye
- Cryptantha watsonii — Watson's cat's-eye
- Cynoglossum virginianum — northern wild comfrey
- Eritrichium nanum — arctic forget-me-not
- Eritrichium splendens — showy forget-me-not
- Hackelia ciliata — Okanogan stickseed
- Hackelia deflexa — northern stickseed
- Hackelia diffusa — spreading stickseed
- Hackelia floribunda — Davis Mountain stickseed
- Hackelia micrantha — blue stickseed
- Hackelia virginiana — Virginia stickseed
- Heliotropium curassavicum — seaside heliotrope
- Lappula occidentalis — flatspine sheepburr
- Lithospermum canescens — hoary puccoon
- Lithospermum caroliniense — golden puccoon
- Lithospermum incisum — narrow-leaved puccoon
- Lithospermum latifolium — American gromwell
- Lithospermum ruderale — western gromwell
- Mertensia drummondii — Drummond's bluebells
- Mertensia lanceolata — prairie bluebells
- Mertensia longiflora — longflower bluebells
- Mertensia maritima — sea bluebells
- Mertensia paniculata — tall bluebells
- Mertensia virginica — Virginia bluebells
- Myosotis asiatica — Asian forget-me-not
- Myosotis laxa — small forget-me-not
- Myosotis macrosperma — largeseed forget-me-not
- Myosotis verna — spring forget-me-not
- Onosmodium molle — soft-hairy false gromwell
- Pectocarya penicillata — shortleaf combseed
- Plagiobothrys figuratus — rough popcorn-flower
- Plagiobothrys scouleri — meadow popcorn-flower
- Plagiobothrys tenellus — Pacific popcorn-flower

== Brachytheciaceae ==
- Brachythecium acuminatum
- Brachythecium acutum
- Brachythecium albicans
- Brachythecium biventrosum
- Brachythecium calcareum
- Brachythecium campestre
- Brachythecium collinum
- Brachythecium digastrum
- Brachythecium erythrorrhizon
- Brachythecium frigidum
- Brachythecium glaciale
- Brachythecium groenlandicum
- Brachythecium holzingeri
- Brachythecium hylotapetum
- Brachythecium leibergii
- Brachythecium mildeanum
- Brachythecium nelsonii
- Brachythecium oedipodium
- Brachythecium oxycladon
- Brachythecium plumosum
- Brachythecium populeum — matted feather moss
- Brachythecium reflexum — cedar moss
- Brachythecium rivulare — waterside feather moss
- Brachythecium rotaeanum — Rota's feather moss
- Brachythecium rutabulum
- Brachythecium salebrosum
- Brachythecium starkei
- Brachythecium trachypodium
- Brachythecium turgidum
- Brachythecium velutinum
- Bryhnia graminicolor
- Bryhnia hultenii
- Bryhnia novae-angliae — New England bryhnia moss
- Bryoandersonia illecebra
- Cirriphyllum cirrosum
- Cirriphyllum piliferum
- Eurhynchium hians
- Eurhynchium oreganum — Oregon beaked moss
- Eurhynchium praelongum
- Eurhynchium pulchellum
- Homalothecium aeneum
- Homalothecium arenarium
- Homalothecium fulgescens
- Homalothecium nevadense
- Homalothecium nuttallii
- Homalothecium pinnatifidum
- Homalothecium sericeum
- Isothecium alopecuroides
- Isothecium cristatum
- Isothecium myosuroides
- Platyhypnidium riparioides
- Pseudoscleropodium purum
- Scleropodium cespitans
- Scleropodium obtusifolium
- Scleropodium touretii
- Steerecleus serrulatus — steerecleus moss
- Tomentypnum falcifolium
- Tomentypnum nitens
- Trachybryum megaptilum

== Brassicaceae ==
- Alyssum obovatum — American alyssum
- Aphragmus eschscholtzianus — Aleutian-cress
- Arabidopsis salsuginea — saltwater cress
- Arabis alpina — alpine rockcress
- Arabis arenicola — arctic rockcress
- Arabis boivinii — Boivin's rockcress
- Arabis calderi — Calder's rockcress
- Arabis canadensis — sicklepod
- Arabis codyi — Cody's rockcress
- Arabis drummondii — Drummond's rockcress
- Arabis glabra — tower-mustard
- Arabis hirsuta — western hairy rockcress
- Arabis holboellii — Holböll's rockcress
- Arabis laevigata — smooth rockcress
- Arabis lemmonii — Lemmon's rockcress
- Arabis lignifera — Owens Valley rockcress
- Arabis lyallii — Lyall's rockcress
- Arabis lyrata — lyreleaf rockcress
- Arabis microphylla — small-leaf rockcress
- Arabis murrayi — Murray's rockcress
- Arabis nuttallii — Nuttall's rockcress
- Arabis shortii — Short's rockcress
- Arabis sparsiflora — elegant rockcress
- Arabis x divaricarpa — hybrid rockcress
- Armoracia lacustris — lake-cress
- Athysanus pusillus — common sandweed
- Barbarea orthoceras — American wintercress
- Braya fernaldii — Fernald's northern rockcress
- Braya glabella — smooth rockcress
- Braya humilis — low braya
- Braya longii — Long's braya
- Braya pilosa — hairy rockcress
- Braya thorild-wulffii — Greenland rockcress
- Cakile edentula — American sea-rocket
- Cardamine angulata — seaside bittercress
- Cardamine bellidifolia — alpine bittercress
- Cardamine breweri — Brewer's bittercress
- Cardamine bulbosa — bulbous bittercress
- Cardamine concatenata — cutleaf toothwort
- Cardamine digitata — Richardson's bittercress
- Cardamine diphylla — two-leaf toothwort
- Cardamine douglassii — purple cress
- Cardamine lyallii — Lyall's bittercress
- Cardamine maxima — large toothwort
- Cardamine microphylla — littleleaf bittercress
- Cardamine nuttallii — Nuttall's toothwort
- Cardamine occidentalis — western bittercress
- Cardamine oligosperma — few-seed bittercress
- Cardamine parviflora — smallflower bittercress
- Cardamine pensylvanica — Pennsylvania bittercress
- Cardamine pratensis — cuckoo-flower
- Cardamine x anomala
- Cochlearia groenlandica — Greenland cochlearia
- Cochlearia officinalis — scurvy-grass
- Cochlearia tridactylites — limestone scruvy-grass
- Descurainia incana — mountain tansy-mustard
- Descurainia pinnata — pinnate tansy-mustard
- Descurainia sophioides — northern tansy-mustard
- Draba albertina — slender whitlow-grass
- Draba alpina — alpine whitlow-grass
- Draba arabisans — rock whitlow-grass
- Draba arctogena — fell-field whitlow-grass
- Draba aurea — golden draba
- Draba borealis — boreal whitlow-grass
- Draba cana — hoary draba
- Draba cinerea — greyleaf whitlow-grass
- Draba corymbosa — flat-top whitlow-grass
- Draba crassifolia — snowbed whitlow-grass
- Draba densifolia — denseleaf whitlow-grass
- Draba fladnizensis — white arctic whitlow-grass
- Draba glabella — rock whitlow-grass
- Draba hyperborea — North Pacific whitlow-grass
- Draba incana — hoary whitlow-grass
- Draba incerta — Yellowstone whitlow-grass
- Draba juvenilis — longstalk whitlow-grass
- Draba kananaskis — tundra whitlow-grass
- Draba kluanei — Kluane Park whitlow-grass
- Draba lactea — milky whitlow-grass
- Draba laurentiana — St. Lawrence whitlow-grass
- Draba lonchocarpa — lancepod whitlow-grass
- Draba macounii — Macoun's whitlow-grass
- Draba macrocarpa — Chukchi Peninsula whitlow-grass
- Draba murrayi — Murray's whitlow-grass
- Draba nemorosa — wood whitlow-grass
- Draba nivalis — yellow arctic whitlow-grass
- Draba norvegica — Norwegian whitlow-grass
- Draba oblongata — Canadian arctic whitlow-grass
- Draba ogilviensis — Ogilvie Range whitlow-grass
- Draba oligosperma — few-seed whitlow-grass
- Draba palanderiana — Palander's whitlow-grass
- Draba pauciflora — Adam's whitlow-grass
- Draba paysonii — Payson's whitlow-grass
- Draba porsildii — Porsild's whitlow-grass
- Draba praealta — tall whitlow-grass
- Draba pycnosperma — dense whitlow-grass
- Draba reptans — Carolina whitlow-grass
- Draba ruaxes — Rainier's whitlow-grass
- Draba scotteri — Scotter's whitlow-grass
- Draba stenoloba — Alaska whitlow-grass
- Draba stenopetala — Anadyr whitlow-grass
- Draba subcapitata — Ellesmere Island whitlow-grass
- Draba ventosa — Wind River whitlow-grass
- Draba yukonensis — Yukon whitlow-grass
- Erysimum angustatum — Dawson wallflower
- Erysimum arenicola — Cascade wallflower
- Erysimum asperum — prairie-rocket wallflower
- Erysimum capitatum — western wallflower
- Erysimum cheiranthoides — wormseed wallflower
- Erysimum inconspicuum — smallflower prairie wallflower
- Erysimum redowskii (syn. E. pallasii) — Pallas' wallflower
- Eutrema edwardsii — Edwards' eutrema
- Halimolobos mollis — soft rockcress
- Halimolobos virgata — virgate halimolobos
- Halimolobos whitedii — Whited's rockcress
- Hutchinsia procumbens — prostrate hymenolobus
- Idahoa scapigera — scapose scalepod
- Lepidium densiflorum — denseflower pepper-grass
- Lepidium oxycarpum — sharp-pod pepper-grass
- Lepidium ramosissimum — branched pepper-grass
- Lepidium virginicum — poor-man's pepper-grass
- Lesquerella alpina — alpine bladderpod
- Lesquerella arctica — arctic bladderpod
- Lesquerella arenosa — Great Plains bladderpod
- Lesquerella calderi — Calder's bladderpod
- Lesquerella douglasii — Douglas' bladderpod
- Lesquerella ludoviciana — silver bladderpod
- Parrya arctica — arctic false-wallflower
- Parrya nudicaulis — naked-stemmed wallflower
- Physaria didymocarpa — common twinpod
- Rorippa barbareifolia — hoary yellowcress
- Rorippa calycina — persistent-sepal yellowcress
- Rorippa crystallina — Asiatic cress
- Rorippa curvipes — Rocky Mountain yellowcress
- Rorippa curvisiliqua — curvepod yellowcress
- Rorippa palustris — bog yellowcress
- Rorippa sinuata — spreading yellowcress
- Rorippa tenerrima — Modoc County yellowcress
- Rorippa truncata — wild yellowcress
- Sisymbrium linifolium (syn. Schoenocrambe linifolia) — Salmon River plains-mustard
- Smelowskia borealis — northern smelowskia
- Smelowskia calycina — alpine smelowskia
- Smelowskia ovalis — alpine smelowskia
- Subularia aquatica — water awlwort
- Thelypodium laciniatum — cutleaf thelypody
- Thlaspi arcticum — arctic pennycress
- Thysanocarpus curvipes — fringepod

== Bruchiaceae ==
- Bruchia flexuosa
- Trematodon ambiguus
- Trematodon boasii
- Trematodon longicollis
- Trematodon montanus

== Bryaceae ==
- Anomobryum filiforme
- Bryum algovicum
- Bryum alpinum
- Bryum amblyodon
- Bryum archangelicum
- Bryum arcticum
- Bryum argenteum — silvery bryum
- Bryum blindii
- Bryum caespiticium
- Bryum calobryoides
- Bryum calophyllum
- Bryum canariense
- Bryum capillare
- Bryum cyclophyllum
- Bryum dichotomum — bryum moss
- Bryum erythroloma
- Bryum flaccidum
- Bryum gemmascens
- Bryum gemmiparum
- Bryum klinggraeffii
- Bryum knowltonii
- Bryum lisae
- Bryum lonchocaulon
- Bryum longisetum
- Bryum marratii
- Bryum meesioides
- Bryum miniatum
- Bryum muehlenbeckii
- Bryum nitidulum
- Bryum oblongum
- Bryum pallens
- Bryum pallescens
- Bryum pseudotriquetrum
- Bryum purpurascens
- Bryum ruderale
- Bryum salinum
- Bryum schleicheri
- Bryum stirtonii
- Bryum subapiculatum
- Bryum subneodamense
- Bryum tenuisetum
- Bryum teres
- Bryum turbinatum
- Bryum uliginosum
- Bryum violaceum
- Bryum warneum
- Bryum weigelii
- Bryum wrightii
- Epipterygium tozeri
- Leptobryum pyriforme
- Mielichhoferia macrocarpa
- Mielichhoferia mielichhoferiana
- Plagiobryum demissum
- Plagiobryum zieri
- Pohlia andalusica
- Pohlia annotina
- Pohlia atropurpurea
- Pohlia bolanderi
- Pohlia brevinervis
- Pohlia bulbifera
- Pohlia camptotrachela
- Pohlia cardotii
- Pohlia columbica
- Pohlia cruda
- Pohlia crudoides
- Pohlia drummondii
- Pohlia elongata
- Pohlia erecta
- Pohlia filum
- Pohlia lescuriana
- Pohlia longibracteata
- Pohlia longicolla
- Pohlia ludwigii
- Pohlia melanodon
- Pohlia nutans
- Pohlia obtusifolia
- Pohlia pacifica
- Pohlia proligera
- Pohlia sphagnicola
- Pohlia tundrae
- Pohlia vexans
- Pohlia wahlenbergii
- Rhodobryum ontariense
- Rhodobryum roseum — rose moss
- Roellia roellii

== Buxbaumiaceae ==
- Buxbaumia aphylla — bug-on-a-stick
- Buxbaumia minakatae — hump-backed elves
- Buxbaumia piperi
- Buxbaumia viridis
- Diphyscium foliosum — powder gun moss
