= List of Capparales of Montana =

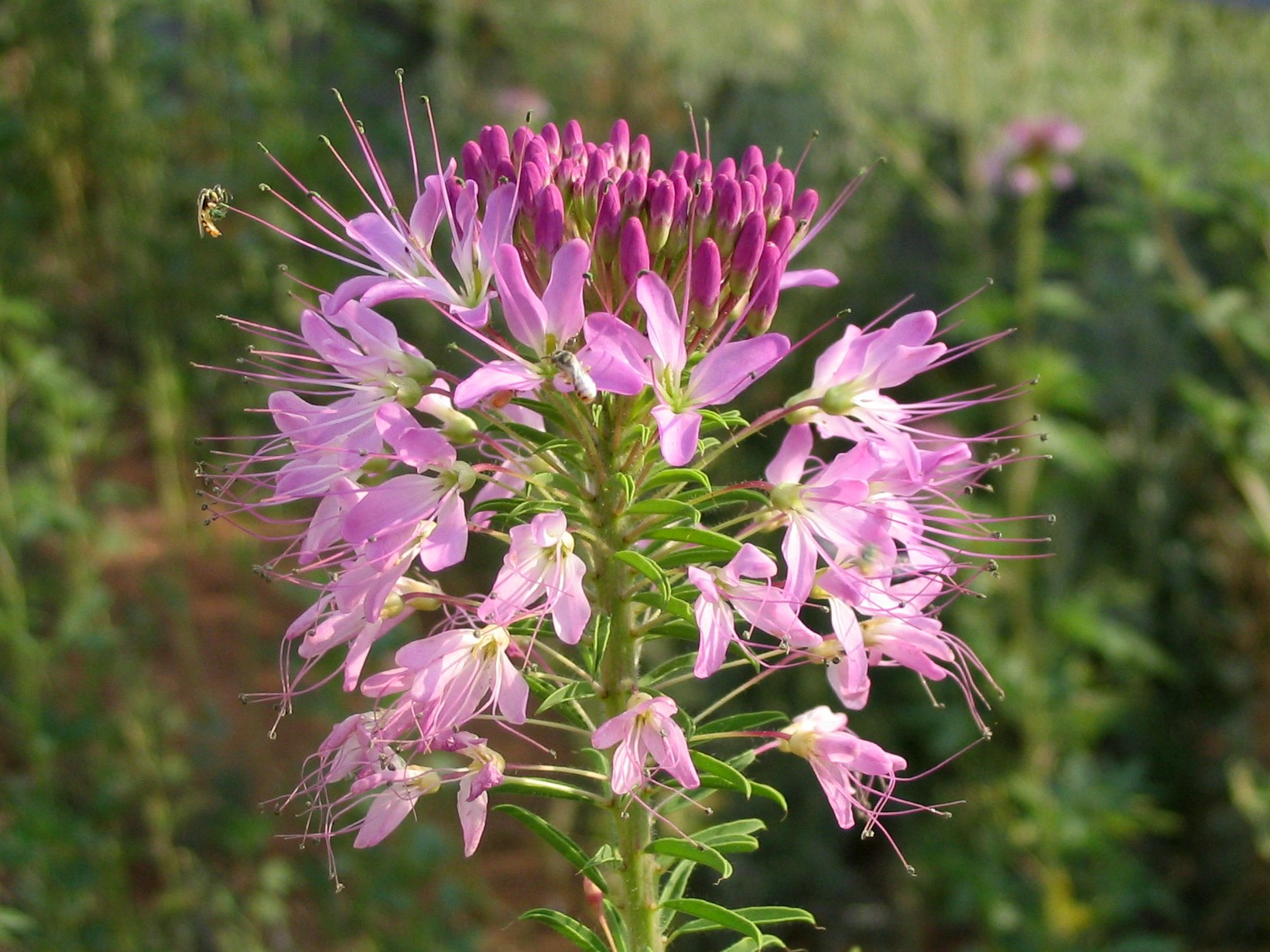
Rocky Mountain beeplant, Cleome serrulata

There are at least 171 members of the caper, mignonette and mustard order, Capparales, found in Montana. Some of these species are exotics (not native to Montana) and some species have been designated as Species of Concern.

== Capers ==
Family: Capparaceae

- Cleome lutea, yellow beeplant
- Cleome serrulata, Rocky Mountain beeplant
- Polanisia dodecandra, common clammyweed

== Mignonette ==
Family: Resedaceae

- Reseda lutea, yellow mignonette

== Mustards ==
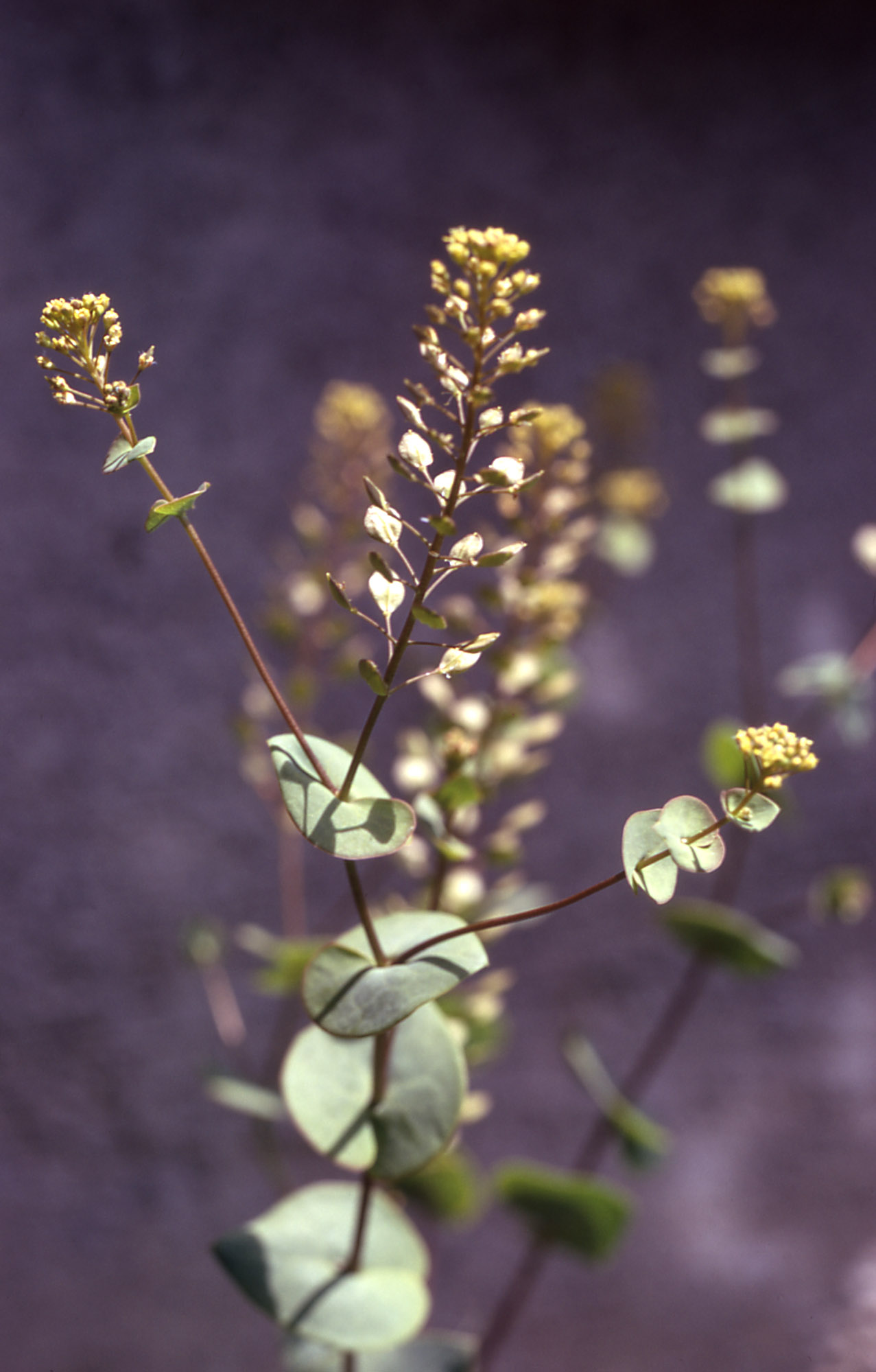
Clasping pepper-grass, Lepidium perfoliatum

Family: Brassicaceae

- Alyssum desertorum, desert alyssum
- Alyssum parviflorum, alyssum
- Barbarea orthoceras, American winter-cress
- Berteroa incana, hoary false-alyssum
- Boechera calderi, Calder's rockcress
- Boechera collinsii, Collins' rockcress
- Boechera demissa, daggett rockcress
- Boechera divaricarpa, hybrid rockcress
- Boechera pauciflora, elegant rockcress
- Boechera pendulocarpa, dropseed rockcress
- Boechera sparsiflora, elegant rockcress
- Boechera stricta, Drummond's rockcress
- Brassica juncea, Chinese mustard
- Brassica nigra, black mustard
- Brassica rapa, field mustard
- Capsella bursa-pastoris, common shepherd's purse
- Cardamine breweri, Brewer's bittercress
- Cardamine oligosperma, few-seed bittercress
- Cardamine oligosperma var. kamtschatica
- Cardamine rupicola, cliff toothwort
- Chorispora tenella, common blue-mustard
- Conringia orientalis, hare's-ear mustard
- Descurainia sophia, herb sophia
- Draba aurea, golden draba
- Draba cana, hoary draba
- Draba daviesiae, bitterroot draba
- Draba densifolia, dense-leaf draba
- Draba oligosperma, few-seed whitlow-grass
- Draba reptans, Carolina whitlow-grass
- Draba stenoloba, Alaska whitlow-grass
- Erucastrum gallicum, common dogmustard
- Hesperis matronalis, dame's rocket
- Hornungia procumbens, hutchinsia
- Isatis tinctoria, dyer's woad
- Lepidium campestre, field pepper-grass
- Lepidium densiflorum, dense-flower pepper-grass
- Lepidium densiflorum var. densiflorum, common pepperweed
- Lepidium densiflorum var. pubecarpum, babyseed pepperweed
- Lepidium latifolium, broad-leaf pepper-grass
- Lepidium perfoliatum, clasping pepper-grass
- Lepidium ramosissimum, branched pepper-grass
- Lepidium ramosissimum var. bourgeauanum, Bourgeau's pepper-grass
- Lepidium sativum, garden pepper-grass
- Lepidium virginicum var. medium, intermediate pepperweed
- Lepidium virginicum var. pubescens, hairy pepperweed
- Malcolmia africana, African adder's-mouth
- Physaria arenosa, Great Plains bladderpod
- Physaria brassicoides, double bladderpod
- Physaria curvipes, curved bladderpod
- Physaria didymocarpa, common twinpod
- Physaria douglasii, Douglas bladderpod
- Physaria geyeri, Geyer's twinpod
- Physaria humilis, bitterroot bladderpod
- Physaria klausii, divide bladderpod
- Physaria pulchella, beautiful bladderpod
- Physaria saximontana, Fremont County twinpod
- Raphanus sativus, garden radish
- Rorippa austriaca, Austrian yellowcress
- Rorippa curvisiliqua, curve-pod yellowcress
- Rorippa palustris, bog yellowcress
- Rorippa palustris subsp. hispida, hispid yellowcress
- Rorippa palustris var. fernaldiana, Fernald's yellowcress
- Rorippa sylvestris, creeping yellowcress
- Sinapis arvensis, corn mustard
- Sisymbrium officinale, hairy-pod hedge-mustard
- Smelowskia calycina, alpine smelowskia
- Stanleya pinnata, desert prince's-plume
- Stanleya pinnata var. integrifolia, golden prince's-plume
- Stanleya pinnata var. pinnata, desert prince's-plume
- Stanleya viridiflora, green prince's-plume
- Thelypodium integrifolium, entireleaf thelypody
- Thlaspi arvense, field pennycress

== See also ==
- List of dicotyledons of Montana
