= Sisymbrium sylvestre =

Sisymbrium sylvestre may be:

- S. sylvestre L., a synonym of Rorippa sylvestris (L.) Besser
- S. sylvestre C.Mohr ex Bab., a synonym of Rorippa palustris (L.) Besser
- S. sylvestre Burm. ex DC., a synonym of Sisymbrium lyratum Burm.f.
- S. sylvestre Burm.f., a synonym of Diplotaxis tenuifolia (L.) DC.
