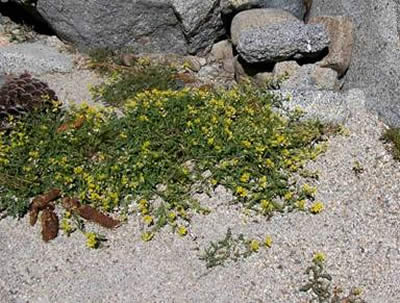

Conservation status
- Critically Imperiled (NatureServe)

Scientific classification
- Kingdom: Plantae
- Clade: Tracheophytes
- Clade: Angiosperms
- Clade: Eudicots
- Clade: Rosids
- Order: Brassicales
- Family: Brassicaceae
- Genus: Rorippa
- Species: R. subumbellata

Binomial name
- Rorippa subumbellata Rollins

= Rorippa subumbellata =

Species of flowering plant

Rorippa subumbellata is a rare species of flowering plant in the family Brassicaceae known by the common names Lake Tahoe yellowcress and Tahoe yellow cress. It is known only from the shores of Lake Tahoe, straddling the border between California and Nevada. There are an estimated fourteen populations of the plant still in existence. It grows only on the direct shoreline of the lake, occupying a seven-foot semi-aquatic zone between the high- and low-tide marks. It is directly impacted by recreational activities on the lake, enduring bombardment by boat wakes, trampling, and construction of docks and other structures.

The population sizes change with the lake's water level, with populations growing largest as water levels drop, exposing more sand habitat. High water levels may be beneficial at times, however, since they kill off competing plant species growing on the beaches. Restoration of this species has been hampered by low seed germination, but recent research has reduced this problem.

== Description ==
This perennial herb produces spreading, branching, hairy stems up to 20 centimeters long. The leaves are 1 to 3 centimeters long, oblong or lance-shaped, and wavy along the edges or divided into lobes. The inflorescence is a compact raceme of mustardlike flowers with yellow petals each about 3 millimeters long. The fruit is a hairless silique a few millimeters wide containing tiny seeds.

== Conservation ==
Rorippa subumbellata is listed as a critically endangered and fully protected species by the State of Nevada and is a California endangered plant species. It was removed as a Candidate species for federal listing in 2015 following successful conservation efforts guided by regional adoption of the Tahoe Yellow Cress Conservation Strategy.
