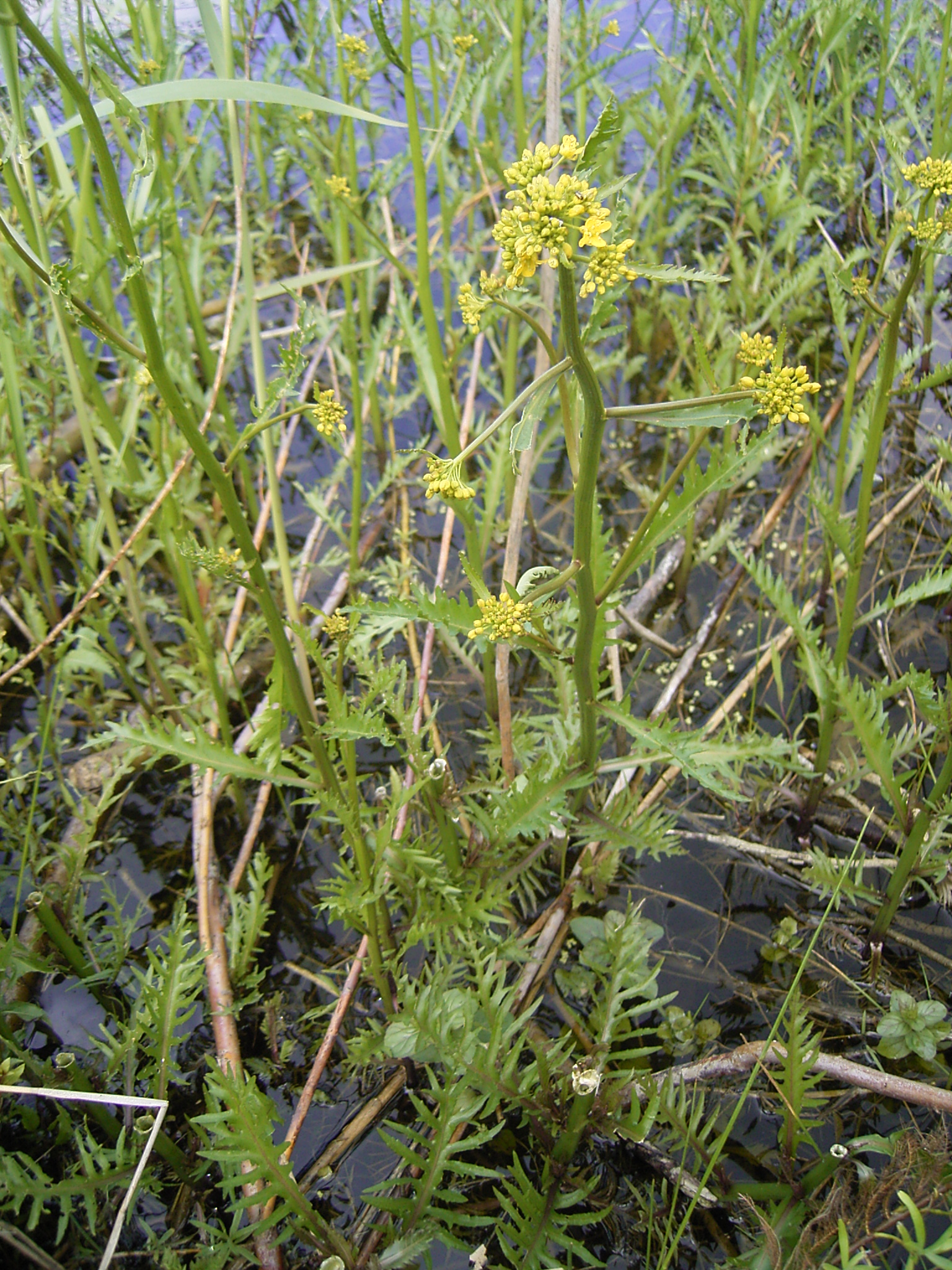

Scientific classification
- Kingdom: Plantae
- Clade: Tracheophytes
- Clade: Angiosperms
- Clade: Eudicots
- Clade: Rosids
- Order: Brassicales
- Family: Brassicaceae
- Genus: Rorippa
- Species: R. amphibia

Binomial name
- Rorippa amphibia (L.) Besser

= Rorippa amphibia =

Species of flowering plant

Rorippa amphibia, also known as great yellow-cress, is a plant species in the family Brassicaceae. The flowers are visited by many types of insects, and can be characterized by a generalized pollination syndrome.
