= Rorippa sphaerocarpa =

Conservation status
- Secure (NatureServe)

Scientific classification
- Kingdom: Plantae
- Clade: Tracheophytes
- Clade: Angiosperms
- Clade: Eudicots
- Clade: Rosids
- Order: Brassicales
- Family: Brassicaceae
- Genus: Rorippa
- Species: R. sphaerocarpa

Binomial name
- Rorippa sphaerocarpa (A.Gray) Britton

Species of flowering plant

Rorippa sphaerocarpa is a species of flowering plant in the family Brassicaceae known by the common name roundfruit yellowcress. It is native to North America, including the western United States and northern Mexico, where it grows in moist habitat, such as riverbanks and mudflats. It is an annual herb producing decumbent or erect stems up to 40 centimeters long. The leaves are up to 10 centimeters long and have blades are deeply divided into toothed lobes. The inflorescence is a raceme of mustardlike flowers with yellow petals each no more than a millimeter long. The fruit is a round silique 1 or 2 millimeters wide.
