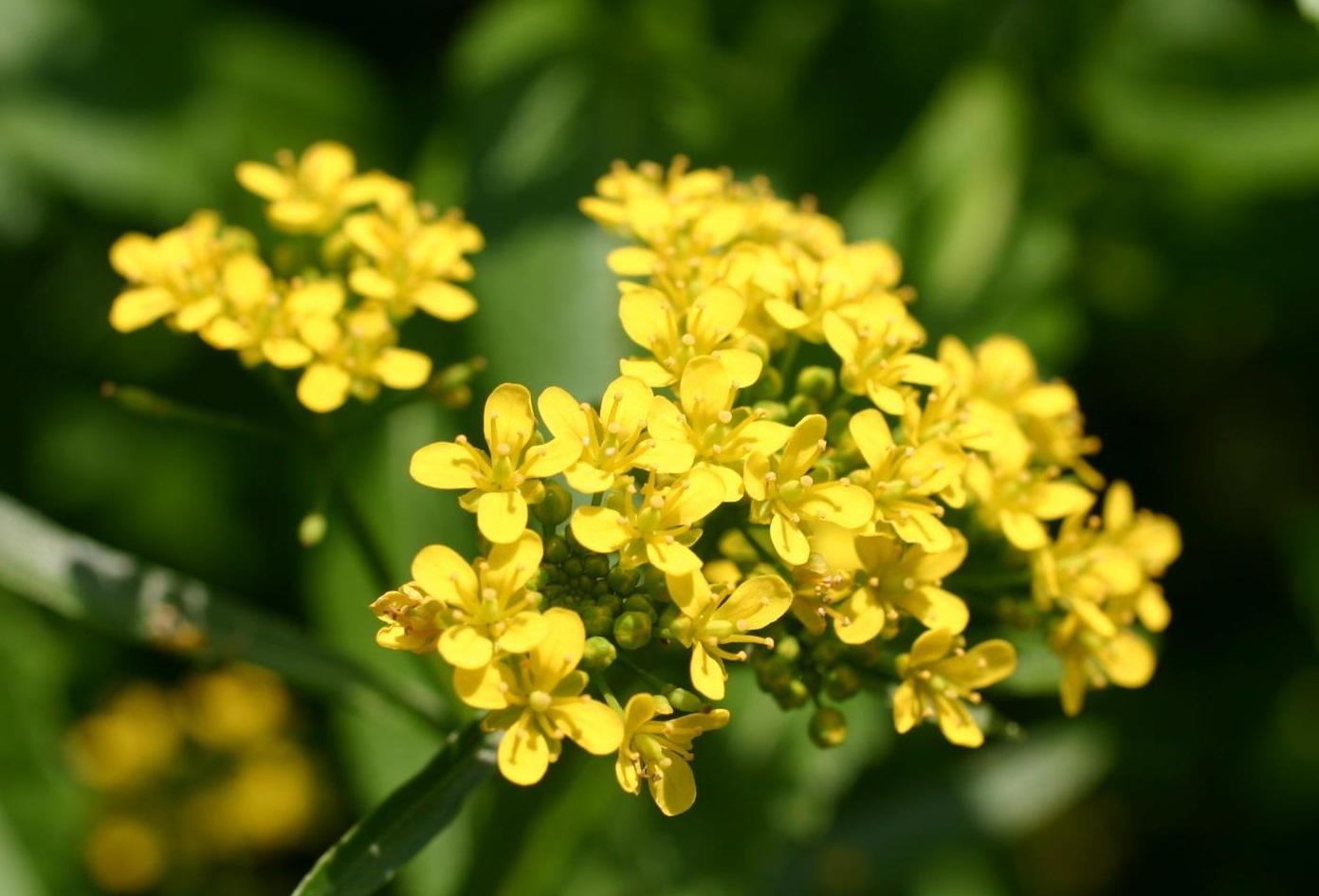
- Rorippa amphibia

Scientific classification
- Kingdom: Plantae
- Clade: Tracheophytes
- Clade: Angiosperms
- Clade: Eudicots
- Clade: Rosids
- Order: Brassicales
- Family: Brassicaceae
- Genus: Rorippa; Scop.

Species
- 75–87; see text

Synonyms
- Brachiolobos All.; Caroli-gmelina G.Gaertn., B.Mey. & Scherb.; Clandestinaria Spach; Kardanoglyphos Schltdl.; Leiolobium Rchb.; Neobeckia Greene; Radicula Moench; Roripa Adans.; Roripella (Maire) Greuter & Burdet; Sisymbrianthus Chevall.; Tetracellion Turcz. ex Fisch. & C.A.Mey.; Tetrapoma Turcz. ex Fisch. & C.A.Mey.; Trochiscus O.E.Schulz

= Rorippa =

Genus of flowering plants

Rorippa is a globally distributed genus in the family Brassicaceae, with species occurring on all continents except for Antarctica. Rorippa species are natively distributed in the Northern Hemisphere through Eurasia and North America, and dispersed into the Southern Hemisphere through long-distance dispersal. Rorippa species are annual to perennial herbs, usually with yellow flowers and a peppery flavour. They are known commonly as yellowcresses.

== Description ==
As a close relative of Arabidopsis, Rorippa has emerged as a group of valuable model organisms for investigating various biological processes. Researchers have utilized Rorippa to study developmental phenomena such as heterophylly, weediness, and vegetative regeneration. For example, heterophylly is the ability of plants to produce different leaf forms in response to contrasting environments, such as aerial or submerged conditions. This may incur anatomical or physiological changes and facilitate adaptation to the amphibious lifestyle in Rorippa,

Additionally, Rorippa has been employed to explore stress tolerance mechanisms, including responses to submergence, heavy metals, high-altitudes, and herbivory (specifically the mustard aphid). For example, Rorippa amphibia can escape submergence through elongation, while Rorippa sylvestris or Rorippa palustris can photosynthesize underwater and exhibits a hyponastic response (positive growth response to gravity), demonstrating a quiescence strategy (a period of reduced activity during unfavorable conditions).

Furthermore, Rorippa has served as a model system for studying biological invasion, with research focusing on evolutionary, ecological, and historical aspects.

== Ecology ==
Most Rorippa species thrive in moist or wet environments like ditches, meadows, waterfronts, and wetlands, highlighting their exceptional tolerance to flooding. This facilitates the dispersal of their seeds or vegetative propagules by floods over short to long ranges. For example, their fruits with seeds can remain viable for up to 60 days while floating in water. The aquatic or marshy habitats of Rorippa often overlap with those of migratory shorebirds, which could potentially carry seeds or fragments over long distances, establishing new populations far from the source. Furthermore, several adaptations, like the mucilage coating or hollows on their seeds, and their ability to self-fertilize and reproduce clonally, might also contribute to their long-distance dispersal.

Rorippa species are known for colonizing disturbed or wet areas first. They serve as valuable indicators of hydrophytic (water-loving) vegetation types. According to the National Wetland Plant List (NWPL) for the United States, several Rorippa species are classified as wetland indicators, with a high probability of occurring in Obligate (OBL) or Facultative Wetland (FACW) categories. For instance, nearly 55% of the 22 North American Rorippa species are categorized as OBL wetland indicators, highlighting their strong association with wet environments. This characteristic makes Rorippa plants a valuable tool for wetland establishment, restoration, and enhancement efforts.

== Example ==
Rorippa aquatica, a North American lakecress, is a valuable model organism for studying plant development and adaptation. It exhibits striking heterophylly, altering its leaf shape in response to environmental conditions like submergence, temperature, and light. In low-light submerged environments, for example, it develops finely dissected leaves. While in terrestrial conditions, it forms simple leaves with serrated edges. This leaf shape variation is controlled by the levels of plant hormones including gibberellin (GA) and ethylene, as well as the expression of specific genes, such as KNOX1 or RaSPCH/RaMUTE, providing an efficient way for leaves to absorb sunlight underwater. The species is also used to study vegetative propagation as it can regenerate from leaf fragments. Its close phylogenetic relationship to Arabidopsis thaliana and its recently sequenced allotetraploid genome make it a powerful tool for genetic and genomic research.

Rorippa elata is a type of plant that has adapted to live in high-altitude mountain environments. It can adjust its traits, like flowering time and chemical defenses, to survive in different conditions. The plant's ability to adapt is also linked to its polyploid nature, which seems to have played a role in its successful colonization of high-altitudes during periods of historical climate change.

Rorippa palustris, a short-lived and self-pollinating herb, is a ruderal weed that has expanded into disturbed wetland areas across the world. A key characteristic of R. palustris, and other ruderal plants, is its short life cycle. Genetic studies have shown that mutations in the CRY2 gene contribute to this early-flowering trait. These mutations lead to a constitutively active CRY2 protein, which overrides the need for vernalization (a cold period) and allows the plant to flower early, even under short-day conditions.

== List of species ==
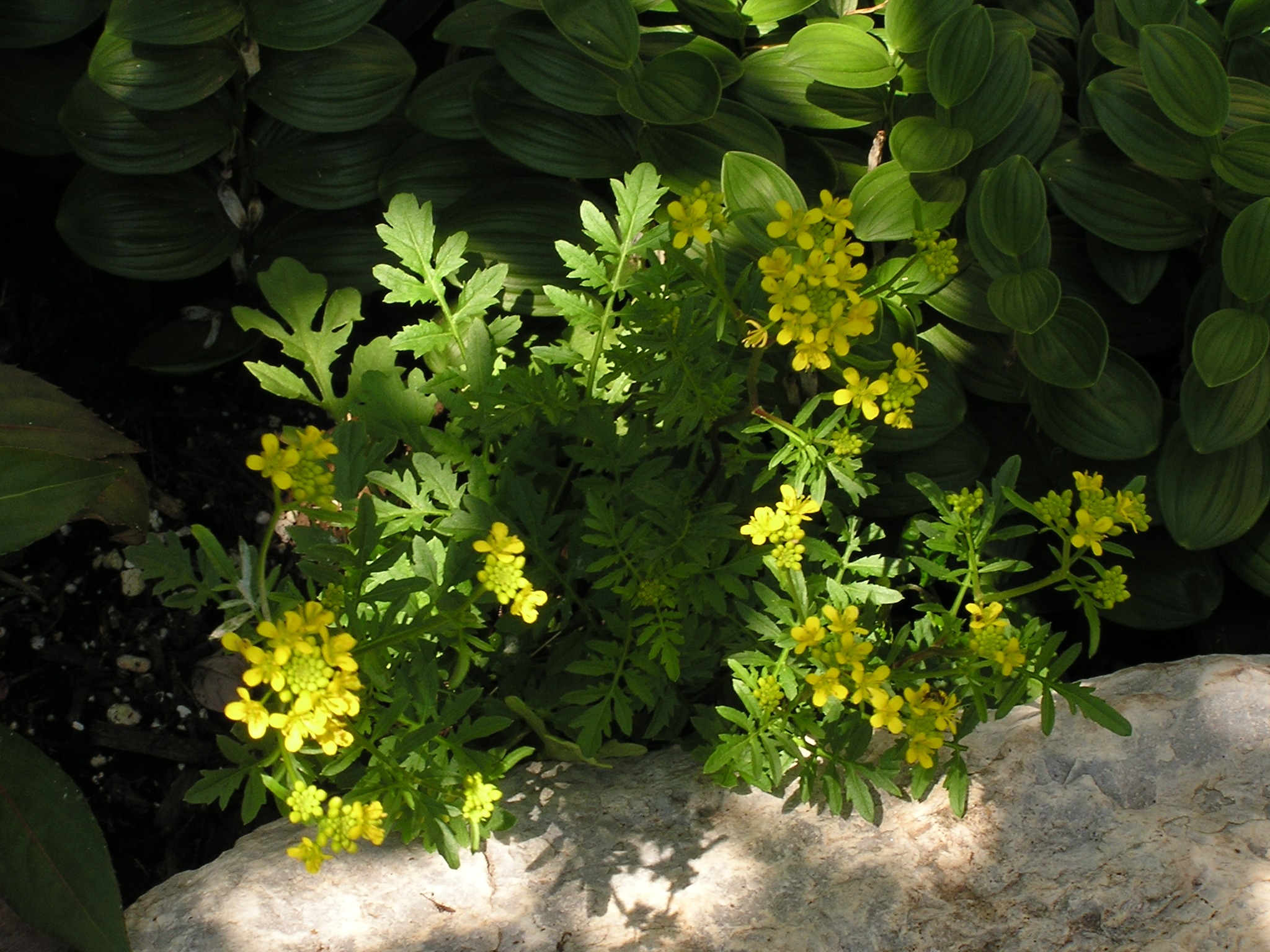
Rorippa sylvestris

There are about 75 to 87 species in the genus. About 70% of Rorippa are polyploids, and 90% of them are endemic to specific continents. A few of Rorippa species are widely distributed and invasive, including Rorippa amphibia, Rorippa dubia, Rorippa indica, Rorippa palustris, and Rorippa sylvestris. Plants of Rorippa palustris can be found globally, making it one of the most successful weeds in the world.

Plants of the World Online accepts 87 species.

- Rorippa africana (Braun-Blanq.) Maire
- Rorippa alpina (S.Wats.) Rydb. – alpine yellowcress
- Rorippa amphibia (L.) Bess. – great yellowcress
- Rorippa ampullicarpa V.I.Dorof.
- Rorippa × anceps (Wahlenb.) Rchb.
- Rorippa apetala Y.Y.Kim & B.U.Oh
- Rorippa aquatica (Eaton) E.J.Palmer & Steyerm. – lakecress
- Rorippa × armoracioides (Tausch) Fuss
- Rorippa × astyla (Rchb.) Rchb.
- Rorippa atlantica (Ball) Maire
- Rorippa aurea (Boiss. & Heldr.) Hub.-Mor.
- Rorippa austriaca (Crantz) Bess. – Austrian yellowcress, Austrian fieldgrass
- Rorippa austroamericana Mart.-Laborde
- Rorippa backeri (O.E. Schulz) Jonsell
- Rorippa barbareifolia (DC.) Kitagawa – hoary yellowcress
- Rorippa beckii Al-Shehbaz
- Rorippa behcetii İlçim
- Rorippa benghalensis (DC.) H.Hara
- Rorippa bonariensis (Poir.) Macloskie
- Rorippa brachycarpa (C.A.Mey.) Hayek
- Rorippa burkartii (Mart.-Laborde) Al-Shehbaz
- Rorippa calycina (Engel.) Rydb. – persistent-sepal yellowcress
- Rorippa cantoniensis (Lour.) Ohwi – Chinese yellowcress
- Rorippa chubutica (O.E.Schulz) Mart.-Laborde
- Rorippa clandestina (Spreng.) J.F.Macbr.
- Rorippa cochlearioides (Roth) Al-Shehbaz & Jonsell
- Rorippa columbiae (Suksd. ex B.L.Rob.) Howell – Columbian yellowcress, Columbia watercress
- Rorippa × complicata Nyár. & Prodan
- Rorippa coxii (F.Phil. ex Phil.) L.E.Navas
- Rorippa cryptantha (A.Rich.) Robyns & Boutique
- Rorippa crystallina Rollins – MacKenzie River yellowcress
- Rorippa curvipes Greene – bluntleaf yellowcress
- Rorippa curvisiliqua (Hook.) Besser ex Britton – curvepod yellowcress, western yellowcress
- Rorippa cygnorum Keighery
- Rorippa × danubialis Borbás
- Rorippa dictyosperma (Hook.) L.A.S.Johnson
- Rorippa dietrichiana Hewson
- Rorippa divaricata (Hook.f.) Garn.-Jones & Jonsell
- Rorippa dubia (Pers.) H.Hara
- Rorippa elata (Hook.f. & Thomson) Hand.-Mazz.
- Rorippa × erythrocaulis Borbás
- Rorippa eustylis (F.Muell.) L.A.S.Johnson
- Rorippa × filarszkyana (Prodan) Jáv.
- Rorippa fluviatilis (E.Mey. ex Sond.) Thell.
- Rorippa gigantea (Hook.) Garn.-Jones
- Rorippa globosa (Turcz. ex Fisch. & C.A.Mey.) Hayek – globe yellowcress
- Rorippa hayanica Maire
- Rorippa × haynaldiana Borbás
- Rorippa hengduanshanensis Q.J.Zheng, C.C.Yu, T.S.Han & Y.W.Xing
- Rorippa hilariana (Walp.) Cabrera
- Rorippa hispida (Desv.) Britton
- Rorippa × hungarica Borbás
- Rorippa hybosperma (O.E.Schulz) Jonsell
- Rorippa icarica Rech.f.
- Rorippa indica (L.) Hiern. – variableleaf yellowcress
- Rorippa insularis Jonsell
- Rorippa intermedia (Kuntze) Stuckey – intermediate yellowcress
- Rorippa islandica (Oeder) Borbás – northern yellowcress, northern marsh yellowcress
- Rorippa kerneri Menyh.
- Rorippa × kullodensis Prodan
- Rorippa kurdica (Boiss. & Hausskn.) Hedge
- Rorippa laciniata (O.E.Schulz) L.A.S.Johnson
- Rorippa × laeta Nyár. & Prodan
- Rorippa lippizensis (Wulfen) Rchb.
- Rorippa madagascariensis (DC.) H.Hara
- Rorippa mandonii (E.Fourn.) Mart.-Laborde
- Rorippa megasperma Stuckey
- Rorippa × menyharthiana Borbás
- Rorippa mexicana (Moc., Sessé & Cerv. ex DC.) Standl. & Steyerm.
- Rorippa micrantha (B.Heyne ex Roth) Jonsell
- Rorippa microtites (B.L.Rob.) Rollins – Chihuahuan yellowcress
- Rorippa millefolia (Baker) Jonsell
- Rorippa nana (Schltdl.) J.F.Macbr.
- Rorippa neocaledonica Jonsell
- Rorippa × neogradensis Borbás
- Rorippa nudiuscula (E.Mey. ex Sond.) Thell.
- Rorippa palustris (L.) Besser – common yellowcress, yellow watercress, marshcress
- Rorippa peekelii (O.E.Schulz) P.Royen
- Rorippa philippiana Macloskie
- Rorippa pinnata (Sessé & Moc.) Rollins
- Rorippa portoricensis (Spreng.) Stehlé – Puerto Rico yellowcress
- Rorippa prolifera (Heuff.) Neilr.
- Rorippa pyrenaica (All.) Rchb.
- Rorippa ramosa Rollins – Durango yellowcress
- Rorippa rosulata Charit.
- Rorippa sarmentosa (G.Forst. ex DC) J.F.Macbr. – longrunner
- Rorippa schlechteri (O.E.Schulz) P.Royen
- Rorippa sessiliflora (Nutt.) Hitchc. – stalkless yellowcress
- Rorippa sinuata (Nutt.) Hitchc. – spreading yellowcress, west yellowcress
- Rorippa spasskajae V.I.Dorof.
- Rorippa sphaerocarpa (A.Gray) Britton – roundfruit yellowcress
- Rorippa × stenophylla Borbás
- Rorippa subumbellata Rollins – Tahoe yellowcress, Lake Tahoe yellowcress
- Rorippa sylvestris (L.) Besser – creeping yellowcress, yellow fieldcress, keek
- Rorippa tenerrima Greene – Modoc yellowcress
- Rorippa teres (Michx.) Stuckey – southern marsh yellowcress
- Rorippa thracica (Griseb.) Fritsch
- Rorippa valdes-bermejoi (Castrov.) Mart.-Laborde & Castrov.
- Rorippa vallicola V.I.Dorof.
- Rorippa ventanensis Boelcke
- Rorippa × wislokiensis Zapał.
- Rorippa wolgensis Fursajev ex Laktionov & Mavrodiev
