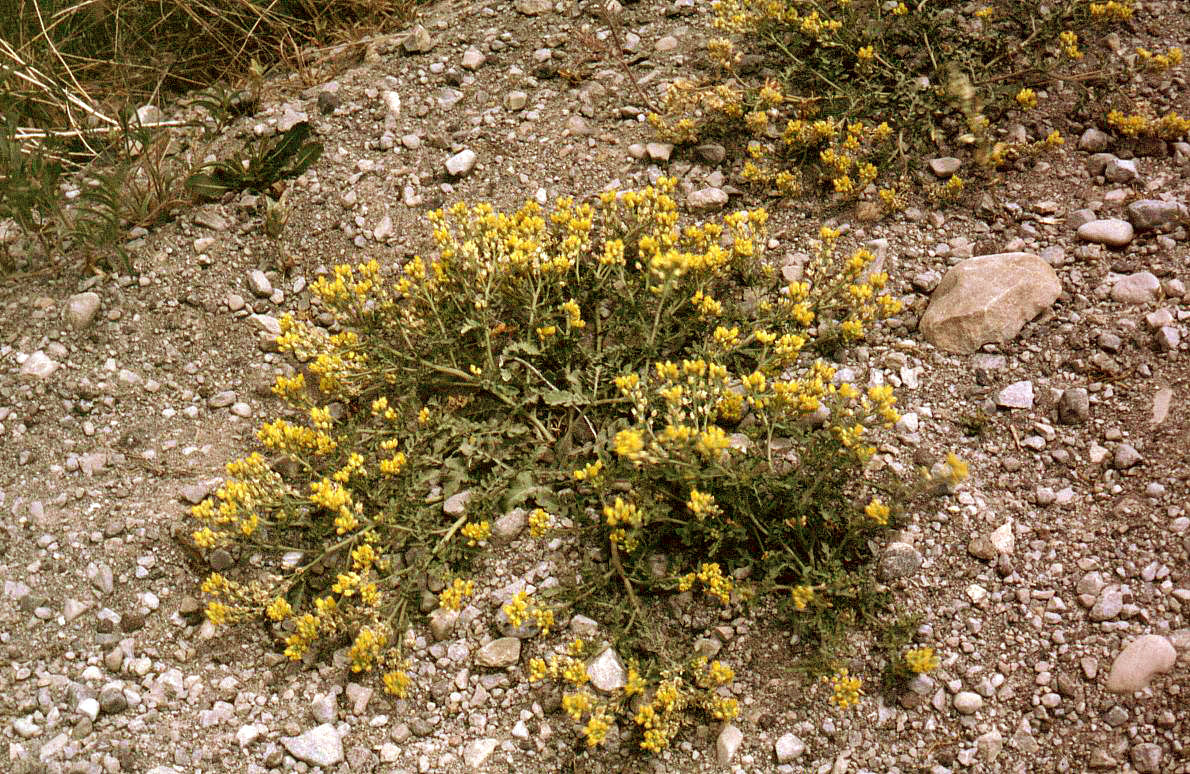

Scientific classification
- Kingdom: Plantae
- Clade: Tracheophytes
- Clade: Angiosperms
- Clade: Eudicots
- Clade: Rosids
- Order: Brassicales
- Family: Brassicaceae
- Genus: Rorippa
- Species: R. columbiae

Binomial name
- Rorippa columbiae (B.L.Rob.) Howell

= Rorippa columbiae =

Species of flowering plant

Rorippa columbiae is a species of flowering plant in the family Brassicaceae known by the common names Columbian yellowcress and Columbia yellow cress.

== Distribution ==
It is native to the western United States from central Washington to northeastern California, where it grows in moist to wet, sandy habitat types, such as playas (dry lakes). It is not a common plant; it is known from about fifteen occurrences in the Modoc Plateau region of California, it is a candidate for protection in Oregon, and it is state-listed as a threatened species in Washington.

== Description ==
Rorippa columbia is a perennial herb growing prostrate to erect, its densely hairy stems reaching 10 to 40 centimeters in maximum length.

The leaves are deeply lobed, the lobes sometimes cut all the way to the midrib. Lower leaves are borne on petioles; upper leaves have bases that clasp the stem.

The mustardlike flowers have small yellow petals. The fruit is a plump, hairy silique a few millimeters long containing many minute seeds.
