= Rorippa microtitis =

Scientific classification
- Kingdom: Plantae
- Clade: Tracheophytes
- Clade: Angiosperms
- Clade: Eudicots
- Clade: Rosids
- Order: Brassicales
- Family: Brassicaceae
- Genus: Rorippa
- Species: R. microtitis

Binomial name
- Rorippa microtitis (B.L.Rob.) Rollins

Synonyms
- Nasturtium microtites (B.L. Rob.) O.E. Schulz; Sisymbrium microtites B.L. Rob.

Species of flowering plant

Rorippa microtitis, the Chihuahuan yellowcress, is a plant species native to Chihuahua, Arizona and New Mexico. It is widespread in Arizona but has been recorded from only one county in New Mexico (Catron).

Rorippa microtitis is a branched, glabrous herb up to 60 cm tall. It has deeply divided pinnatifid leaves. Flowers are yellow, borne in racemes. The species grows in wet places such as lake shores, bogs, meadows, stream banks, etc., at elevations of 1700–2300 m.
