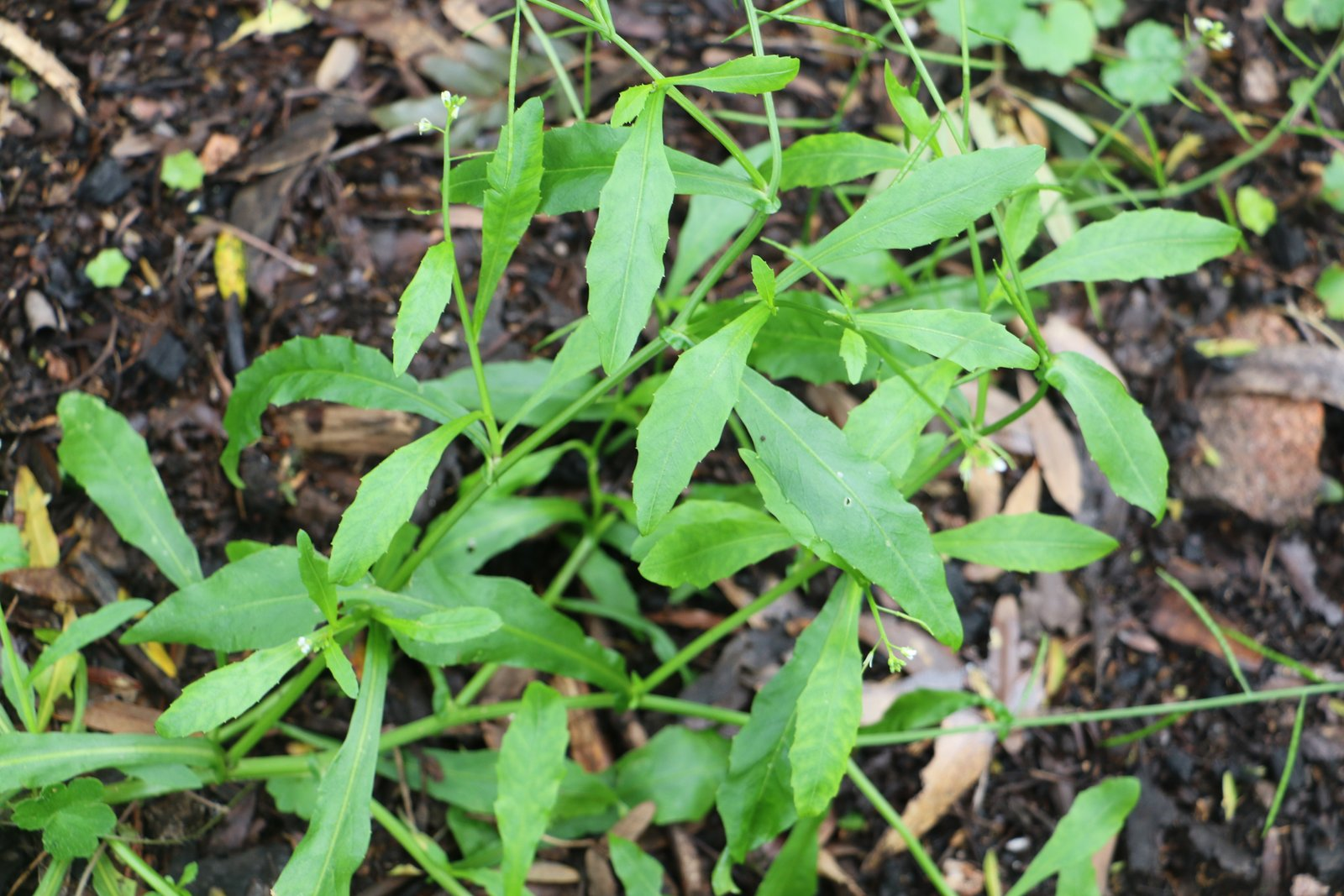
- Monga National Park, Australia

Scientific classification
- Kingdom: Plantae
- Clade: Tracheophytes
- Clade: Angiosperms
- Clade: Eudicots
- Clade: Rosids
- Order: Brassicales
- Family: Brassicaceae
- Genus: Rorippa
- Species: R. gigantea

Binomial name
- Rorippa gigantea (Hook) Garn.-Jones

Synonyms
- Arabis gigantea Hook.

= Rorippa gigantea =

Forest Bitter-Cress

Species of flowering plant

Rorippa gigantea is a species of plant in the cabbage family Brassicaceae. The forest bitter-cress is usually seen as an annual plant, growing to 120 cm high, found in Australian east coast forests.

== Gallery ==
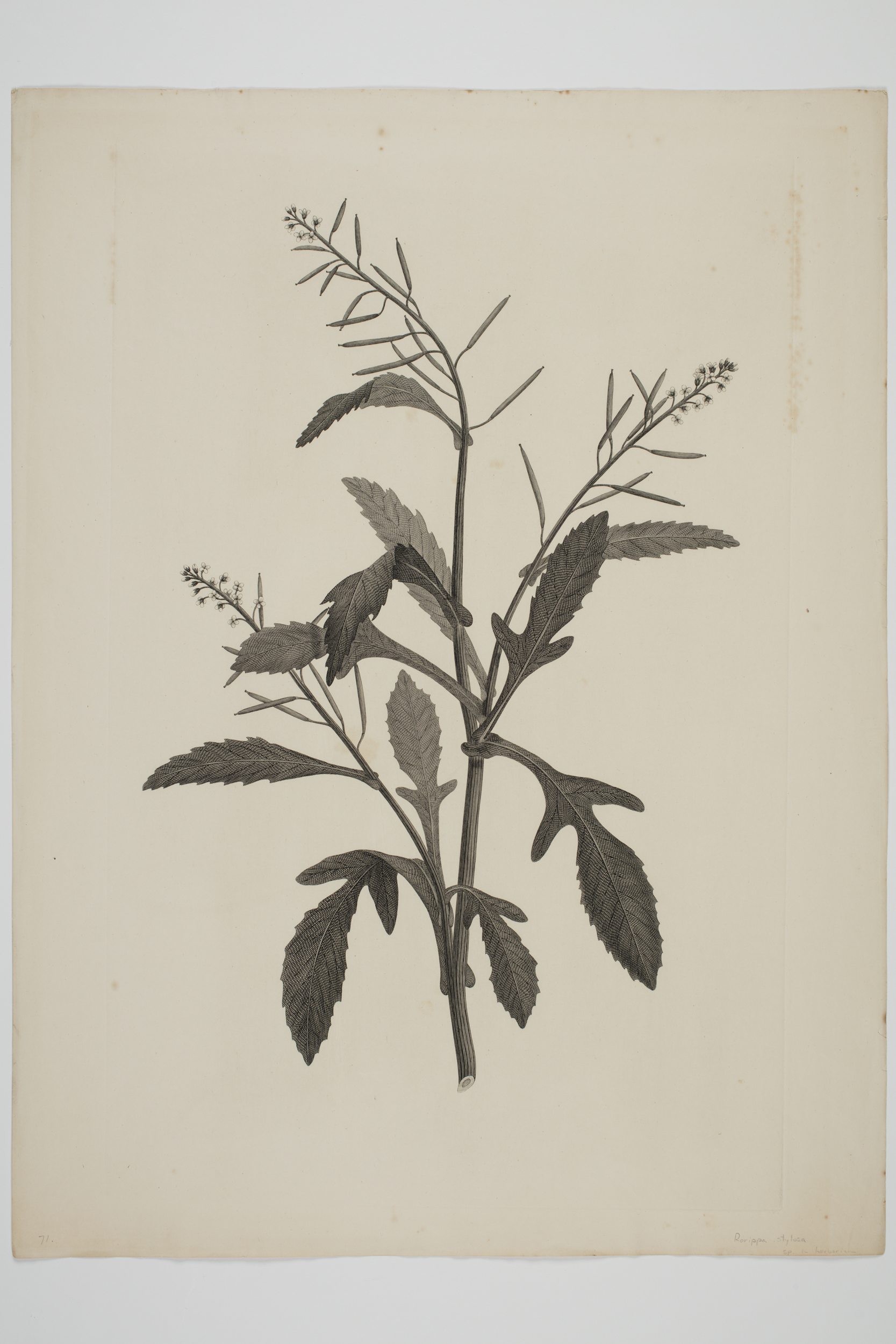
1895 engraving of R. gigantea by Sydney Parkinson

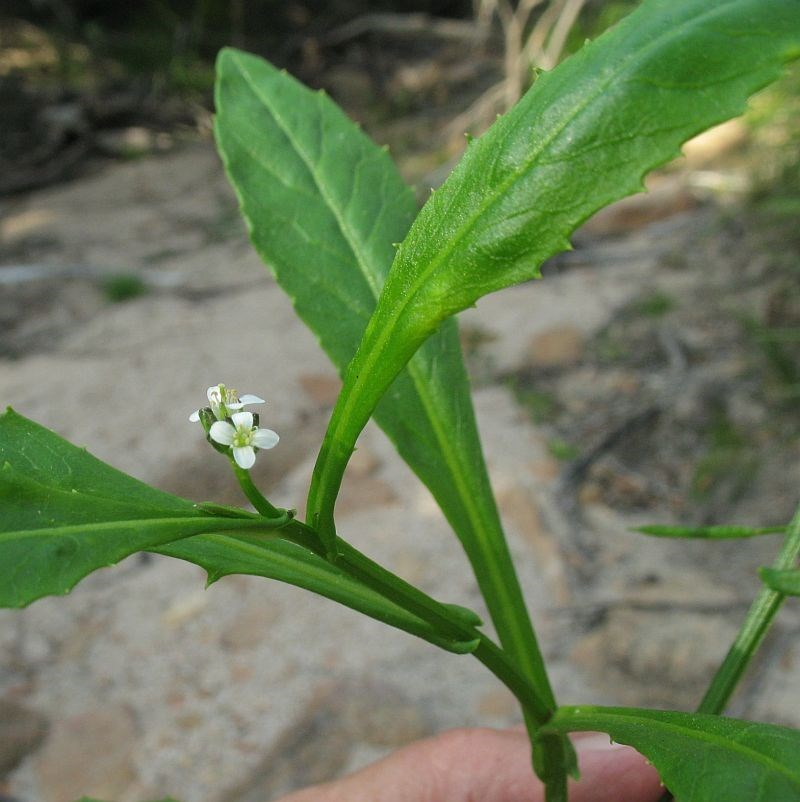
R. gigantea found on the banks of the Wallagaraugh River, southeastern New South Wales

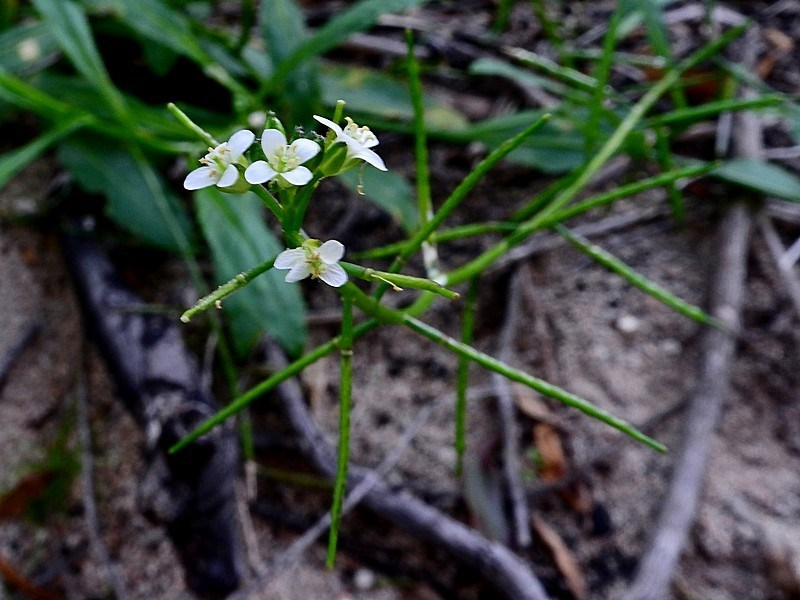
Close-up of flowers
