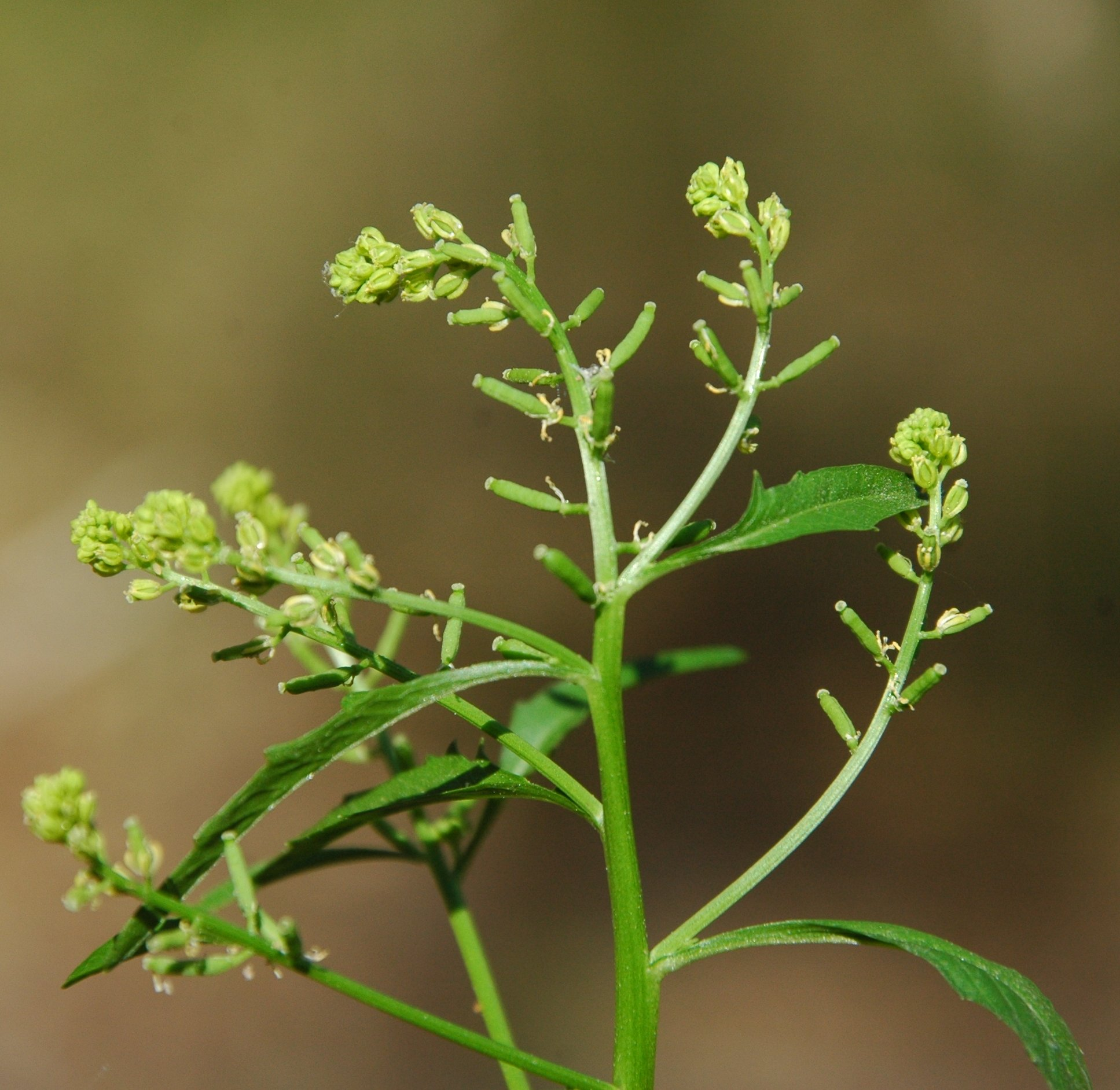

Scientific classification
- Kingdom: Plantae
- Clade: Tracheophytes
- Clade: Angiosperms
- Clade: Eudicots
- Clade: Rosids
- Order: Brassicales
- Family: Brassicaceae
- Genus: Rorippa
- Species: R. sessiliflora

Binomial name
- Rorippa sessiliflora (Nutt.) Hitchc.

= Rorippa sessiliflora =

Species of flowering plant

Rorippa sessiliflora, commonly known as stalkless yellowcress, is a species of flowering plant in the family Brassicaceae (conserved name Cruciferae) .

== Distribution ==
Rorippa sessiliflora is native to midwestern and eastern United States from South Dakota south to Texas and east from Maryland south through Florida. The species is more frequent in the midwest than southeast. The northerly distribution limit coincides with the southern edge of the Wisconsin glaciation, with the occasional collections from previously glaciated areas further north and in Massachusetts possibly attributable to anthropogenic dispersal.

== Habitat ==
The species grows in areas that are muddy and subject to disturbance, such as on banks of streams, ponds and lakes, as well as on roadsides, and fallow fields.

== Description ==
Rorippa sessiliflora is glabrous (hairless) annual with erect stems and whose species epithet "sessiliflora" refers to the plant's short pedicels, between 0.5 – 2 mm in length. Stuckey notes other distinctive features for this species as compared to other members of the genus Rorippa, including thick siliques that are wedge-shaped at the base. Although some sources note the absence of petals, Radford et al. suggest the presence of diminutive petals less than 1.5 mm long. Stuckey indicates that the flowers may deviate from typical traits of crucifers, with variable numbers of stamen (3–6) within a plant and occasional anther fusion.
