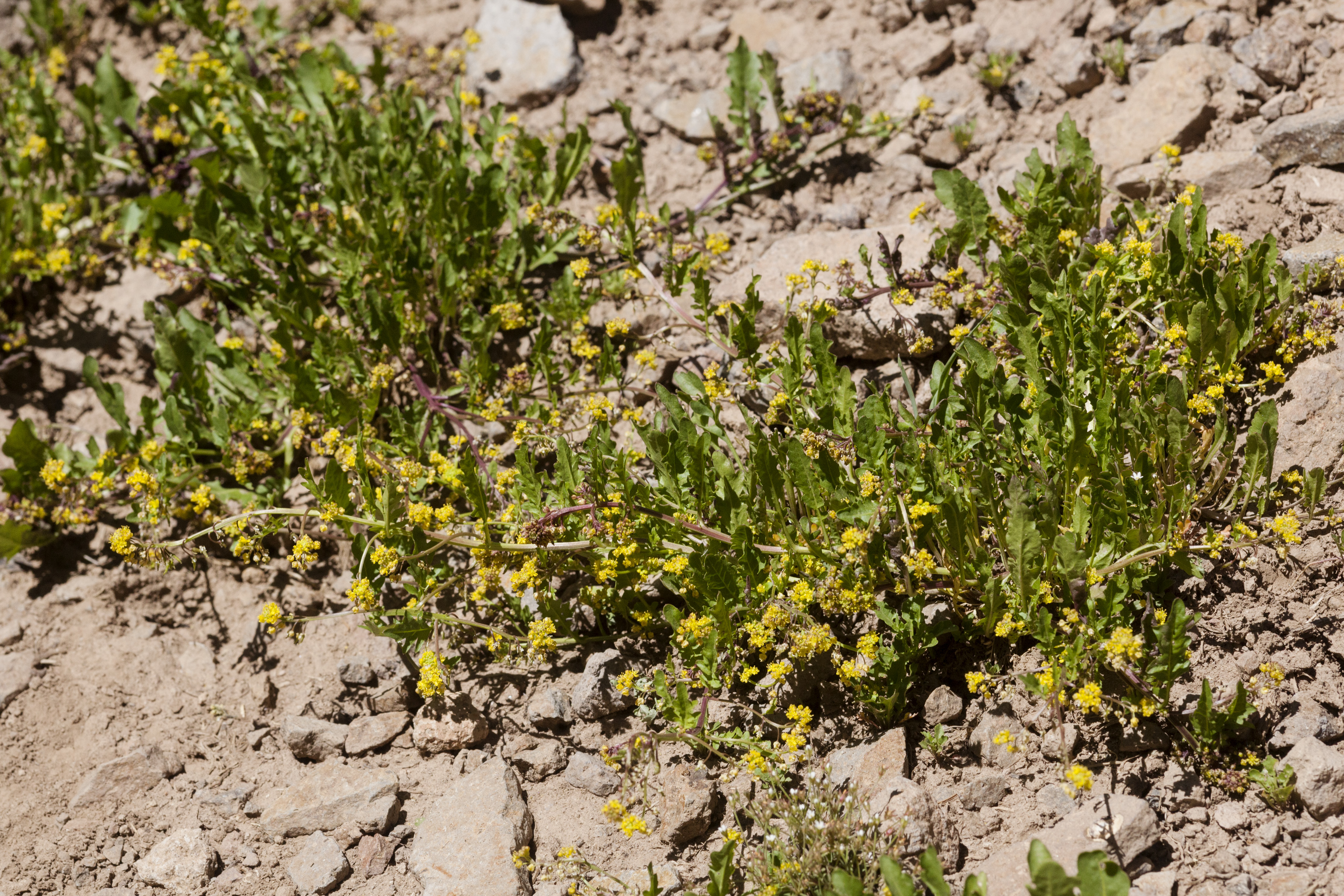

Conservation status
- Secure (NatureServe)

Scientific classification
- Kingdom: Plantae
- Clade: Tracheophytes
- Clade: Angiosperms
- Clade: Eudicots
- Clade: Rosids
- Order: Brassicales
- Family: Brassicaceae
- Genus: Rorippa
- Species: R. curvipes

Binomial name
- Rorippa curvipes Greene

= Rorippa curvipes =

Species of flowering plant

Rorippa curvipes is a species of flowering plant in the family Brassicaceae known by the common name bluntleaf yellowcress. It is native to much of western North America from Alaska to Mexico to the Mississippi River, where it can be found in various types of moist and wet habitat, including lakeshores and riverbanks, meadows, roadsides, mudflats, and irrigation ditches. It is an annual or perennial herb, producing several stems growing prostrate along the ground or somewhat upright, measuring 10 centimeters to around half a meter in maximum length. The leaves are long and narrow, smooth edged or lobed, the lobes sometimes cut all the way to the midrib or separated to form leaflets. Lower leaves are borne on petioles; upper leaves have bases that clasp the stem. The mustardlike flowers have very small yellow petals. The fruit is a plump, hairless silique containing many minute seeds.
