= Rorippa barbareifolia =

Scientific classification
- Kingdom: Plantae
- Clade: Tracheophytes
- Clade: Angiosperms
- Clade: Eudicots
- Clade: Rosids
- Order: Brassicales
- Family: Brassicaceae
- Genus: Rorippa
- Species: R. barbareifolia

Binomial name
- Rorippa barbareifolia (DC.) Kitag.

Synonyms
- Camelina barbareifolia DC.; Nasturtium barbareifolium (DC.) B. Fedtsch.; Radicula barbareifolia (DC.) W. Wight ex P.S. Smith; Rorippa barbareaefolia (DC.) A.E. Porsild; Rorippa hispida var. barbareifolia (DC.) Hultén; Rorippa islandica var. barbareifolia (DC.) S.L. Welsh; Tetrapoma barbareifolium (DC.) Turcz. ex Fisch. & C.A. Mey.; Tetrapoma kruhsianum Fisch. & C.A. Mey.; Tetrapoma pyriforme Seem.

Species of flowering plant

Rorippa barbareifolia, the hoary yellowcress, is a plant species reported from Manchuria, Inner Mongolia, Mongolia, Siberia, Alaska, Yukon and Saskatchewan. It grows in wet habitats (though not completely submerged). It can be found along forest borders, in ditches, on stream banks, etc.

Rorippa barbareifolia can easily be distinguished from other species in the genus by its multi-valved fruits. Rorippa barbareifolia fruits have 3-6 valves, usually 4, while other species generally have 2, rarely 3. The plants are annual herbs with yellow, 4-parted flowers.
