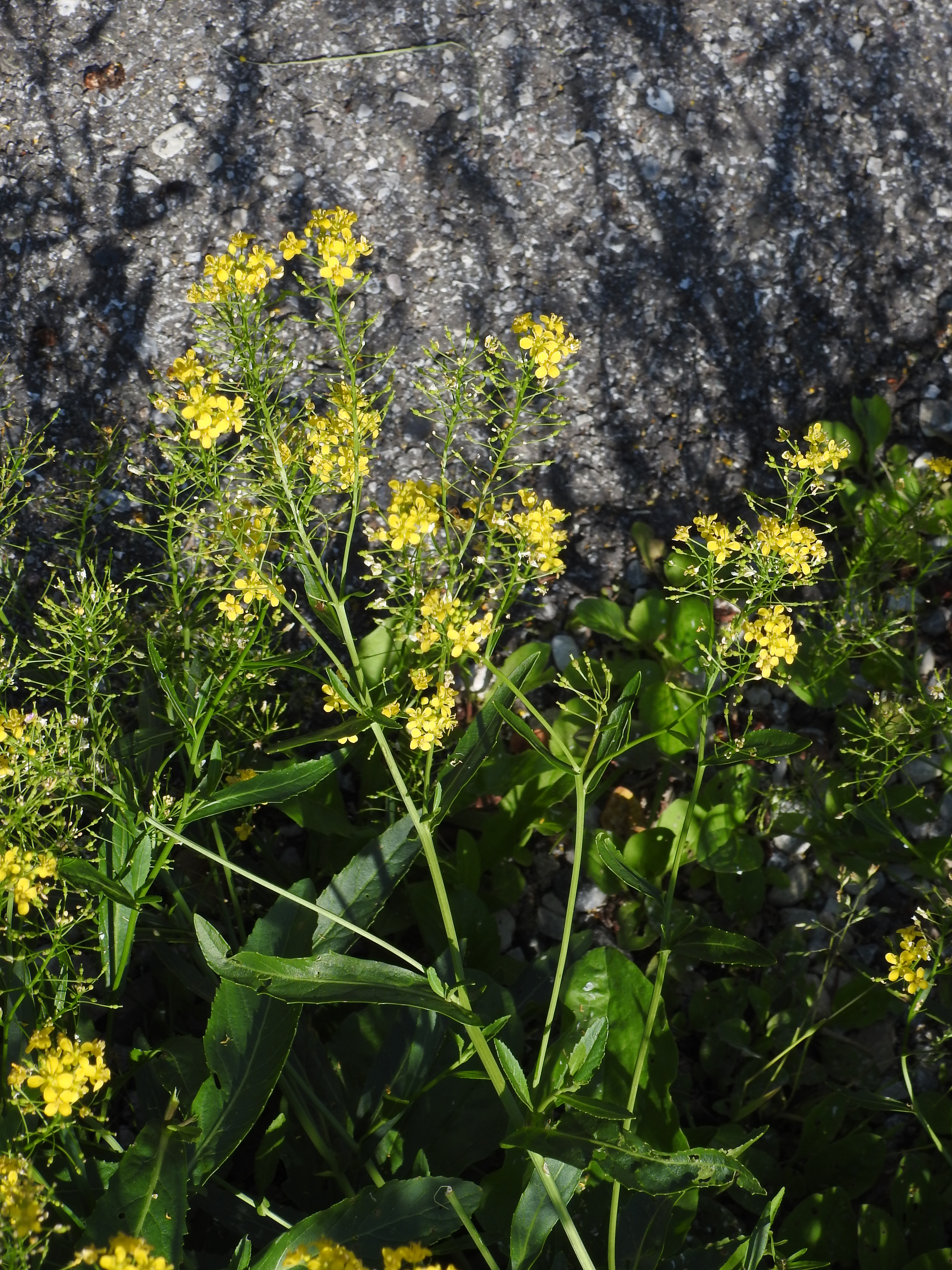

Scientific classification
- Kingdom: Plantae
- Clade: Embryophytes
- Clade: Tracheophytes
- Clade: Spermatophytes
- Clade: Angiosperms
- Clade: Eudicots
- Clade: Rosids
- Order: Brassicales
- Family: Brassicaceae
- Genus: Rorippa
- Species: R. austriaca

Binomial name
- Rorippa austriaca (Crantz) Besser

= Rorippa austriaca =

Species of flowering plant

Rorippa austriaca is a species of flowering plant in the family Brassicaceae known by the common names Austrian yellow-cress and Austrian fieldcress. It is native to parts of Europe and Asia, and it is known in North America as an introduced species and sometimes a noxious weed. It can grow in disturbed habitat, such as roadsides, and in very wet habitat such as mudflats. It is a perennial herb growing upright to erect, reaching a maximum height near one meter. The branching stem bears hairless blue-green lance-shaped leaves up to 10 centimeters long. The bases of the upper leaves clasp the stem. The inflorescence is a raceme at the top of the stem and the ends of stem branches. The mustardlike flowers have small yellow petals. The fruit is a plump silique a few millimeters long, but many plants do not fruit and seed production is rare. Reproduction in this species is more often vegetative, the plants concentrating their growth in belowground tissue and spreading clonally. The root system of the plant is particularly aggressive, sending up many new plants as it spreads.
