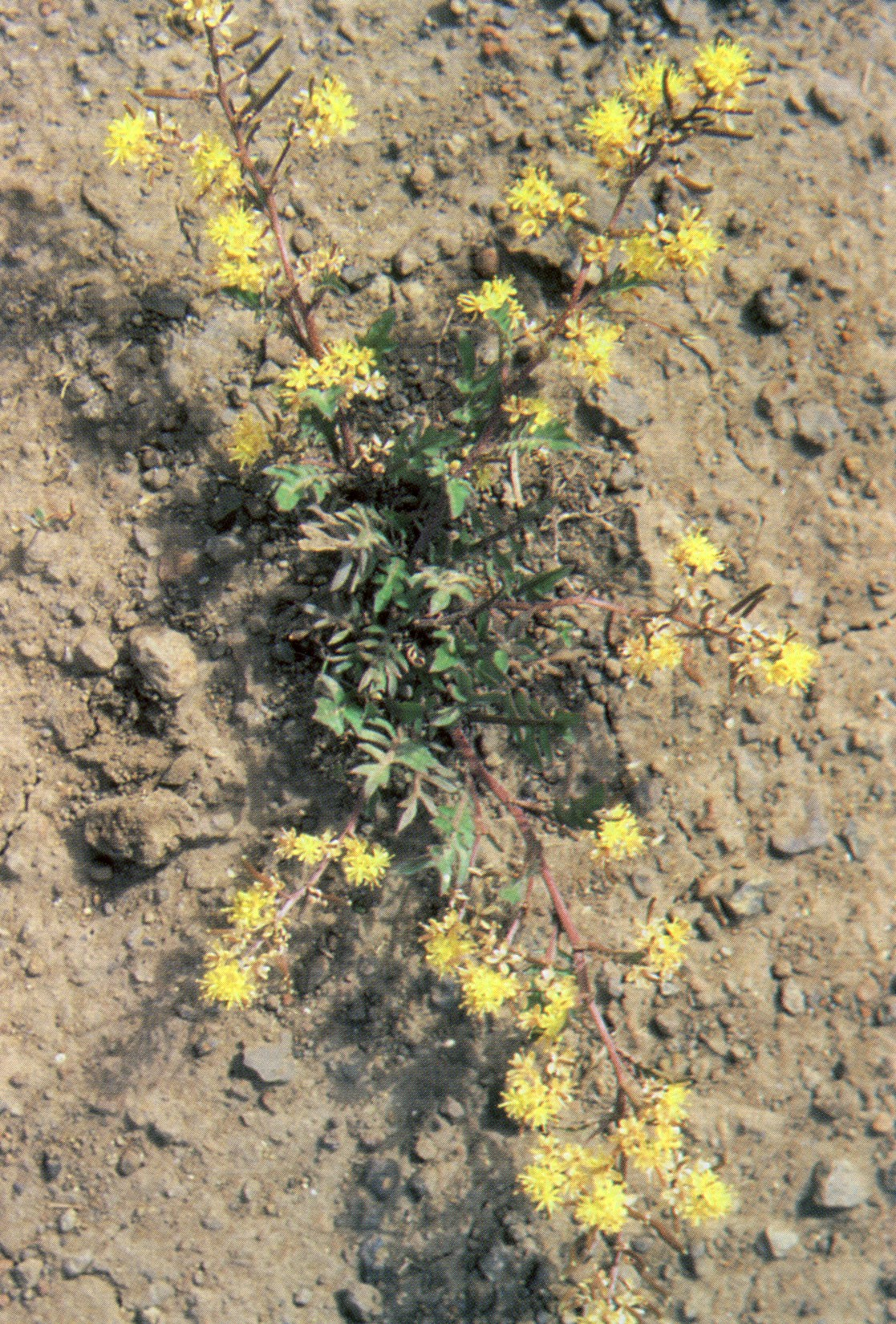

Conservation status
- Secure (NatureServe)

Scientific classification
- Kingdom: Plantae
- Clade: Tracheophytes
- Clade: Angiosperms
- Clade: Eudicots
- Clade: Rosids
- Order: Brassicales
- Family: Brassicaceae
- Genus: Rorippa
- Species: R. sinuata

Binomial name
- Rorippa sinuata (Nutt.) Hitchc.

= Rorippa sinuata =

Species of flowering plant

Rorippa sinuata is a species of flowering plant in the family Brassicaceae known by the common name spreading yellowcress. It is native to North America, including most all of the western and central United States, where it grows in many types of moist and wet habitat, such as lakeshores and riverbanks, meadows, and mudflats. It is a perennial herb producing spreading stems up to 40 or 50 centimeters long. It is densely hairy, the hairs rounded like sacs or vesicles. The leaves are up to 8 centimeters long and have blades are deeply toothed, lobed, or divided into smaller leaflets. The inflorescence is an elongated raceme occupying the top portion of the stem containing many tiny yellow flowers just a few millimeters long. The fruit is a curved silique which is variable in size and shape but generally contains many minute seeds.

== Uses ==
The Zuni people use an infusion of plant used as a wash and smoke from the blossoms is used for inflamed eyes.
