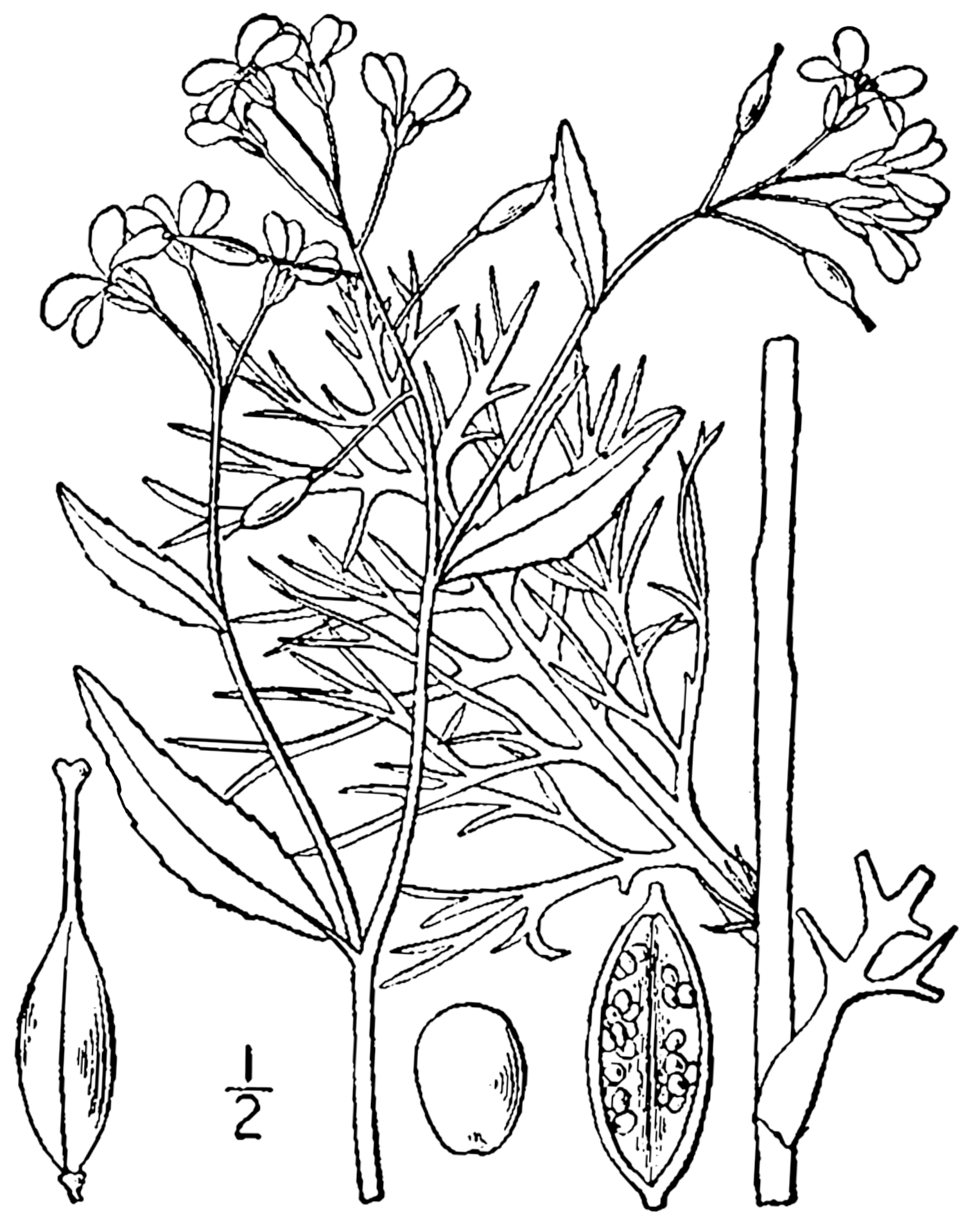
- Botanical illustration

Scientific classification
- Kingdom: Plantae
- Clade: Tracheophytes
- Clade: Angiosperms
- Clade: Eudicots
- Clade: Rosids
- Order: Brassicales
- Family: Brassicaceae
- Genus: Rorippa
- Species: R. aquatica

Binomial name
- Rorippa aquatica (Eaton) E.J.Palmer & Steyerm.

Synonyms
- List: Armoracia americana (A.Gray) Hook. & Arn.; Armoracia aquatica (Eaton) Wiegand; Armoracia aquatica f. capillifolia Vict. & J.Rousseau; Armoracia lacustris (A.Gray) Al-Shehbaz & V.Bates; Cochlearia aquatica (Eaton) Eaton; Cochlearia armoracia var. aquatica Eaton; Nasturtium lacustre A.Gray; Nasturtium natans Hook.; Nasturtium natans var. americanum A.Gray; Nasturtium natans var. brevistylum Torr. & A.Gray; Neobeckia aquatica (Eaton) Greene; Radicula aquatica (Eaton) B.L.Rob.; Rorippa americana (A.Gray) Britton

= Rorippa aquatica =

Species of plant

Rorippa aquatica (syns. Neobeckia aquatica and Armoracia lacustris), the lakecress or lake cress, is a species of freshwater aquatic flowering plant in the family Brassicaceae. It is found in eastern and central North America, generally in the Great Lakes and Mississippi watersheds. A submerged perennial, it has emergent flowering branches. It is typically found in slow-moving water, such as oxbow lakes. It is used as a foreground aquarium plant, as it is undemanding and very slow-growing.
