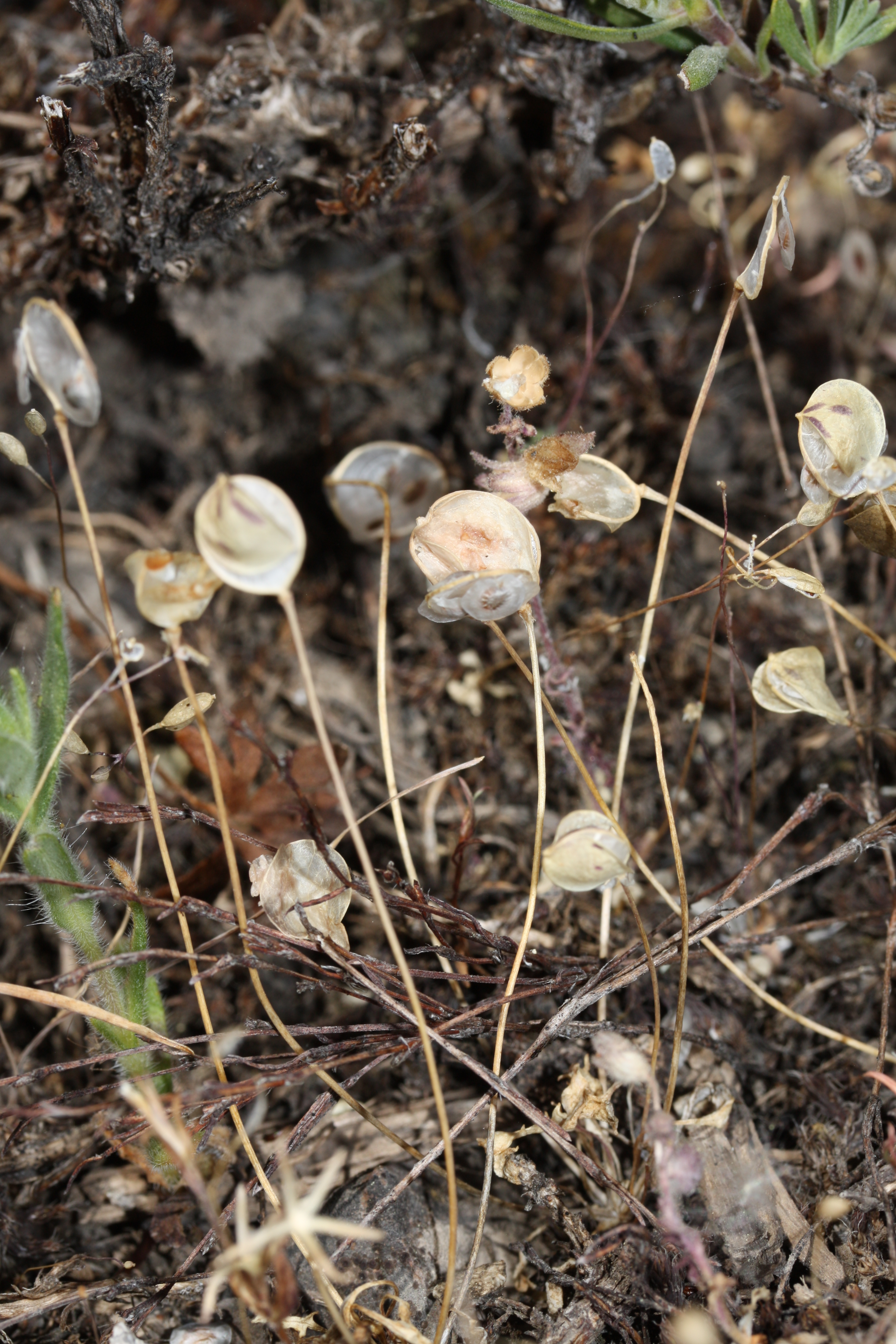
- Idahoa scapigera in Wenas Wildlife Area

Scientific classification
- Kingdom: Plantae
- Clade: Tracheophytes
- Clade: Angiosperms
- Clade: Eudicots
- Clade: Rosids
- Order: Brassicales
- Family: Brassicaceae
- Genus: Idahoa; A.Nels. & J.F.Macbr.
- Species: I. scapigera

Binomial name
- Idahoa scapigera (Hook.) A.Nels. & J.F.Macbr.

= Idahoa =

Genus of flowering plants

Idahoa is a monotypic genus of plants in the family Brassicaceae containing the single species Idahoa scapigera, which is known by the common names scalepod and oldstem idahoa. It is native to western North America from British Columbia to California to Montana where it grows generally in mountains and foothills. This is a petite annual herb growing a basal rosette of petioled leaves each one to three centimeters long and smooth or lobed along the edges. The thin, leafless erect stems rise to a maximum height near ten centimeters. Each bears a single tiny flower with white petals above red-purple sepals. The fruit is a flat, round capsule, shaped like a disc or somewhat oval, and 6 to 12 millimeters wide. The green fruit dries to a papery gray or white.

== Gallery ==
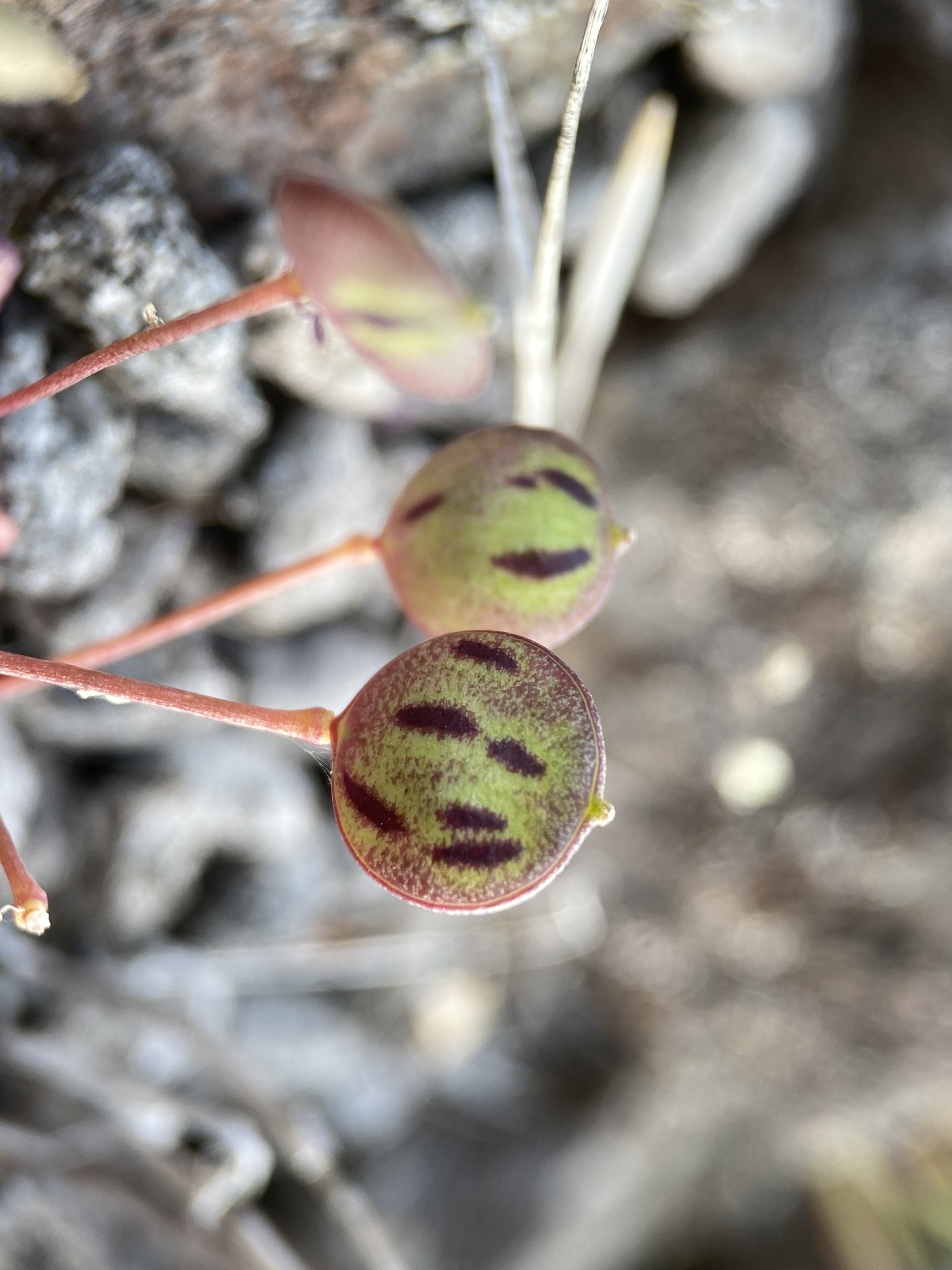
Idahoa scapigera developing fruit

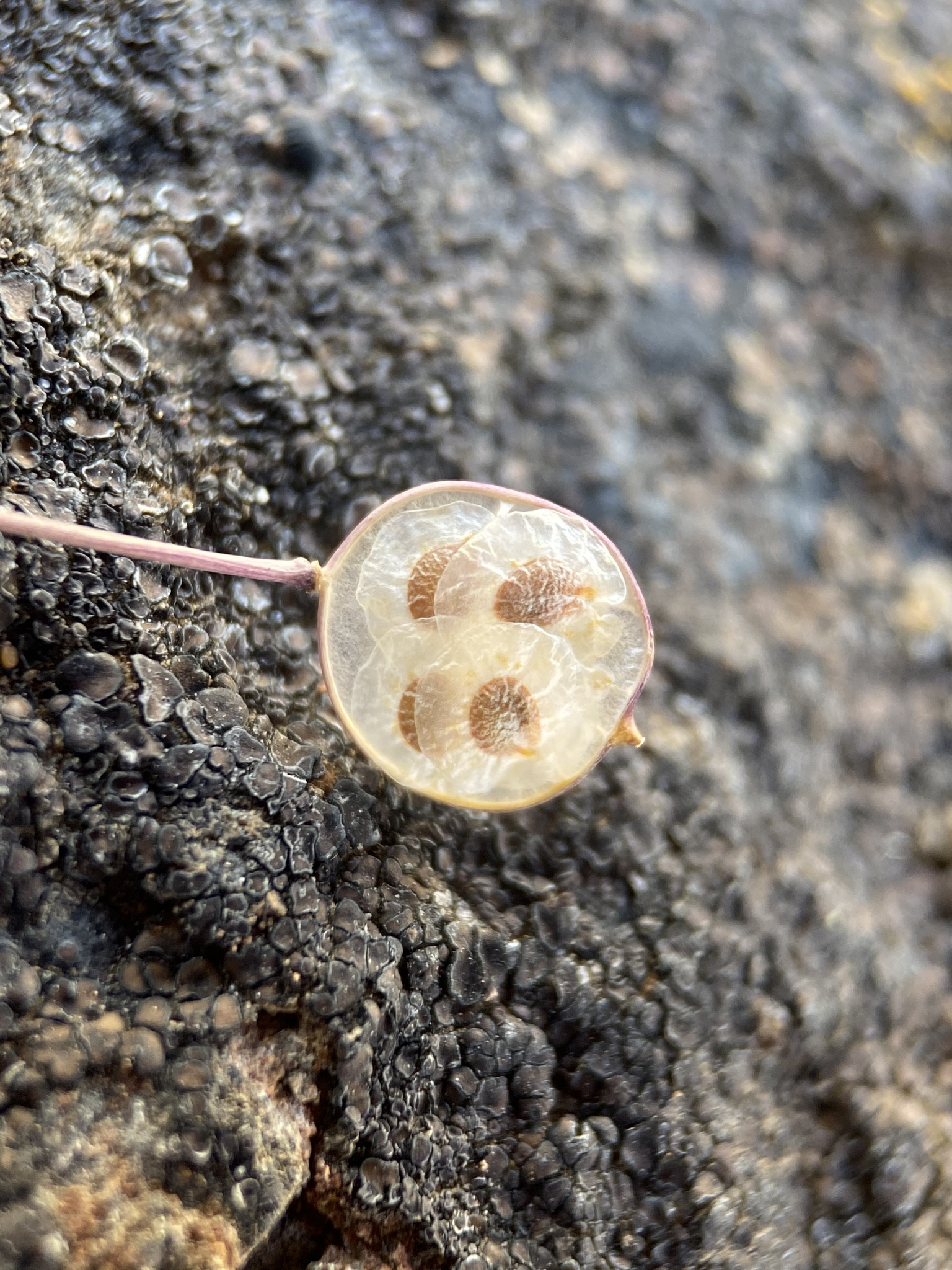
Idahoa scapigera mature dried fruit

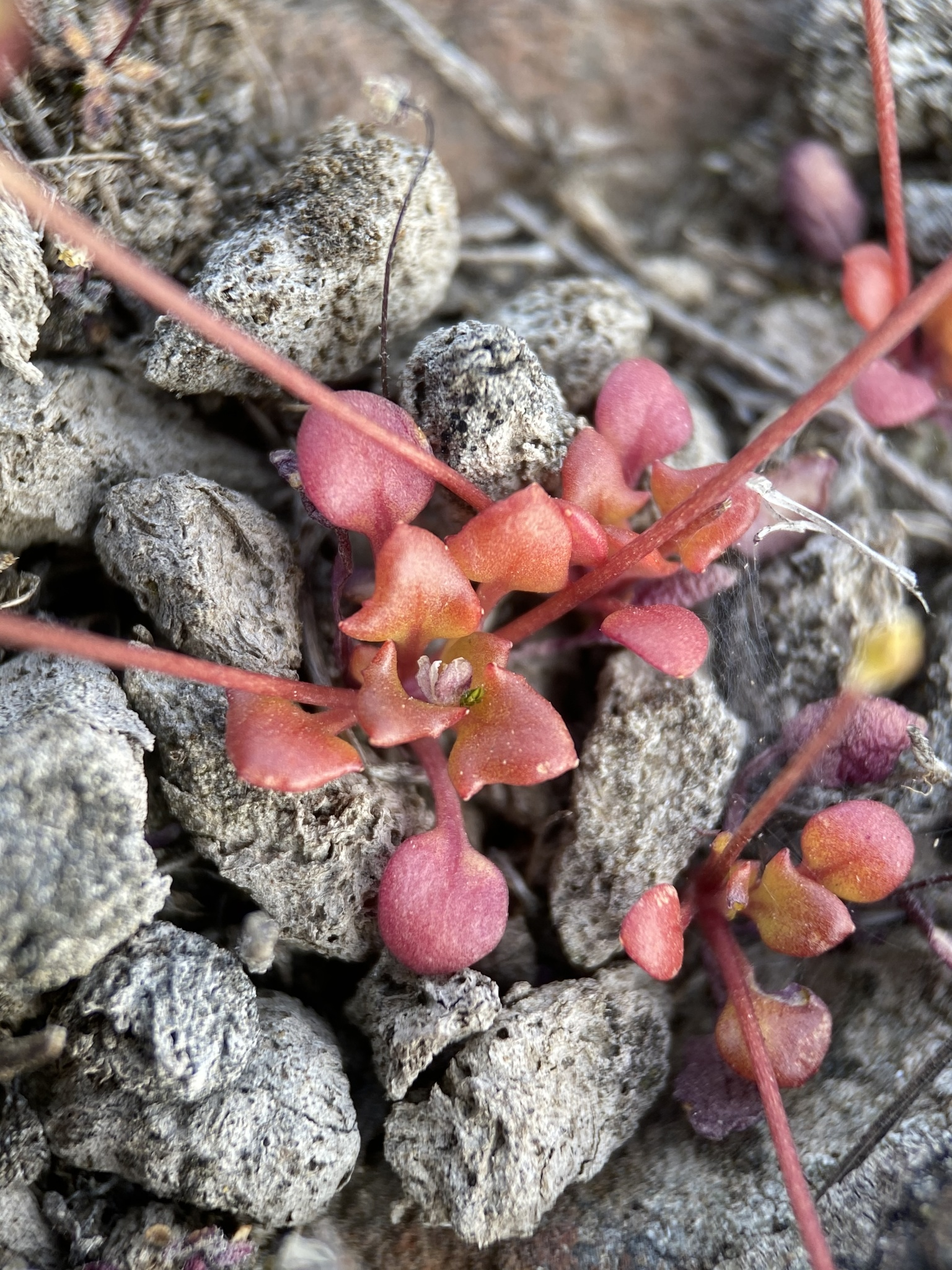
Idahoa scapigera tiny basal leaves
