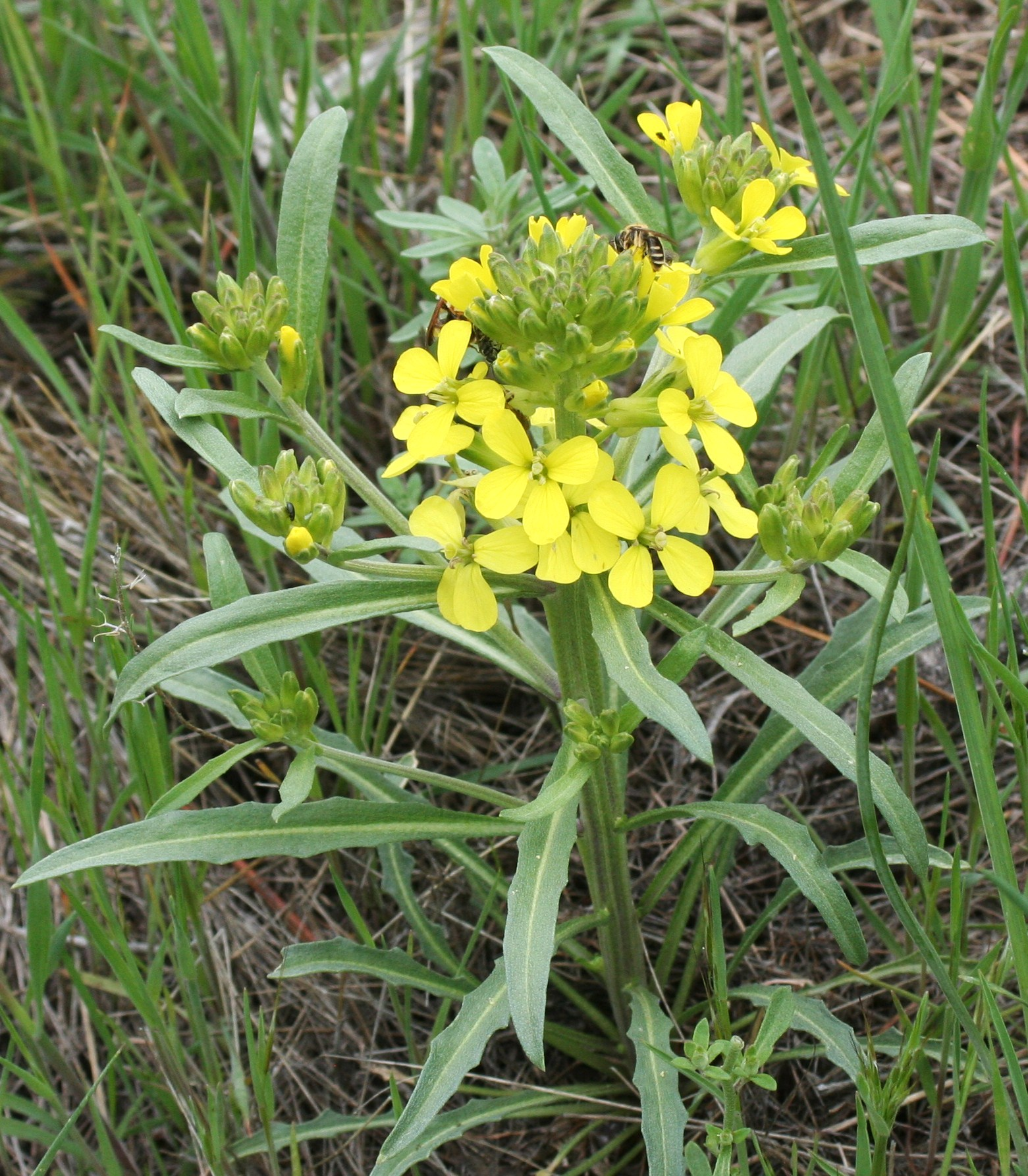
- In bloom
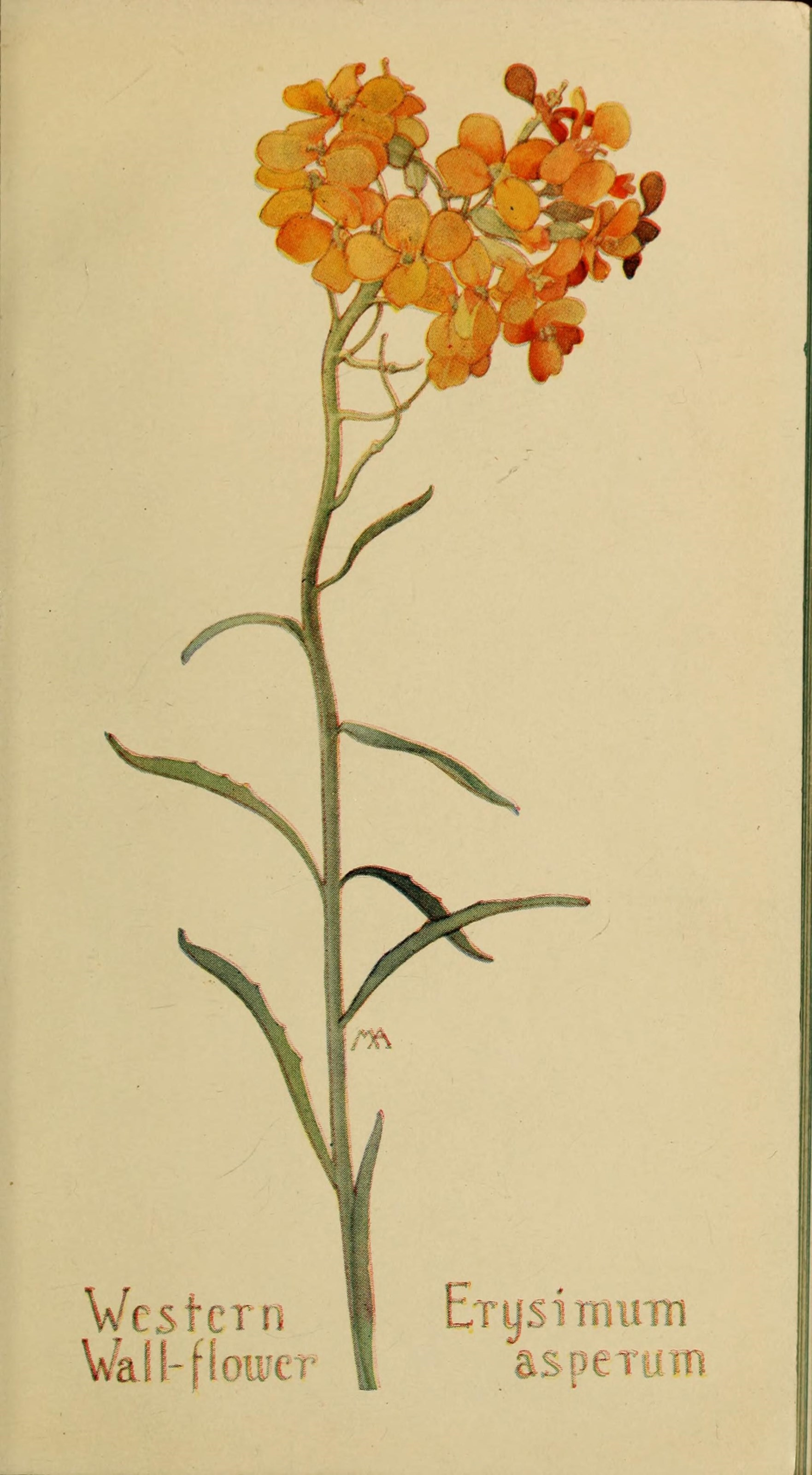
- Watercolor by Margaret Neilson Armstrong

Conservation status
- Secure (NatureServe)

Scientific classification
- Kingdom: Plantae
- Clade: Tracheophytes
- Clade: Angiosperms
- Clade: Eudicots
- Clade: Rosids
- Order: Brassicales
- Family: Brassicaceae
- Genus: Erysimum
- Species: E. asperum

Binomial name
- Erysimum asperum (Nutt.) DC.

Synonyms
- List: Cheiranthus asper Nutt.; Cheirinia aspera (Nutt.) Rydb.; Erysimum asperum var. dolichocarpum O.E.Schulz; Erysimum asperum f. nanum Cockerell; Erysimum lanceolatum Pursh

= Erysimum asperum =

Plant species in the cabbage family

Erysimum asperum, the western wallflower (a name it shares with Erysimum capitatum), is a species of flowering plant in the family Brassicaceae. It is native to west-central Canada, the west-central United States, and northern Mexico; in grasslands generally east of the Continental Divide and west of the Mississippi. It is a member of the Erysimum asperum-E. capitatum species complex.
