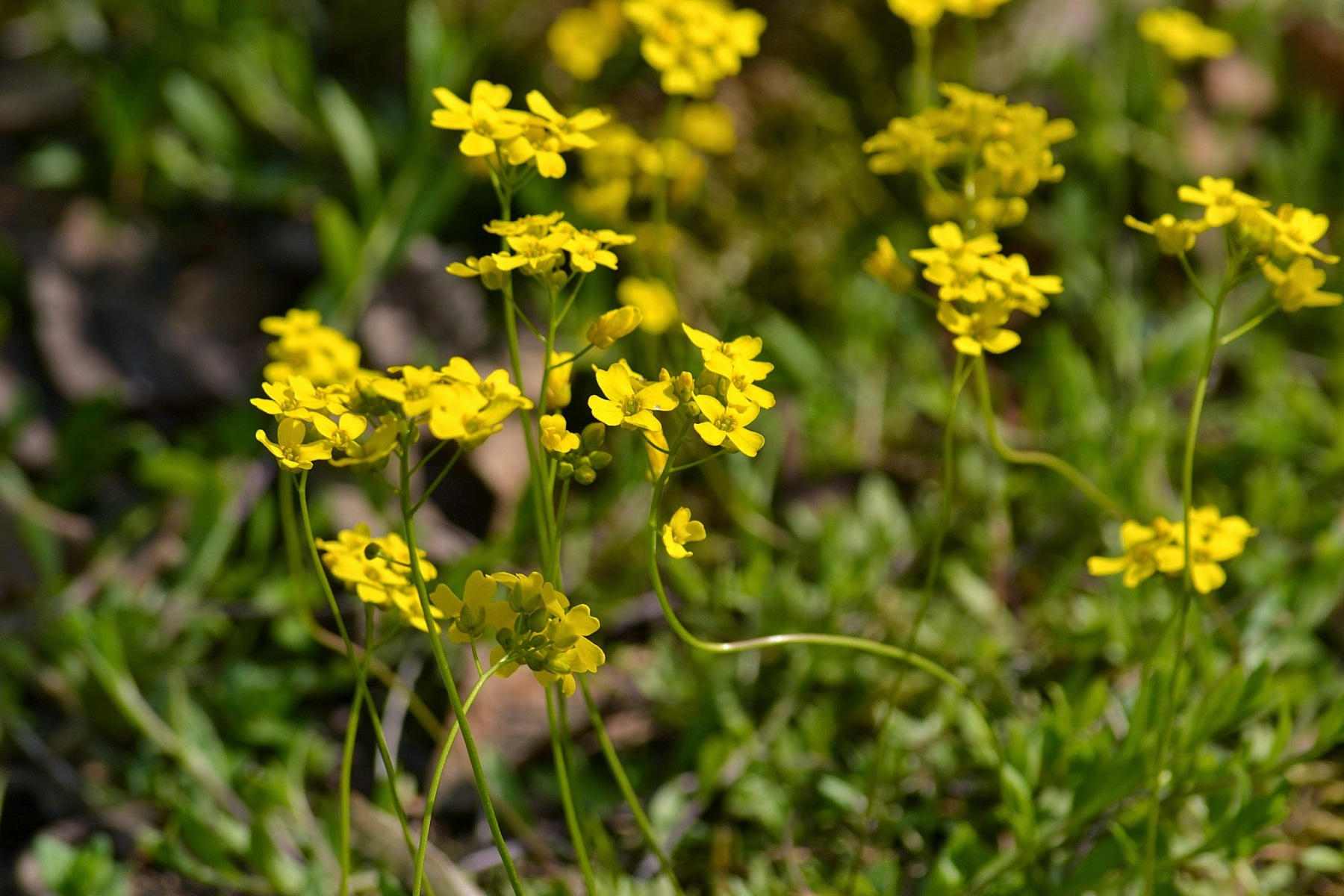

Conservation status
- Secure (NatureServe)

Scientific classification
- Kingdom: Plantae
- Clade: Tracheophytes
- Clade: Angiosperms
- Clade: Eudicots
- Clade: Rosids
- Order: Brassicales
- Family: Brassicaceae
- Genus: Draba
- Species: D. nemorosa

Binomial name
- Draba nemorosa L.

= Draba nemorosa =

Species of flowering plant

Draba nemorosa is a species of flowering plant belonging to the family Brassicaceae.

Its native range is Subarctic and Temperate Northern Hemisphere.
