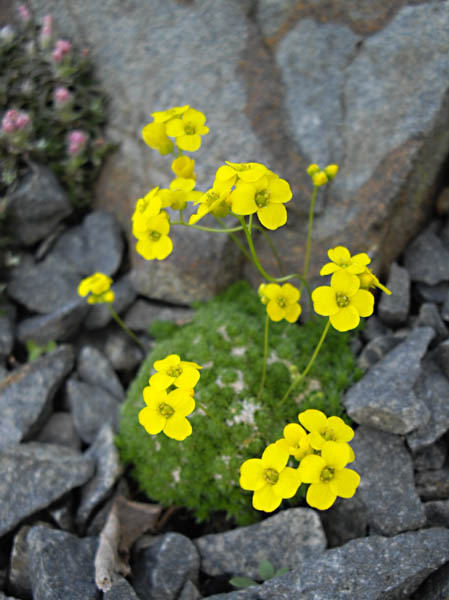

Scientific classification
- Kingdom: Plantae
- Clade: Tracheophytes
- Clade: Angiosperms
- Clade: Eudicots
- Clade: Rosids
- Order: Brassicales
- Family: Brassicaceae
- Genus: Draba
- Species: D. densifolia

Binomial name
- Draba densifolia Nutt.

Synonyms
- Draba caeruleomontana Draba nelsonii Draba sphaerula

= Draba densifolia =

Species of flowering plant

Draba densifolia is a species of flowering plant in the family Brassicaceae, called alpine whitlow-grass (a name it shares with Draba alpina) and denseleaf draba. This small perennial is native to western North America, where it is found in mountain environments above 2000 meters from California to Alaska to Wyoming. The plant forms cushion-like mats of small fleshy, hairy, pointed leaves in rocky crevices and on slopes. If it bolts a stem it is no taller than 15 centimeters. The flowers open in an obvious inflorescence of a few tiny blooms at times, but often appear as a layer on the surface of the mat of tiny leaves. The flowers are bright yellow with petals just a few millimeters wide. The fruit is a flat podlike silique less than a centimeter long. Grows in alpine rocky slopes, barren outcrops.
