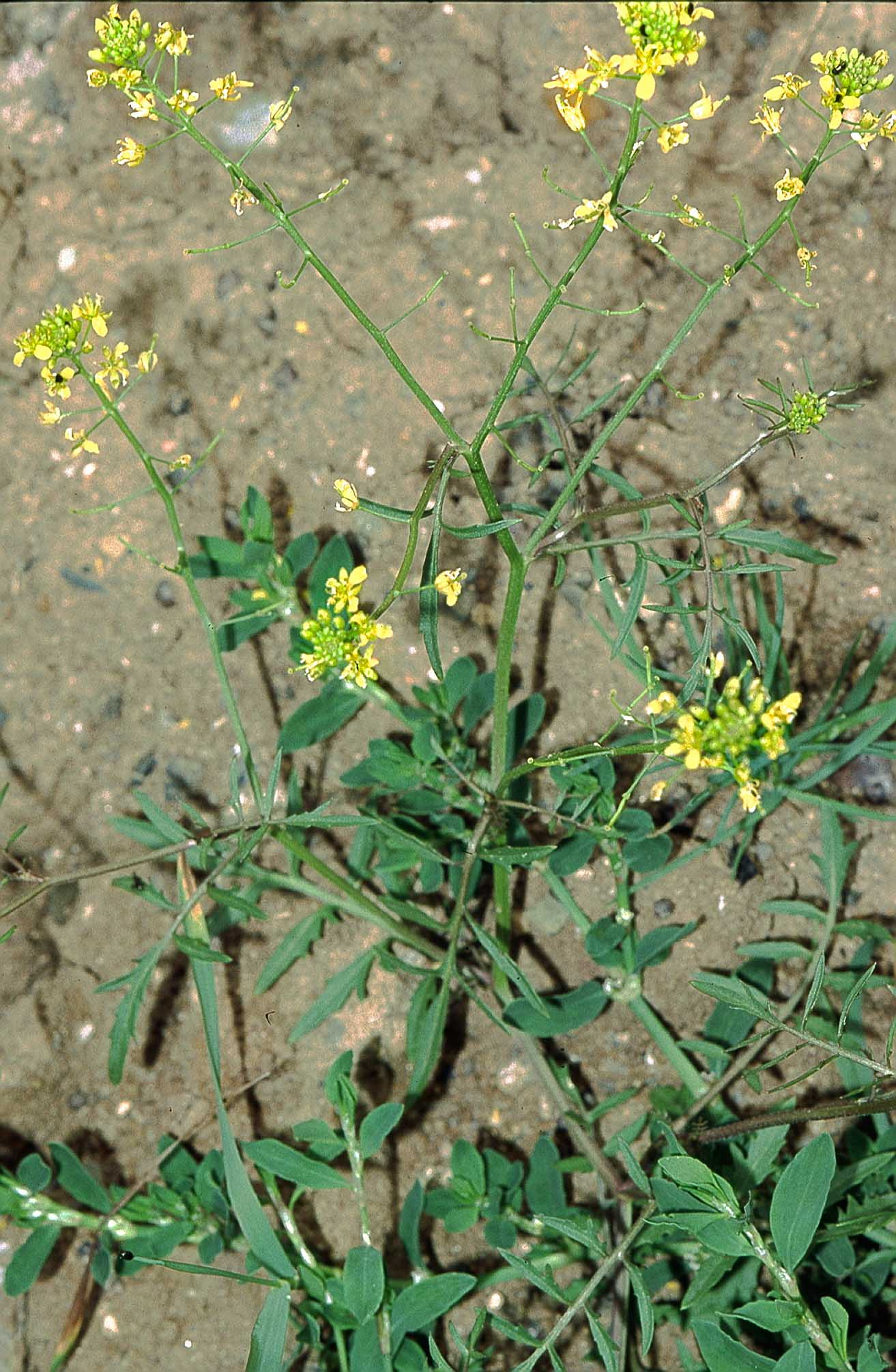

Scientific classification
- Kingdom: Plantae
- Clade: Embryophytes
- Clade: Tracheophytes
- Clade: Spermatophytes
- Clade: Angiosperms
- Clade: Eudicots
- Clade: Rosids
- Order: Brassicales
- Family: Brassicaceae
- Genus: Rorippa
- Species: R. sylvestris

Binomial name
- Rorippa sylvestris (L.) Besser, 1822]

= Rorippa sylvestris =

Species of flowering plant

Rorippa sylvestris (the creeping yellowcress, keek, or yellow fieldcress; syn. Radicula sylvestris (L.) Druce) is an invasive species of plant in the United States, likely entering from Europe before 1818 from ballast water and spreading throughout North America through contaminated nursery seed stock.
