= Rorippa curvisiliqua =

Scientific classification
- Kingdom: Plantae
- Clade: Tracheophytes
- Clade: Angiosperms
- Clade: Eudicots
- Clade: Rosids
- Order: Brassicales
- Family: Brassicaceae
- Genus: Rorippa
- Species: R. curvisiliqua

Binomial name
- Rorippa curvisiliqua (Hook.) Britton

Species of flowering plant

Rorippa curvisiliqua is a species of flowering plant in the family Brassicaceae known by the common name curvepod yellowcress.

It is native to western North America from Alaska to California to Wyoming. It is also native to the northwest part of Mexico. It can be found in various types of moist and wet habitat, including lakeshores and riverbanks, meadows, roadsides, and mudflats.

== Description ==
Rorippa curvisiliqua is an annual or biennial herb which can be quite variable in appearance. It produces prostrate to erect stems up to half a meter long. The leaves are up to 7 centimeters long and have blades which may be smooth-edged or divided into lobes of varying shapes.

The inflorescence is an elongated raceme occupying the top portion of the stem containing many tiny yellow flowers just a few millimeters long.

The fruit is a silique which is variable in size and shape but generally contains many minute seeds.

This species has been divided into a number of varieties, but some authorities doubt that this division is valid or useful.
