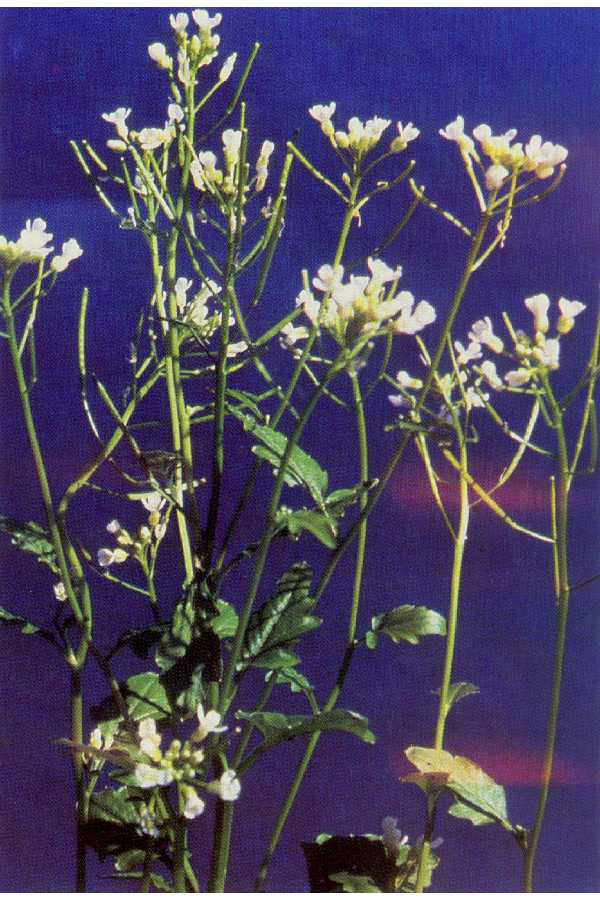

Conservation status
- Secure (NatureServe)

Scientific classification
- Kingdom: Plantae
- Clade: Tracheophytes
- Clade: Angiosperms
- Clade: Eudicots
- Clade: Rosids
- Order: Brassicales
- Family: Brassicaceae
- Genus: Cardamine
- Species: C. breweri

Binomial name
- Cardamine breweri S.Wats.

= Cardamine breweri =

Brewer's bittercress

Species of flowering plant

Cardamine breweri is a species of cardamine known by the common name Brewer's bittercress. It is native to western North America from British Columbia to California to Colorado, where it grows in coniferous forests, particularly in wet bog habitats.

== Description ==
Cardamine breweri is a perennial herb growing up to about half a meter in maximum height. The leaves are oval in shape and sometimes divided into a few smaller leaflets. The mustardlike inflorescence is a raceme of many white flowers, each with four petals half a centimeter long. The fruit is an erect silique up to 3 centimeters long containing many small seeds.
