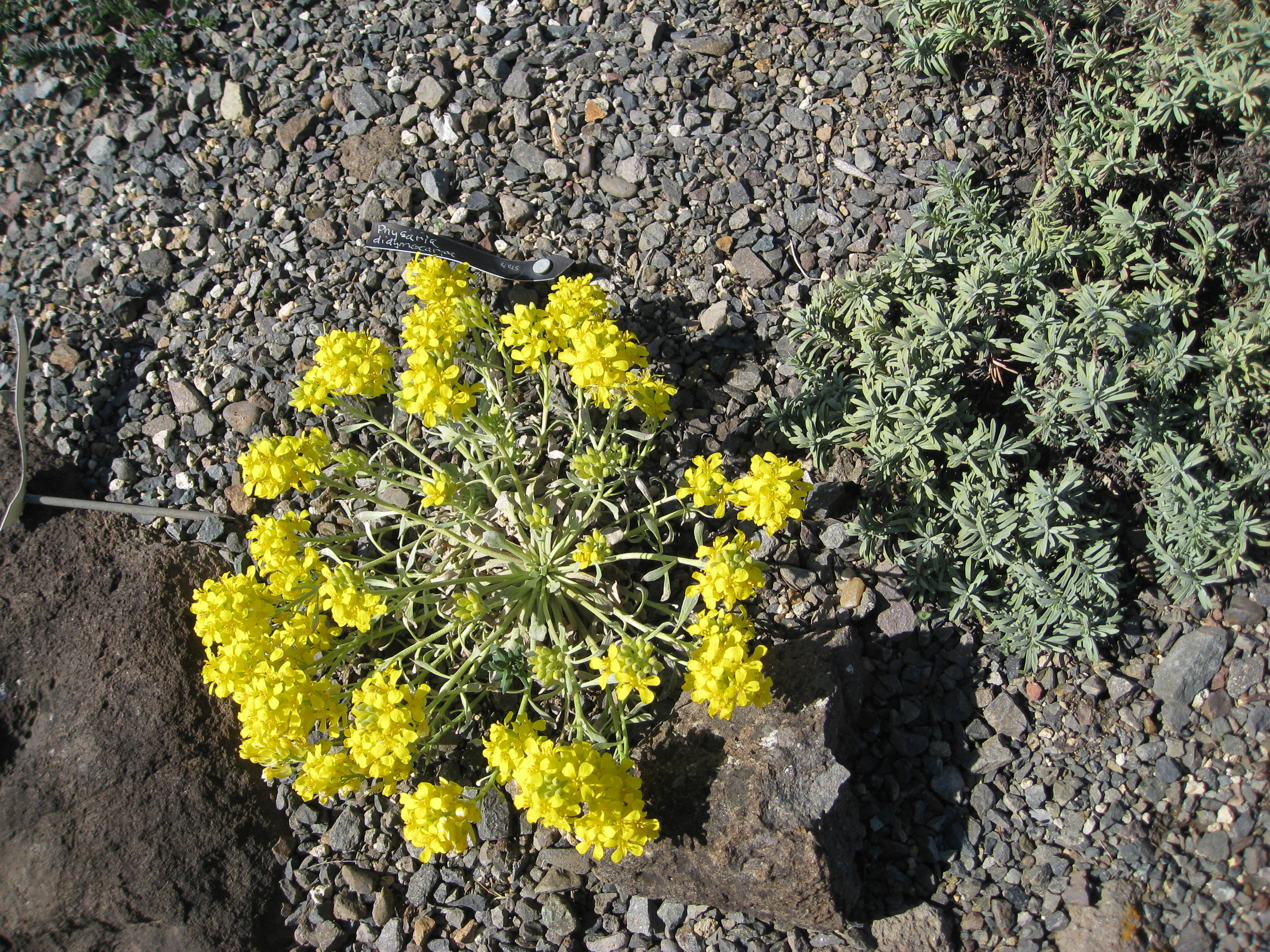

Conservation status
- Secure (NatureServe)

Scientific classification
- Kingdom: Plantae
- Clade: Tracheophytes
- Clade: Angiosperms
- Clade: Eudicots
- Clade: Rosids
- Order: Brassicales
- Family: Brassicaceae
- Genus: Physaria
- Species: P. didymocarpa

Binomial name
- Physaria didymocarpa (Hook.) A.Gray

= Physaria didymocarpa =

Species of flowering plant

Physaria didymocarpa is a species of flowering plant in the mustard family known by the common name common twinpod. It is native to western North America, including British Columbia and Alberta in Canada and the northwestern United States.

This perennial herb produces several decumbent stems from a hairy caudex. The stems are around 10 centimetres (3.9 in) in length and have lance-shaped leaves measuring one or two centimeters long. The ends of the stems have inflorescences which are dense racemes of yellow flowers. The petals are roughly one centimeter long. The fruit is an inflated silicle up to 2 centimetres (0.79 in) long by 2 centimetres (0.79 in) wide which is firm to papery and fuzzy in texture.

There are three subspecies of this plant. The ssp. lanata is native to Montana and Wyoming. The ssp. lyrata, a taxon characterized by its very inflated, papery fruits, is endemic to Idaho.
