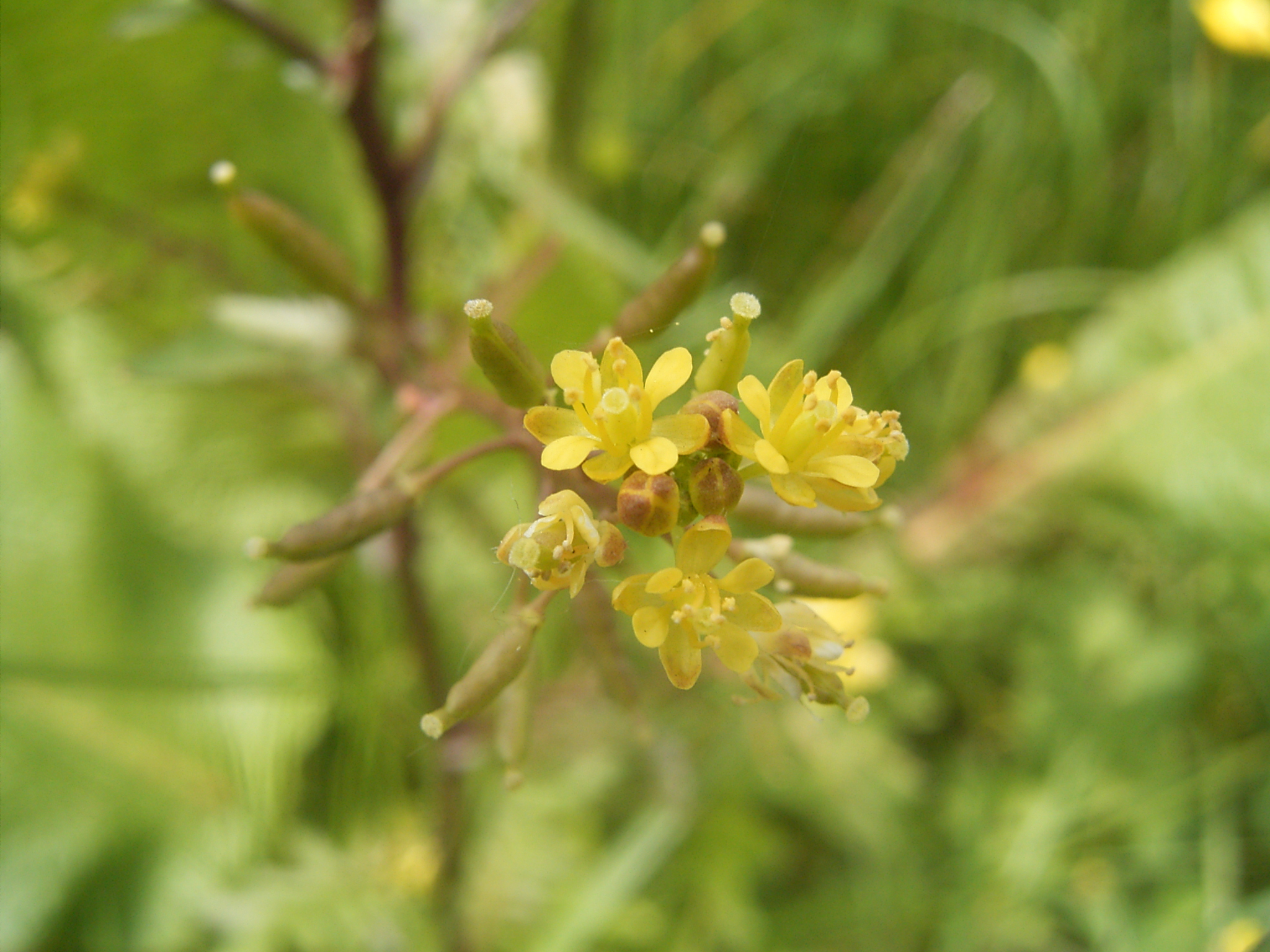

Conservation status
- Secure (NatureServe)

Scientific classification
- Kingdom: Plantae
- Clade: Tracheophytes
- Clade: Angiosperms
- Clade: Eudicots
- Clade: Rosids
- Order: Brassicales
- Family: Brassicaceae
- Genus: Rorippa
- Species: R. palustris

Binomial name
- Rorippa palustris (L.) Besser

Synonyms
- Rorippa islandica auct.; Sisymbrium amphibium var. palustre L. (basionym)

= Rorippa palustris =

Species of plant

Rorippa palustris, marsh yellow-cress, bog yellow-cress or common yellow-cress, is a species of flowering plant in the family Brassicaceae. It is widespread and native to parts of Africa, and much of Asia, Europe and Eurasia, North America and the Caribbean. It can also be found in other parts of the world as an introduced species and a common weed, for example, in Australia and South America. It is an adaptable plant which grows in many types of damp, wet, and aquatic habitat. It may be an annual, biennial, or perennial plant, and is variable in appearance as well.

== Description ==
It produces an erect stem, sometimes with branches, attaining a maximum height of just over one meter. The leaves are up to 30 centimeters long and have toothed to deeply lobed edges. The inflorescence is a raceme of mustardlike flowers with spoon-shaped yellow petals each a few millimeters in length. The fruit is a dehiscent and smoothly valved silicle, up to a centimeter long, and containing anywhere from 20 to 90 minute seeds.

== Etymology ==
The species epithet palustris is Latin for "of the marsh" and indicates its common habitat.

== Common names ==
In botanical literature, Rorippa palustris has been called by numerous common names (with variations). Some of them are listed here:

- bog marshcress
- bog yellowcress
- common yellowcress
- marsh yellowcress (or marsh yellow-cress)
- marshcress (or marsh cress)
- yellow cress
- yellow watercress (or yellow-watercress)

== Distribution ==
Rorippa palustris is native to, or naturalized across much of the globe.

=== Native range ===
- AFRICA: in Egypt and Ethiopia.
- ASIA and EURASIA: in Afghanistan; Bhutan; the Caucasus (in Armenia, Azerbaijan, Georgia, and Russia) and Ciscaucasia (in Dagestan); much of China and Taiwan; India (in the states of Assam, Bihar, Himachal Pradesh, Jammu and Kashmir, and West Bengal); Indonesia (in Papua province, Java, the Lesser Sunda, and Maluku Islands); Japan (in the prefectures of Hokkaido, Honshu, Kyushu, Shikoku, and the Ryukyu Islands); Kazakhstan; the Korean Peninsula; Kyrgyzstan; Mongolia; Pakistan; Papua New Guinea; eastern and western Siberia; Tajikistan; northeastern Turkey; Turkmenistan; Uzbekistan; and Yemen.
- EUROPE: grows natively in most regions.
- NORTH AMERICA: in every province and territory (excluding Nunavut) of Canada; Puerto Rico; the District of Columbia and every state (excluding Hawaii) in the United States; Mexico
- The CARIBBEAN: in Cuba and Haiti.
- AUSTRALASIA: New Zealand

=== Naturalized range ===
- AUSTRALASIA: Australia and New Zealand
- MEZO- and SOUTH AMERICA: in Argentina; Brazil; Chile; Ecuador; Panama; Peru; and Suriname.
