= A. spectabilis =

A. spectabilis may refer to:

- Abies spectabilis, a conifer species
- Acacia spectabilis, a shrub species
- Acanthocinus spectabilis, a longhorn beetle species
- Acantopsis spectabilis, a fish species
- Aechmea spectabilis, a flowering plant species
- Aglaia spectabilis, a tree species
- Amsinckia spectabilis, a flowering plant species
- Anthophrys spectabilis, a moth species
- Apalochlamys spectabilis, a flowering plant species
- Aspilapteryx spectabilis, a moth species

== Synonyms ==
- Agrotis spectabilis, a synonym of Tiracola plagiata, a moth species
