= Amsinckia carinata =

Conservation status
- Imperiled (NatureServe)

Scientific classification
- Kingdom: Plantae
- Clade: Tracheophytes
- Clade: Angiosperms
- Clade: Eudicots
- Clade: Asterids
- Order: Boraginales
- Family: Boraginaceae
- Genus: Amsinckia
- Species: A. carinata

Binomial name
- Amsinckia carinata A.Nelson & J.F.Macbr. 1916

Species of flowering plant

Amsinckia carinata is a species of flowering plant in the borage family known by the common name Malheur Valley fiddleneck. It is endemic to Oregon, where it is known only from Malheur County.

Amsinckia carinata is an annual herb growing 10 to 30 centimetres (3.9 to 11.8 in) tall. It is coated in bristly hairs. The lance-shaped or narrowly oval leaves are up to 8 centimetres (3.1 in) long and are covered in hairs with pustule-like bases. The inflorescence is a coiled cyme of dark yellow to orange flowers each about a centimeter long. The fruit is a shiny, dark gray nutlet.

Amsinckia carinata was believed to be extinct until 1984, when it was rediscovered. It occurs in the Malheur River Valley in eastern Oregon, where it grows on slopes of talus and gravel. It grows alongside the more common Amsinckia tessellata, which replaces it at lower elevations and in less pristine habitat. There are six populations, in less than 12 square miles (30.7 km^{2}) of territory.

In the 1990s, some authors came to regard A. carinata as a synonym of A. vernicosa, which is not as rare. The consensus now is to consider it a distinct species, but the merge made it less likely that the populations would receive attention as a rare taxon. It grows only on federal land. Mining activity threatens some of the populations. Also, the landscape has been taken over by introduced species of plants, such as Bromus tectorum, cheatgrass, a change which has been intensified by cattle grazing in the area.
