= Ethmia albitogata =

Scientific classification
- Kingdom: Animalia
- Phylum: Arthropoda
- Clade: Pancrustacea
- Class: Insecta
- Order: Lepidoptera
- Family: Depressariidae
- Genus: Ethmia
- Species: E. albitogata

Binomial name
- Ethmia albitogata Walsingham, 1907

Species of moth

Ethmia albitogata is a moth in the family Depressariidae. It is found in central California.

The length of the forewings is 6–7.1 millimetres (0.24–0.28 in). The ground color of the forewings is dark gray heavily overscaled with white. The ground color of the hindwings (including fringe) is white, but the apical area and base of the adjoining fringe are blackish. Adults are on wing in February and March.

The larvae feed on Amsinckia lunaris and possibly other Amsinckia species.
