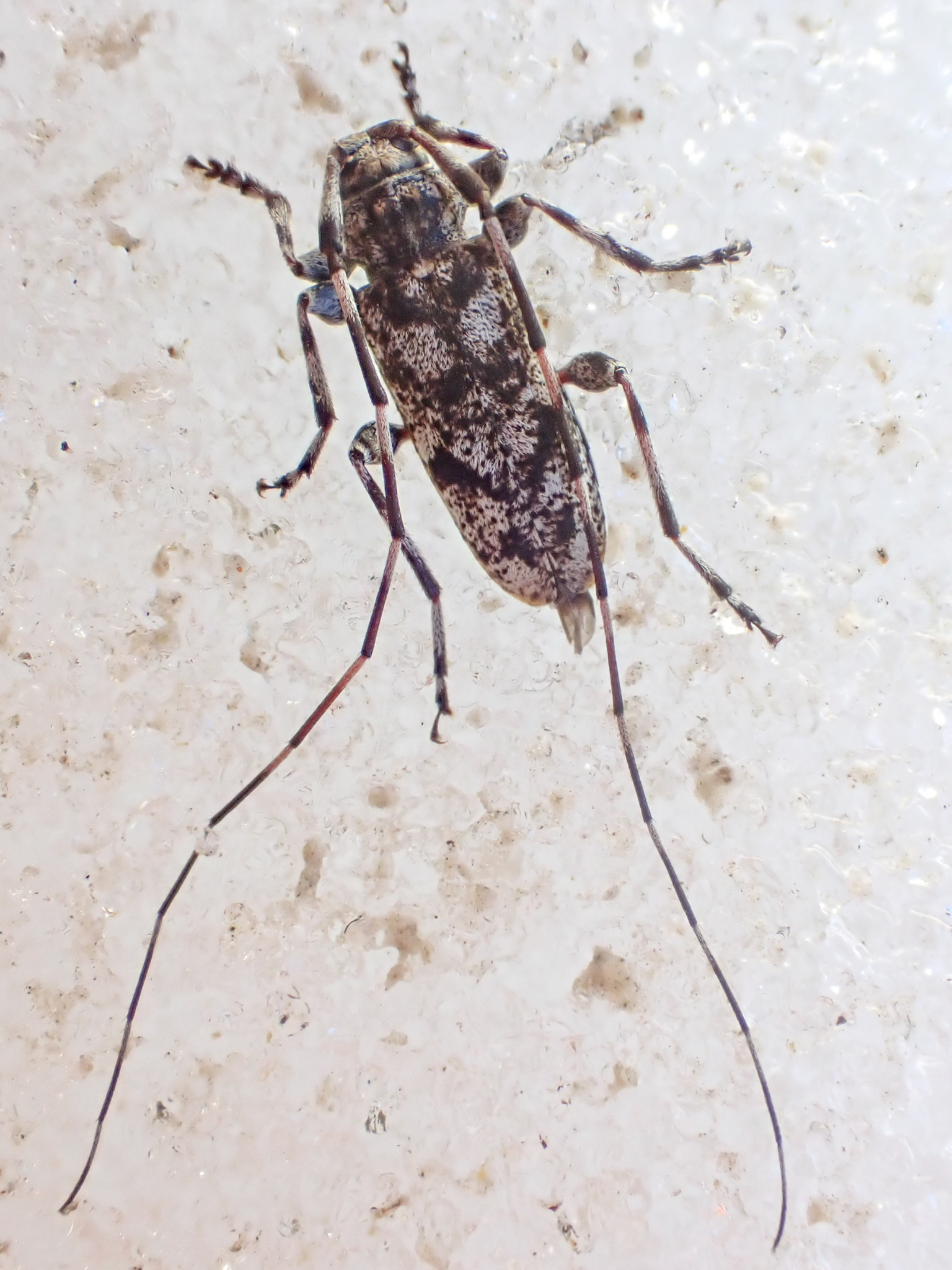

Scientific classification
- Domain: Eukaryota
- Kingdom: Animalia
- Phylum: Arthropoda
- Class: Insecta
- Order: Coleoptera
- Suborder: Polyphaga
- Infraorder: Cucujiformia
- Family: Cerambycidae
- Genus: Acanthocinus
- Species: A. pusillus

Binomial name
- Acanthocinus pusillus Kirby in Richardson, 1837

= Acanthocinus pusillus =

Species of beetle

Acanthocinus pusillus is a species of longhorn beetles of the subfamily Lamiinae. It was described by William Kirby in 1837.

Zuletzt gesichtet am 29.06.2024 um 00:05 in Straubenhardt/Schwann Baden-Württemberg
