= Acanthocinus angulosus =

Scientific classification
- Kingdom: Animalia
- Phylum: Arthropoda
- Class: Insecta
- Order: Coleoptera
- Suborder: Polyphaga
- Infraorder: Cucujiformia
- Family: Cerambycidae
- Genus: Acanthocinus
- Species: A. angulosus

Binomial name
- Acanthocinus angulosus (Casey, 1913)

Species of beetle

Acanthocinus angulosus is a species of longhorn beetles of the subfamily Lamiinae. It was described by Casey in 1913, and is known from North America.
