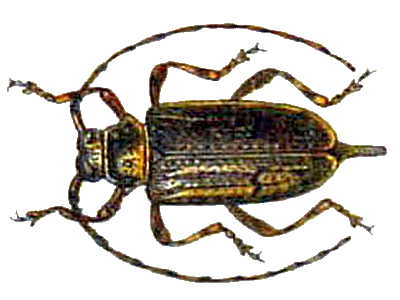

Scientific classification
- Kingdom: Animalia
- Phylum: Arthropoda
- Clade: Pancrustacea
- Class: Insecta
- Order: Coleoptera
- Suborder: Polyphaga
- Infraorder: Cucujiformia
- Family: Cerambycidae
- Genus: Acanthocinus
- Species: A. reticulatus

Binomial name
- Acanthocinus reticulatus (Razumovsky, 1789)

= Acanthocinus reticulatus =

Species of beetle

Acanthocinus reticulatus is a species of longhorn beetles of the subfamily Lamiinae. It was described by Razoumowsky in 1789, and is known from southern Europe and Russia. The beetles measure 10–15 millimetres in length, and can live for approximately 1–2 years. They typically inhabit fir trees, but are also known to occasionally live in other conifers.
