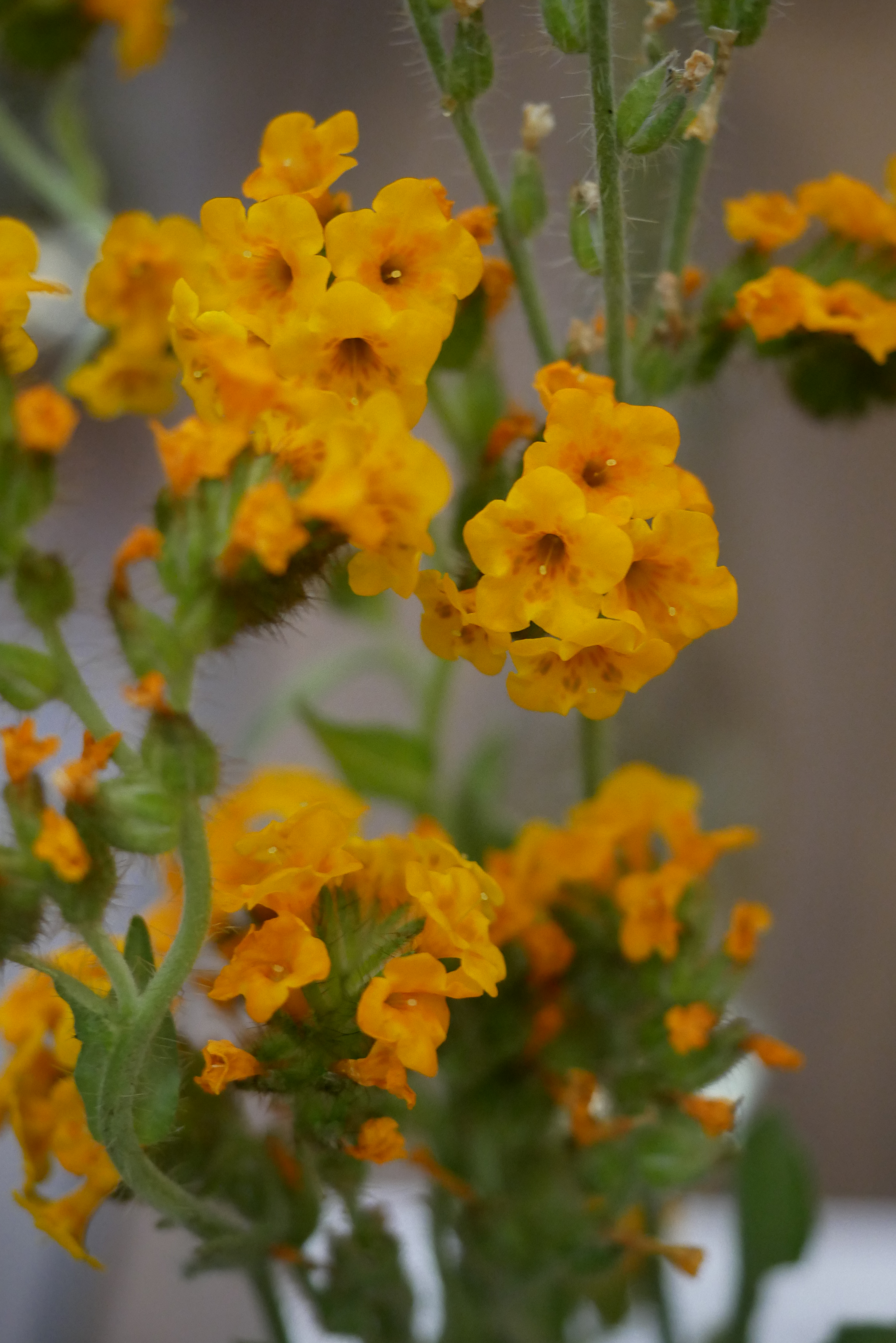

Conservation status
- Vulnerable (NatureServe)

Scientific classification
- Kingdom: Plantae
- Clade: Tracheophytes
- Clade: Angiosperms
- Clade: Eudicots
- Clade: Asterids
- Order: Boraginales
- Family: Boraginaceae
- Genus: Amsinckia
- Species: A. douglasiana

Binomial name
- Amsinckia douglasiana A.DC.

= Amsinckia douglasiana =

Species of fiddleneck

Amsinckia douglasiana is an uncommon species of flowering plant in the family Boraginaceae, known by the common name Douglas' fiddleneck. It is endemic to the coastal Santa Monica Mountains and Santa Ynez Mountains of southern California.

== Description ==
Amsinckia douglasiana is a bristly annual herb producing coiled, fiddlehead-shaped inflorescences of yellow-orange flowers similar to other fiddlenecks. The flowers are over a centimeter wide and often have fewer than five lobes. This species is heterostylous.

It is also known as an occasional introduced species on the East Coast of the U.S.

== Gallery ==
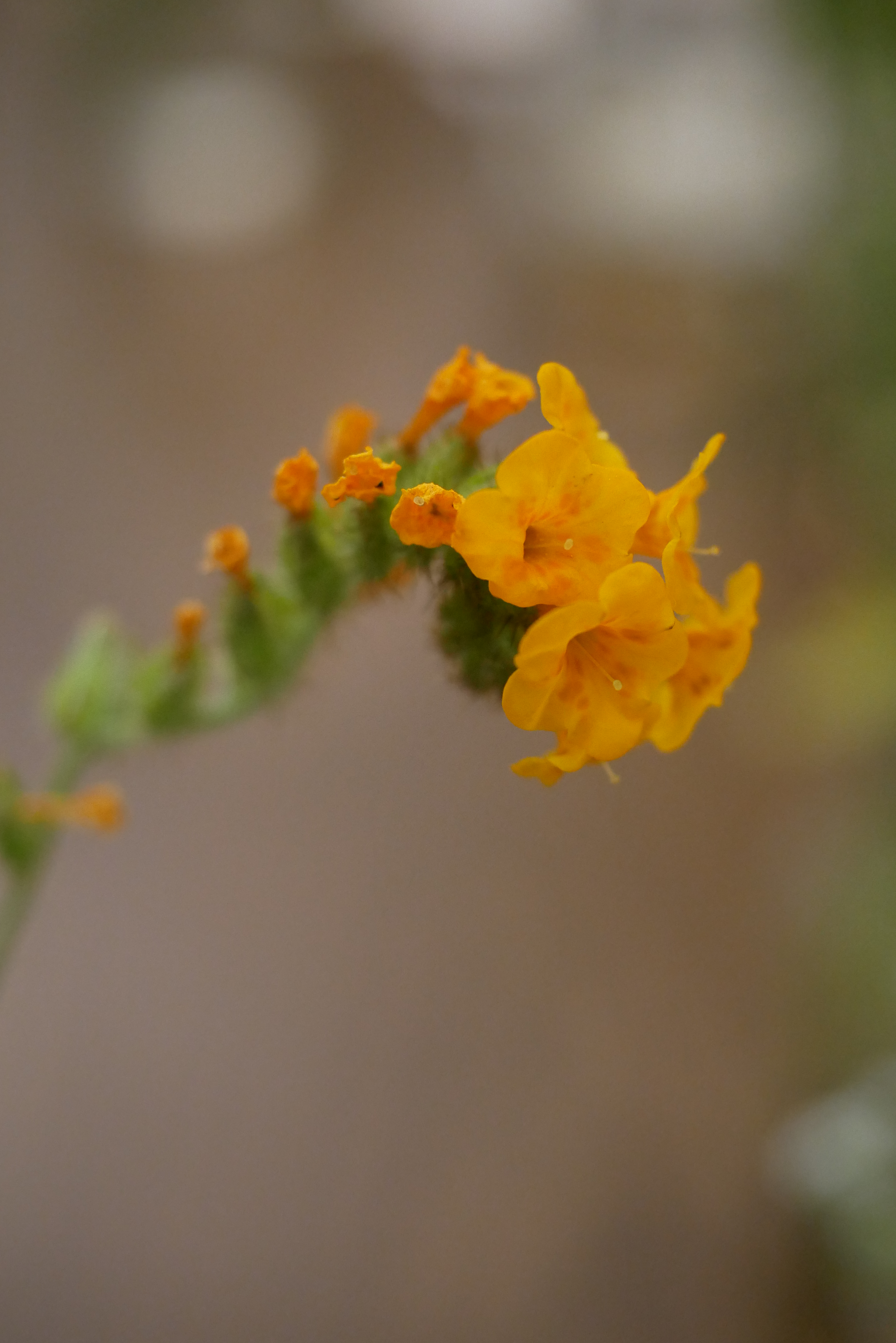
