= Tiracola grandirena =

Scientific classification
- Domain: Eukaryota
- Kingdom: Animalia
- Phylum: Arthropoda
- Class: Insecta
- Order: Lepidoptera
- Superfamily: Noctuoidea
- Family: Noctuidae
- Genus: Tiracola
- Species: T. grandirena

Binomial name
- Tiracola grandirena (Herrich-Schäffer, 1868)

Synonyms
- Agrotis grandirena Herrich-Schäffer, 1868; Tiracola plagiata f. magniplaga Draudt, 1924; Tiracola plagiata f. mediosuffusa Draudt, 1924; Tiracola grandirena sacca Todd & Poole, 1980

Species of moth

Tiracola grandirena is a moth of the family Noctuidae first described by Gottlieb August Wilhelm Herrich-Schäffer in 1868. It is found from Mexico to Venezuela, as well as on Cuba, Jamaica and Puerto Rico.
