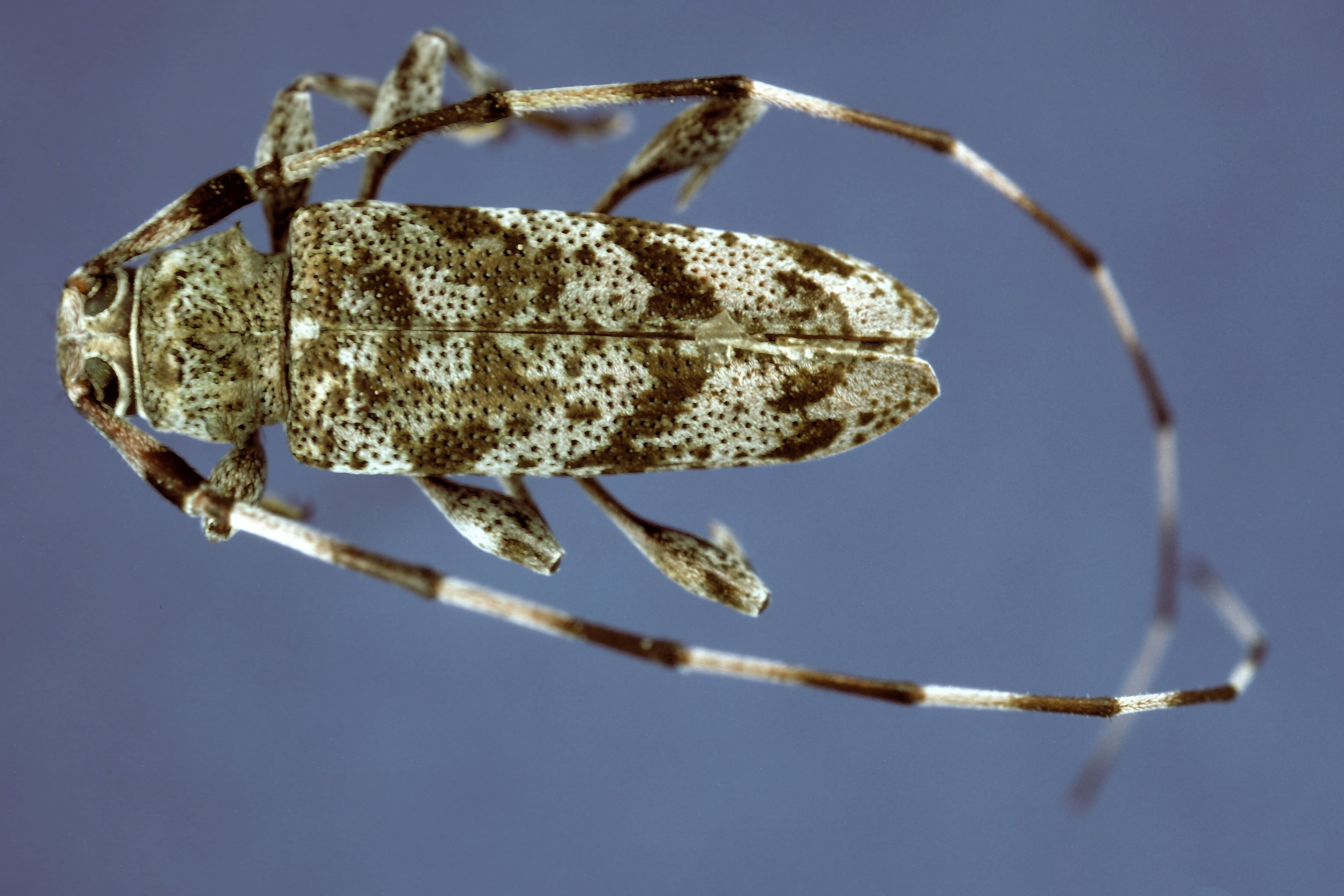

Scientific classification
- Kingdom: Animalia
- Phylum: Arthropoda
- Clade: Pancrustacea
- Class: Insecta
- Order: Coleoptera
- Suborder: Polyphaga
- Infraorder: Cucujiformia
- Family: Cerambycidae
- Genus: Acanthocinus
- Species: A. obsoletus

Binomial name
- Acanthocinus obsoletus (Olivier, 1795)

= Acanthocinus obsoletus =

Species of beetle

Acanthocinus obsoletus is a species of longhorn beetles of the subfamily Lamiinae. It was described by Guillaume-Antoine Olivier in 1795. It can be found in eastern North America, Cuba, and the Bahamas.
