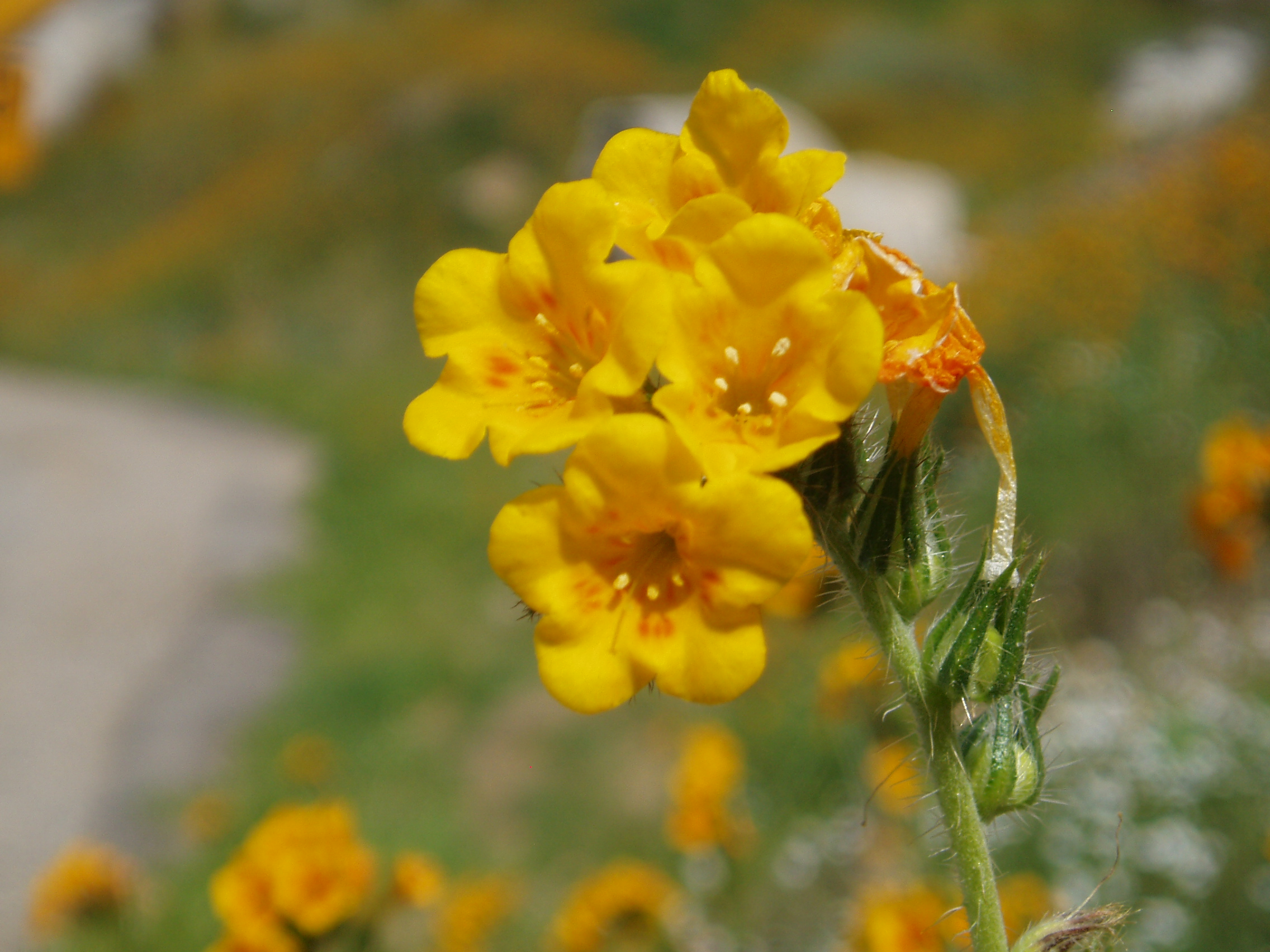

Conservation status
- Apparently Secure (NatureServe)

Scientific classification
- Kingdom: Plantae
- Clade: Tracheophytes
- Clade: Angiosperms
- Clade: Eudicots
- Clade: Asterids
- Order: Boraginales
- Family: Boraginaceae
- Genus: Amsinckia
- Species: A. eastwoodiae

Binomial name
- Amsinckia eastwoodiae J.F.Macbr.

= Amsinckia eastwoodiae =

Species of flowering plant

Amsinckia eastwoodiae is a species of fiddleneck known by the common name Eastwood's fiddleneck. It is endemic to California, where it grows in the varied plant habitat of the hills, mountains, valleys, and coastlines.

Amsinckia eastwoodiae is a bristly annual herb similar in appearance to the other fiddlenecks. Its coiled inflorescence has tubular orange flowers up to 2 centimeters long and 1.5 wide at the face.
