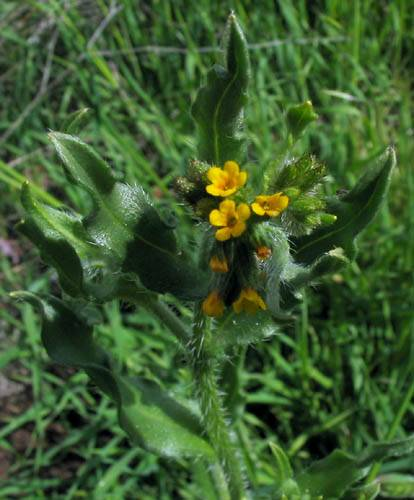

Conservation status
- Secure (NatureServe)

Scientific classification
- Kingdom: Plantae
- Clade: Tracheophytes
- Clade: Angiosperms
- Clade: Eudicots
- Clade: Asterids
- Order: Boraginales
- Family: Boraginaceae
- Genus: Amsinckia
- Species: A. menziesii

Binomial name
- Amsinckia menziesii (Lehm.) A.Nelson & J.F.Macbr.

Synonyms
- Benthamia menziesii (Lehm.) Druce; Echium menziesii Lehm.

= Amsinckia menziesii =

Species of flowering plant

Amsinckia menziesii, commonly known as fiddleneck or rancher's fireweed, is a species of flowering plant in the family Boraginaceae, the borage or forget-me-not family.

== Description ==
The plant grows to 90 centimetres (35 in) in height, with stems covered by bristly hairs. The leaves are up to 15 cm (6 in) long and narrowly to broadly lanceolate.

From April to May, coils of yellow-orange flowers bloom at the ends of the branches (their resemblance to the end of a fiddle lending the common name "fiddleneck"). The calyx has five narrow lobes and the corolla is 3–10 millimetres (1/8–3/8 in) wide. The joined petals form a narrow funnel which flares out at the end. The fruit is grayish and divided into four nutlets about 3 mm (1/8 in) long.

== Varieties ==
The plant has two varieties:

Amsinckia menziesii var. intermedia - common fiddleneck, intermediate fiddleneck
Amsinckia menziesii var. menziesii - Menzies' fiddleneck

=== Var. intermedia ===
Amsinckia menziesii var. intermedia (common fiddleneck, or intermediate fiddleneck) is one of the common fiddlenecks of western North America, distributed from Alaska and Canada through the Western United States to Mexico. The flowers are yellow-orange, orange, or dark yellow.

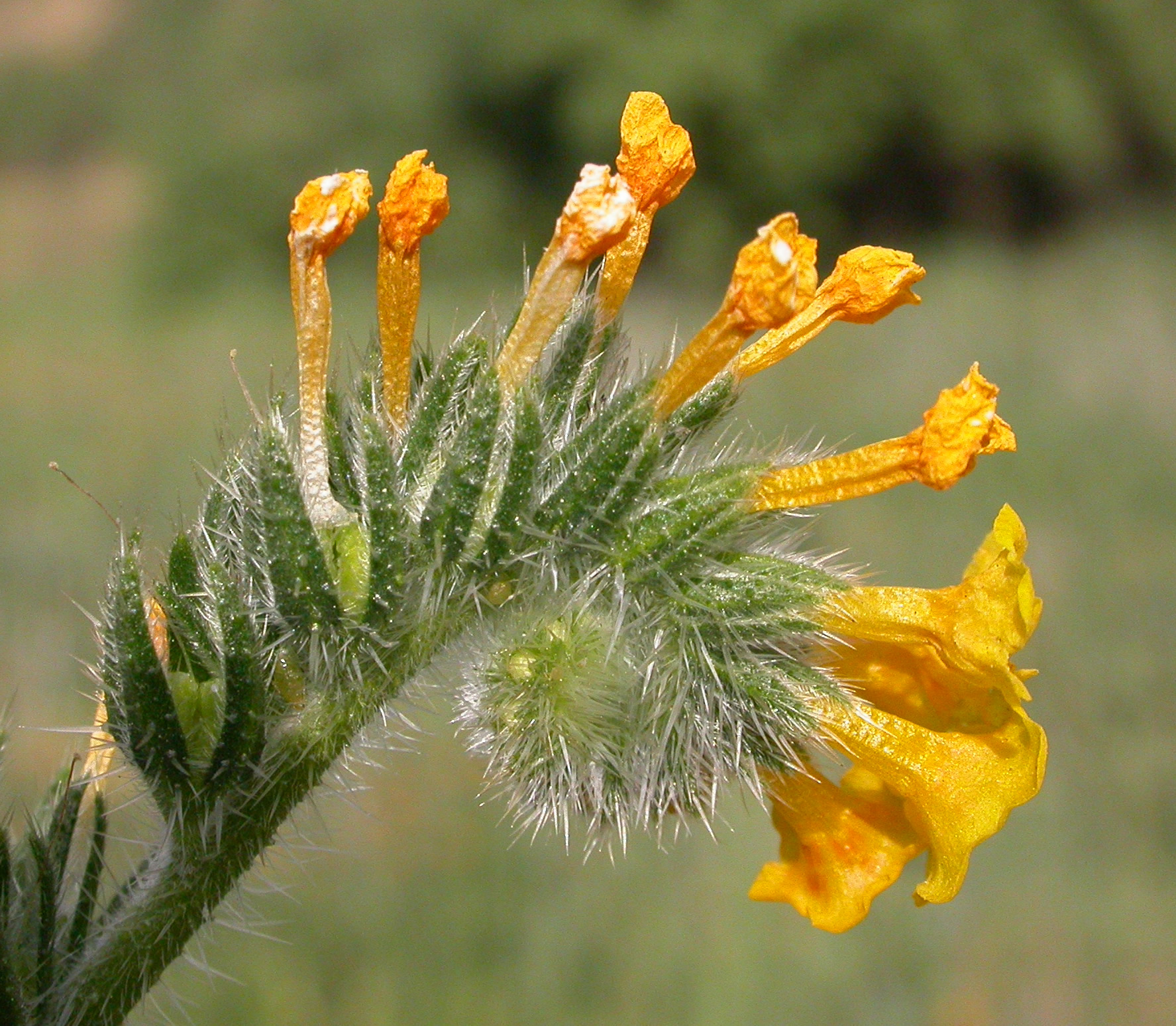
A. menziesii var. intermedia

== Distribution and habitat ==
The plant can be found in open areas from Washington and Idaho east to Arizona and south to Baja California.

== Ecology ==
In Australia, the species has become a common weed of cultivated areas in New South Wales, Victoria and Queensland. In the British Isles, it is an introduced species naturalised particularly in the east of the country and recorded in the wild since 1910.

Its seeds, while inedible to humans due to their high pyrrolizidine alkaloid content, are the favorite food of Lawrence's goldfinch during that Californian bird's nesting season of spring and early summer.
