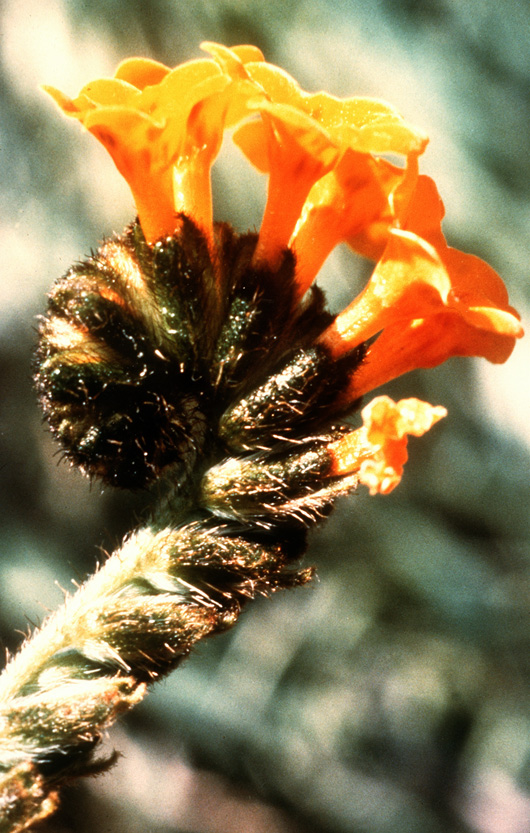

Conservation status
- Critically Imperiled (NatureServe)

- Endangered (ESA)

Scientific classification
- Kingdom: Plantae
- Clade: Tracheophytes
- Clade: Angiosperms
- Clade: Eudicots
- Clade: Asterids
- Order: Boraginales
- Family: Boraginaceae
- Genus: Amsinckia
- Species: A. grandiflora

Binomial name
- Amsinckia grandiflora (Kleeb. ex A.Gray) Kleeb. ex Greene

= Amsinckia grandiflora =

Species of flowering plant

Amsinckia grandiflora is a species of fiddleneck known by the common name large-flowered fiddleneck. This is a wildflower endemic to California and considered an endangered species on the state and national level. Amsinckia grandiflora is one of four 1248 rare heterostylous species within the genus Amsinckia that have highly restricted distributions from which the more weedy homostylous congeners are thought to have evolved.

== Distribution ==
The last remaining native populations are on the grasslands near Lawrence Livermore National Laboratory in Alameda County, California. Other populations have been established in nearby protected areas. The plant is endangered due to a number of factors, including invasive plants, grazing, and development of the valuable land. In the California grasslands, fire is commonly used to control the exotic species, however it negatively affects the native species that live there like Amsinckia grandiflora. Due to the use of fire, the population of the organism is decreasing.

This fiddleneck has low reproductive output; it produces few seeds per plant. It is also heterostylous, making the plant self-incompatible, which means individuals cannot breed with other individuals of the same morph. This often prevents reproduction. Also, processes like recombination can produce extremely unfit individuals, and inbreeding depression is a risk for both self-compatible and self-incompatible plants. These rare plants are less likely to have preferential pollinators and hence are more vulnerable to stigmatic clogging from extraspecific pollen and interspecific disease transmission through the pollination vector.

This fiddleneck is also sensitive to habitat; it grows on sedimentary loam in mesic areas of its range. The Livermore Laboratory is actively monitoring the status of this California endemic.
