= Amsinckia lunaris =

Conservation status
- Vulnerable (NatureServe)

Scientific classification
- Kingdom: Plantae
- Clade: Tracheophytes
- Clade: Angiosperms
- Clade: Eudicots
- Clade: Asterids
- Order: Boraginales
- Family: Boraginaceae
- Genus: Amsinckia
- Species: A. lunaris

Binomial name
- Amsinckia lunaris J.F.Macbr.

Species of flowering plant

Amsinckia lunaris is an uncommon species of fiddleneck known by the common name bent-flowered fiddleneck. It is endemic to California, where it grows in the San Francisco Bay Area, the woods of the coastal and inland mountains just north, and the Central Valley and its San Joaquin Valley.

== Description ==
Amsinckia lunaris is a bristly annual herb with coiled inflorescences of tubular orange flowers similar to those of other fiddlenecks, except for the characteristic bend in the flower tube. The flowers are about a centimeter long and less in width at the face.

== See also ==
- Ethmia albitogata — endemic moth, feeds on Amsinckia lunaris.
