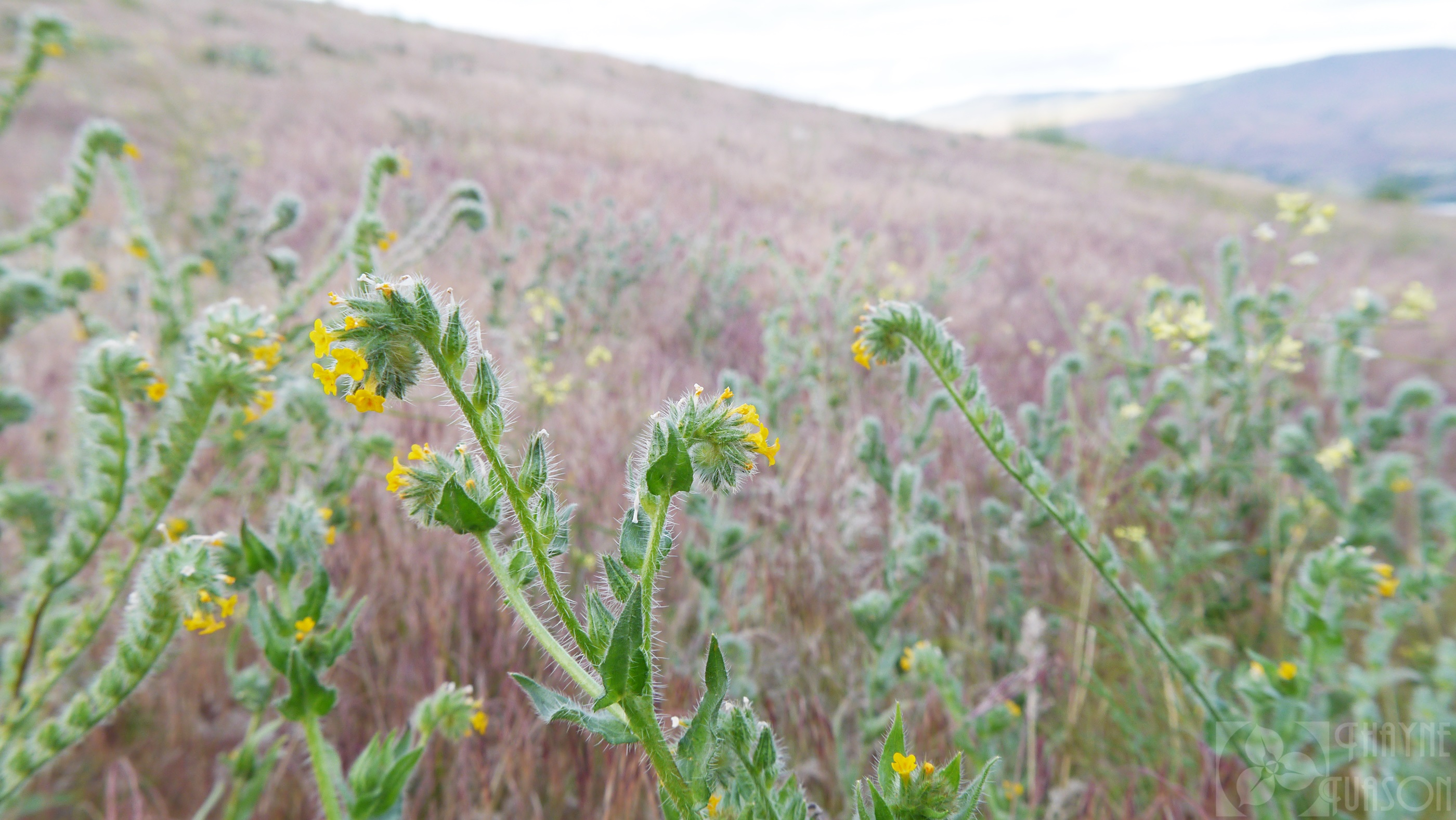

Conservation status
- Apparently Secure (NatureServe)

Scientific classification
- Kingdom: Plantae
- Clade: Tracheophytes
- Clade: Angiosperms
- Clade: Eudicots
- Clade: Asterids
- Order: Boraginales
- Family: Boraginaceae
- Genus: Amsinckia
- Species: A. lycopsoides

Binomial name
- Amsinckia lycopsoides Lehm.

Synonyms
- List: Benthamia lycopsoides (Lindl. ex Lehm.) Druce; Amsinckia arenaria Suksd.; Amsinckia barbata Greene; Amsinckia campestris Greene; Amsinckia douglasiana var. campestris (Greene) Jeps.; Amsinckia douglasiana var. intactilis (J.F.Macbr.) Faegri; Amsinckia glomerata Suksd.; Amsinckia idahoensis M.E.Jones; Amsinckia intactilis J.F.Macbr.; Amsinckia setosissima Suksd.; Amsinckia straminea Suksd.; Benthamia arenaria (Suksd.) Druce; Benthamia barbata (Greene) Druce; Benthamia campestris (Greene) Druce; Benthamia idahoensis (M.E.Jones) Druce

= Amsinckia lycopsoides =

Species of flowering plant

Amsinckia lycopsoides is a species of flowering plant, known by the common name tarweed fiddleneck or bugloss fiddleneck, in the family Boraginaceae. It is one of the more common species of fiddleneck. It is native to much of western North America from California to British Columbia. It can be found in a wide variety of areas.

== Description ==
Amsinckia lycopsoides is a bristly annual herb similar in appearance to other fiddlenecks. Its coiled inflorescence contains yellow flowers about a centimeter long and nearly the same in width, with a five-lobed corolla closed at the mouth by the bulges in the lobes. Flowers bloom April to July.

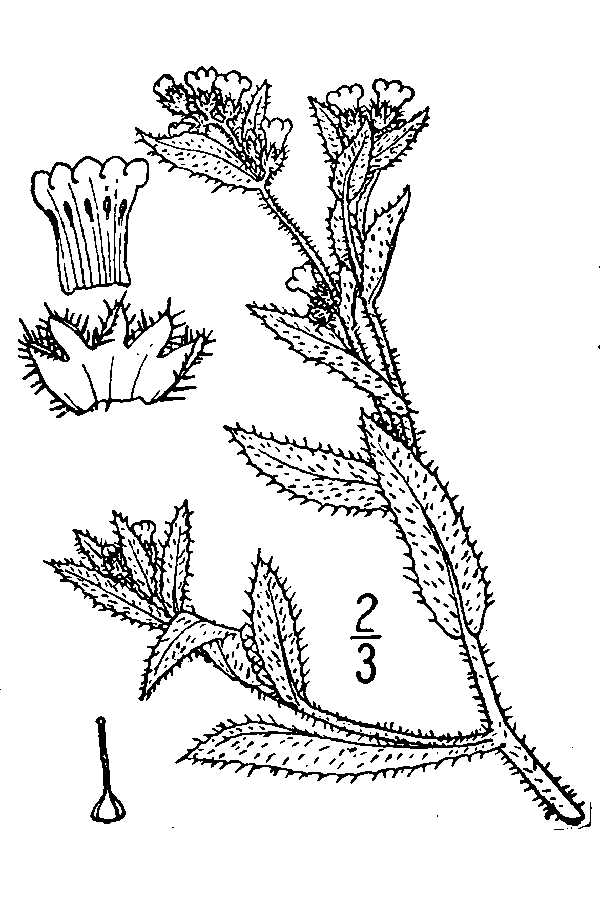
Illustration of Amsinckia lycopsoides

== Introduced species ==
It is an introduced species far beyond the Pacific region, to Alaska, Texas, and New England. In Australia, the species has become a widespread weed of pasture lands.
