= Acanthocinus leechi =

Scientific classification
- Domain: Eukaryota
- Kingdom: Animalia
- Phylum: Arthropoda
- Class: Insecta
- Order: Coleoptera
- Suborder: Polyphaga
- Infraorder: Cucujiformia
- Family: Cerambycidae
- Genus: Acanthocinus
- Species: A. leechi

Binomial name
- Acanthocinus leechi (Dillon, 1956)

Species of beetle

Acanthocinus leechi is a species of longhorn beetles of the subfamily Lamiinae. It was described by Lawrence S. Dillon in 1956.
