= Acanthocinus =

- Acanthocinus reticulatus

Scientific classification
- Kingdom: Animalia
- Phylum: Arthropoda
- Class: Insecta
- Order: Coleoptera
- Suborder: Polyphaga
- Infraorder: Cucujiformia
- Family: Cerambycidae
- Tribe: Acanthocinini
- Genus: Acanthocinus; Megerle in Dejean, 1821

Genus of beetles

Acanthocinus is a genus of longhorn beetles of the subfamily Lamiinae. It was described by Megerle in 1821.

== Species ==
- Acanthocinus aedilis (Linnaeus, 1758)
- Acanthocinus angulosus (Casey, 1913)
- Acanthocinus elegans Ganglbauer, 1884
- Acanthocinus griseus (Fabricius, 1792)
- Acanthocinus henschi Reitter, 1900
- Acanthocinus leechi (Dillon, 1956)
- Acanthocinus nodosus (Fabricius, 1775)
- Acanthocinus obliquus (LeConte, 1862)
- Acanthocinus obsoletus (Olivier, 1795)
- Ponderosa pine bark borer, Acanthocinus princeps (Walker in Lord, 1866)
- Acanthocinus pusillus Kirby in Richardson, 1837
- Acanthocinus reticulatus (Razoumowsky, 1789)
- Acanthocinus spectabilis (LeConte, 1854)
