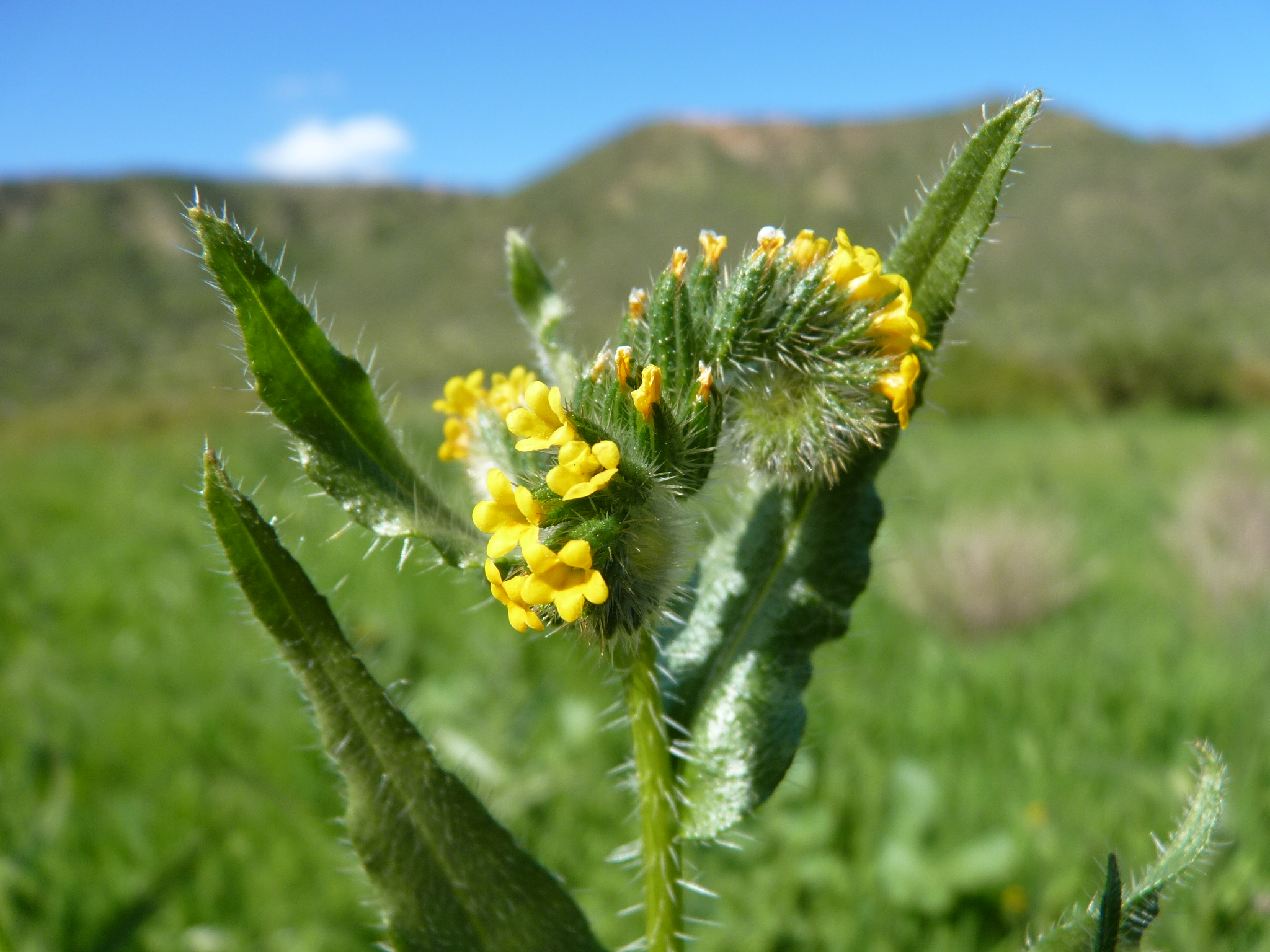

Scientific classification
- Kingdom: Plantae
- Clade: Tracheophytes
- Clade: Angiosperms
- Clade: Eudicots
- Clade: Asterids
- Order: Boraginales
- Family: Boraginaceae
- Genus: Amsinckia
- Species: A. calycina

Binomial name
- Amsinckia calycina (Moris) Chater

Synonyms
- Lithospermum calycinum Moris

= Amsinckia calycina =

Species of plant

Amsinckia calycina, also known as hairy fiddleneck or yellow burweed, is a species of flowering plant in the family Boraginaceae. It is native to Argentina and Chile and naturalised in Australia. It is an annual herb, growing to between 15 and 50 cm high and has pale yellow flowers. The species is poisonous to mammals.
