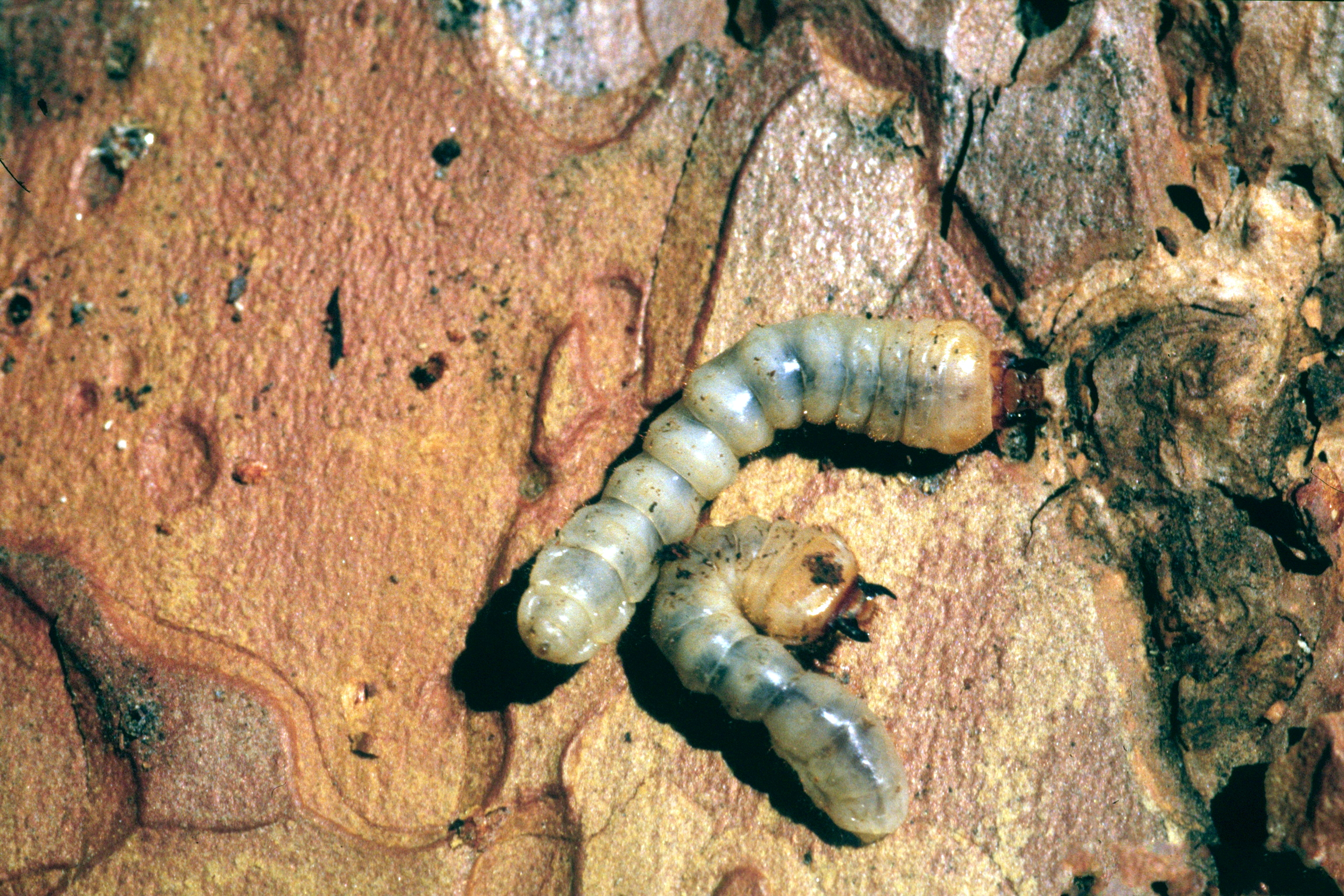

Scientific classification
- Kingdom: Animalia
- Phylum: Arthropoda
- Class: Insecta
- Order: Coleoptera
- Suborder: Polyphaga
- Infraorder: Cucujiformia
- Family: Cerambycidae
- Genus: Acanthocinus
- Species: A. princeps

Binomial name
- Acanthocinus princeps (Walker in Lord, 1866)

= Acanthocinus princeps =

Ponderosa pine bark borer

Species of beetle

Acanthocinus princeps, the ponderosa pine bark borer, is a species of longhorn beetle of the subfamily Lamiinae. It was described by Francis Walker in 1866.
