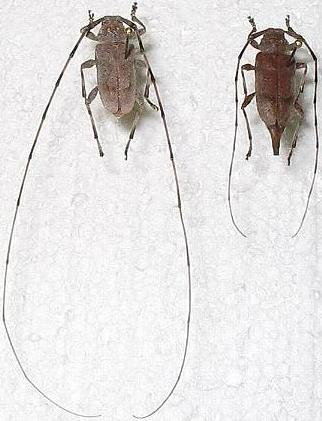

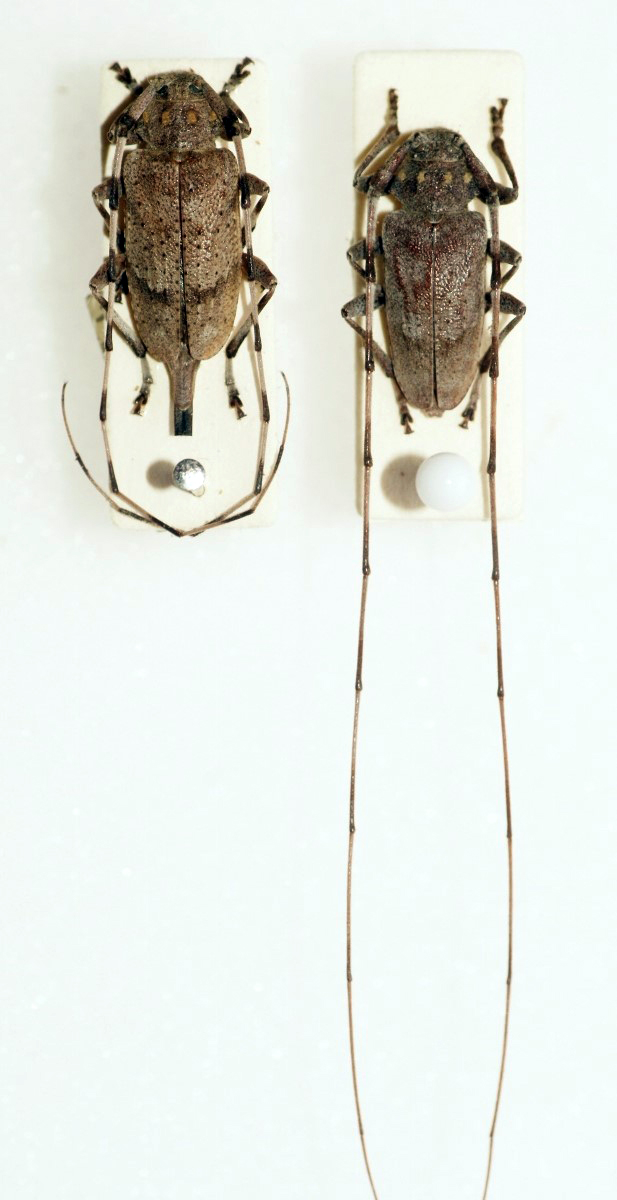

Scientific classification
- Kingdom: Animalia
- Phylum: Arthropoda
- Clade: Pancrustacea
- Class: Insecta
- Order: Coleoptera
- Suborder: Polyphaga
- Infraorder: Cucujiformia
- Family: Cerambycidae
- Genus: Acanthocinus
- Species: A. aedilis

Binomial name
- Acanthocinus aedilis (Linnaeus, 1758)

Synonyms
- Acanthocinus validus Matsushita, 1936; Cerambyx aedilis Linnaeus, 1767

= Timberman beetle =

Species of beetle

The timberman beetle (Acanthocinus aedilis) is a species of woodboring beetle belonging to the longhorn beetle family.

It is found in woodlands, with a large distribution through Europe, Russia and Central Asia. It is also known as the Siberian Timberman due to its range extending northwards in to Siberia. In Finnish this species is known as Sarvijaakko, in Dutch as Timmerboktor and in Swedish as Större Timmerman. Despite a few sources suggesting reports in Central America, no confirmed reports were available at time of editing (May, 2020). The species is also not listed as invasive in North America.

== Description ==
The body length ranges from 12-20mm, with antennae up for 3 times the body length in males, or 1.5 times the body length in females. The beetles grow to be 12 to 20 millimeters long. The ground is brown with fine grey-brown hairs (tomentum) on the dorsum, which creates an irregular pattern, making them hard to spot on bark. On the pronotum, which is wider than it is long and has a pointed bump on each side, there are four small yellow tomentum spots visible. The body is elongated. The etytra are short part of the posterior abdomen is exposed. The elytra also have two slanted dark cross bands. Both the thread-like antennae and the legs are alternately brown and black

== Biology ==
Their lifespan is up to 3 years which includes the 1–2 years spent in the larval stage.

This species is capable of surviving freezing temperatures below -37 °C in both the adult and larval stages. The adults are active from March to June, during which they are diurnal. The adults overwinter in pupal chambers in leaf litter or under the bark.

In Continental Europe, this species has become a serious pest of commercially-grown timber as the larvae feed under the bark, weakening the trees. Through infesting weakened trees, excavating galleries under the bark, the trees then die. Their development within wood debris in natural forests is beneficial for nutrient cycling in forest ecosystems, but can also facilitate the transfer of pathogenic fungi within woodlands. Scots pine (Pinus sylvestris L.) and Norway Spruce (Picea abies) are key food sources for this beetle species.

A distribution map within the UK can be found courtesy of the National Biodiversity Network. The species is reported to be Nationally Scarce category B within Great Britain by the Wildlife Trust BCN in 2018.
