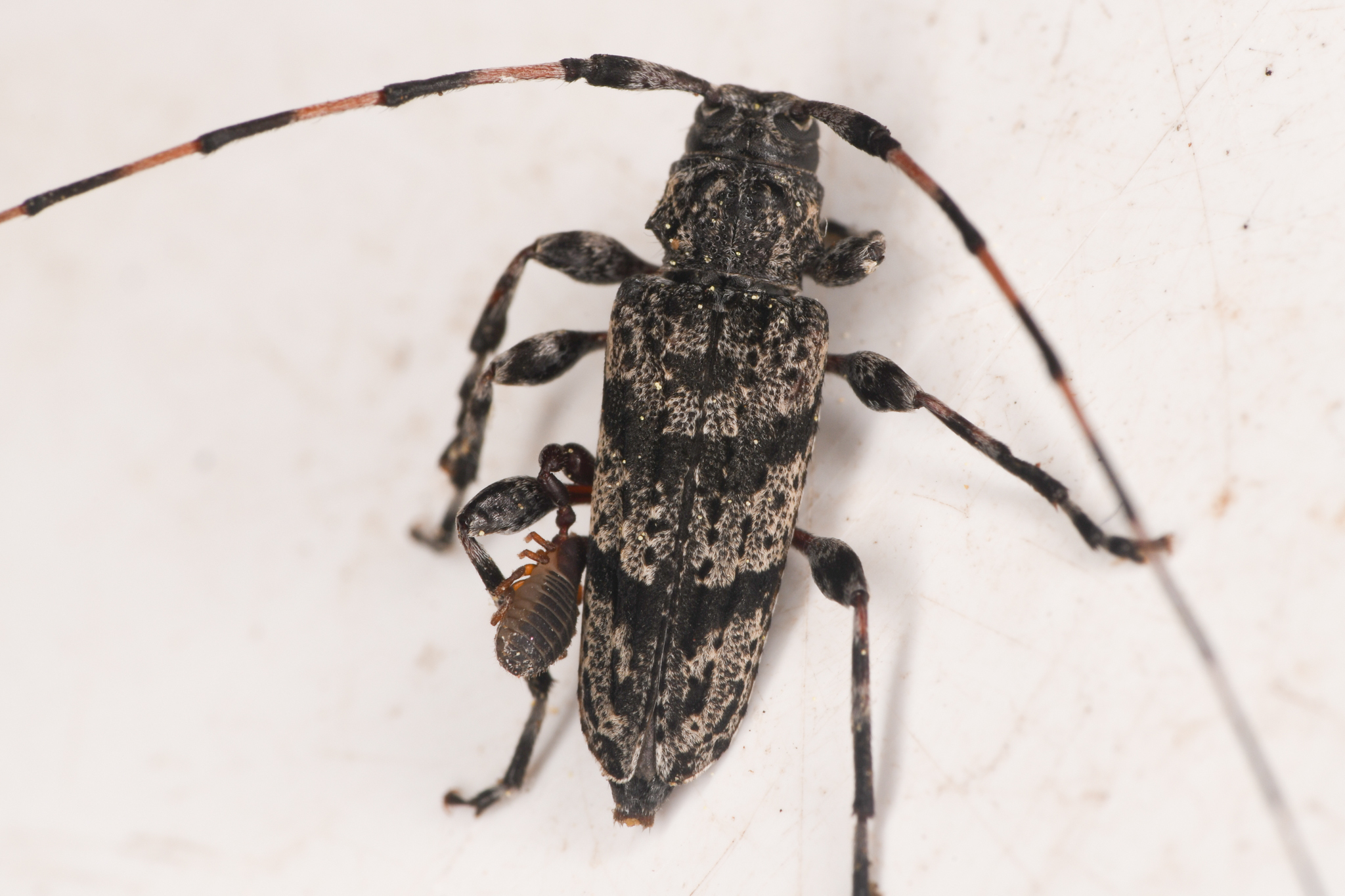

Scientific classification
- Domain: Eukaryota
- Kingdom: Animalia
- Phylum: Arthropoda
- Class: Insecta
- Order: Coleoptera
- Suborder: Polyphaga
- Infraorder: Cucujiformia
- Family: Cerambycidae
- Genus: Acanthocinus
- Species: A. obliquus

Binomial name
- Acanthocinus obliquus (LeConte, 1862)

= Acanthocinus obliquus =

Species of beetle

Acanthocinus obliquus is a species of longhorn beetle of the subfamily Lamiinae. It was described by John Lawrence LeConte in 1862.
