= Amsinckia marginata =

Conservation status
- Critically Endangered (IUCN 3.1)

Scientific classification
- Kingdom: Plantae
- Clade: Tracheophytes
- Clade: Angiosperms
- Clade: Eudicots
- Clade: Asterids
- Order: Boraginales
- Family: Boraginaceae
- Genus: Amsinckia
- Species: A. marginata

Binomial name
- Amsinckia marginata Brand

Species of flowering plant

Amsinckia marginata is a species of flowering plant in the family Boraginaceae. It is endemic to Ecuador. Its natural habitat is subtropical or tropical moist montane forests. It is threatened by habitat loss.
