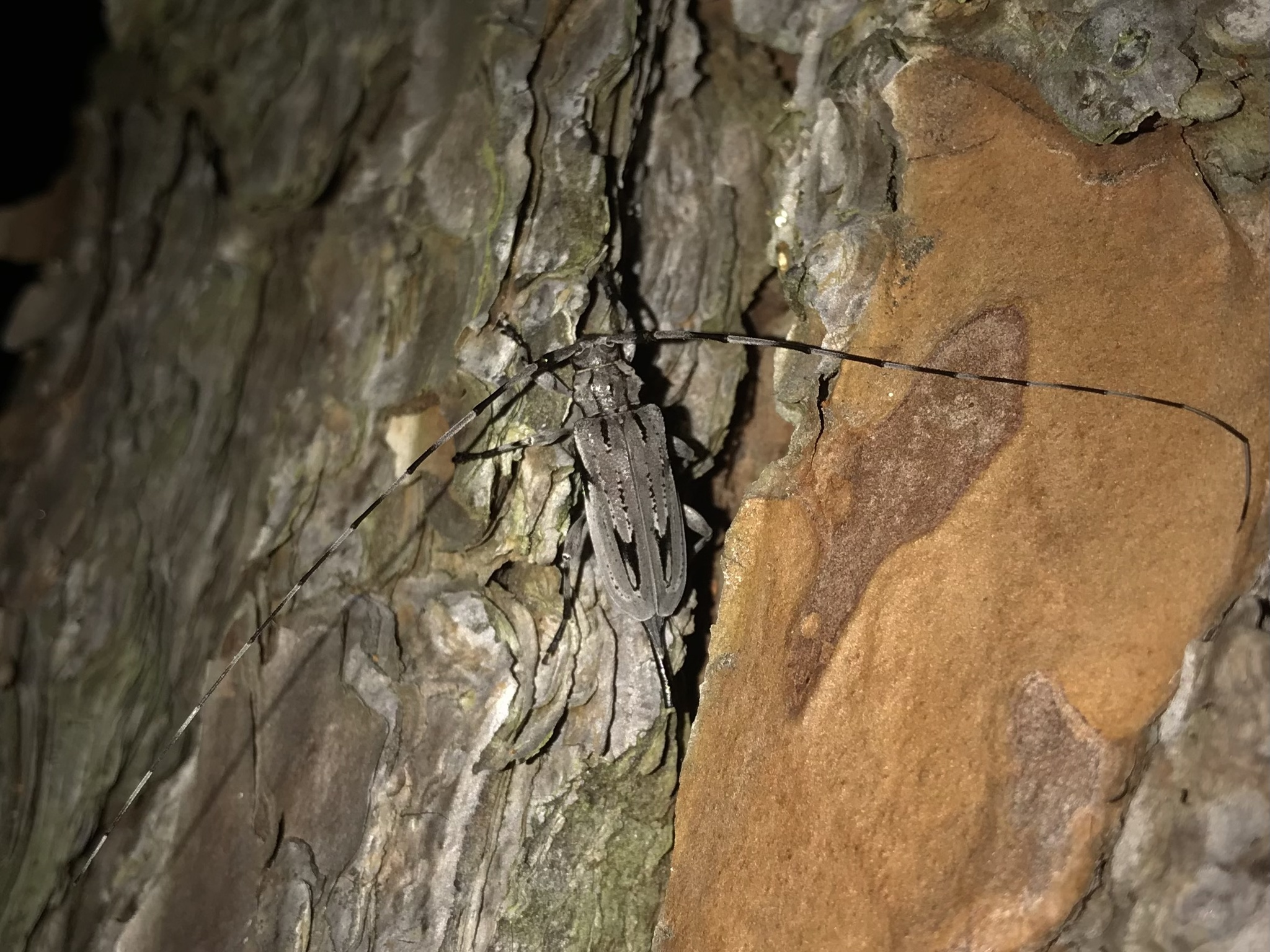

Scientific classification
- Domain: Eukaryota
- Kingdom: Animalia
- Phylum: Arthropoda
- Class: Insecta
- Order: Coleoptera
- Suborder: Polyphaga
- Infraorder: Cucujiformia
- Family: Cerambycidae
- Genus: Acanthocinus
- Species: A. nodosus

Binomial name
- Acanthocinus nodosus (Fabricius, 1775)

= Acanthocinus nodosus =

Species of beetle

Acanthocinus nodosus is a species of longhorn beetles of the subfamily Lamiinae. It was described by Johan Christian Fabricius in 1775.
