= Anthophrys =

Scientific classification
- Domain: Eukaryota
- Kingdom: Animalia
- Phylum: Arthropoda
- Class: Insecta
- Order: Lepidoptera
- Superfamily: Noctuoidea
- Family: Noctuidae
- Subfamily: Acronictinae
- Genus: Anthophrys; Diakonoff, 1960

Genus of tortrix moths

Anthophrys is a genus of moths belonging to the subfamily Tortricinae of the family Tortricidae. The genus was erected by Alexey Diakonoff in 1960.

== Species ==
- Anthophrys spectabilis Diakonoff, 1960

== See also ==
- List of Tortricidae genera
