= Acanthocinus henschi =

Scientific classification
- Kingdom: Animalia
- Phylum: Arthropoda
- Class: Insecta
- Order: Coleoptera
- Suborder: Polyphaga
- Infraorder: Cucujiformia
- Family: Cerambycidae
- Genus: Acanthocinus
- Species: A. henschi

Binomial name
- Acanthocinus henschi Reitter, 1900

Species of beetle

Acanthocinus henschi is a species of longhorn beetles of the subfamily Lamiinae. It was described by Reitter in 1900, and is known from Austria, Croatia, Italy, and Macedonia. The beetles measure 7-11 millimetres in length, and live for approximately 1–2 years. They inhabit trees in the species Pinus nigra.
