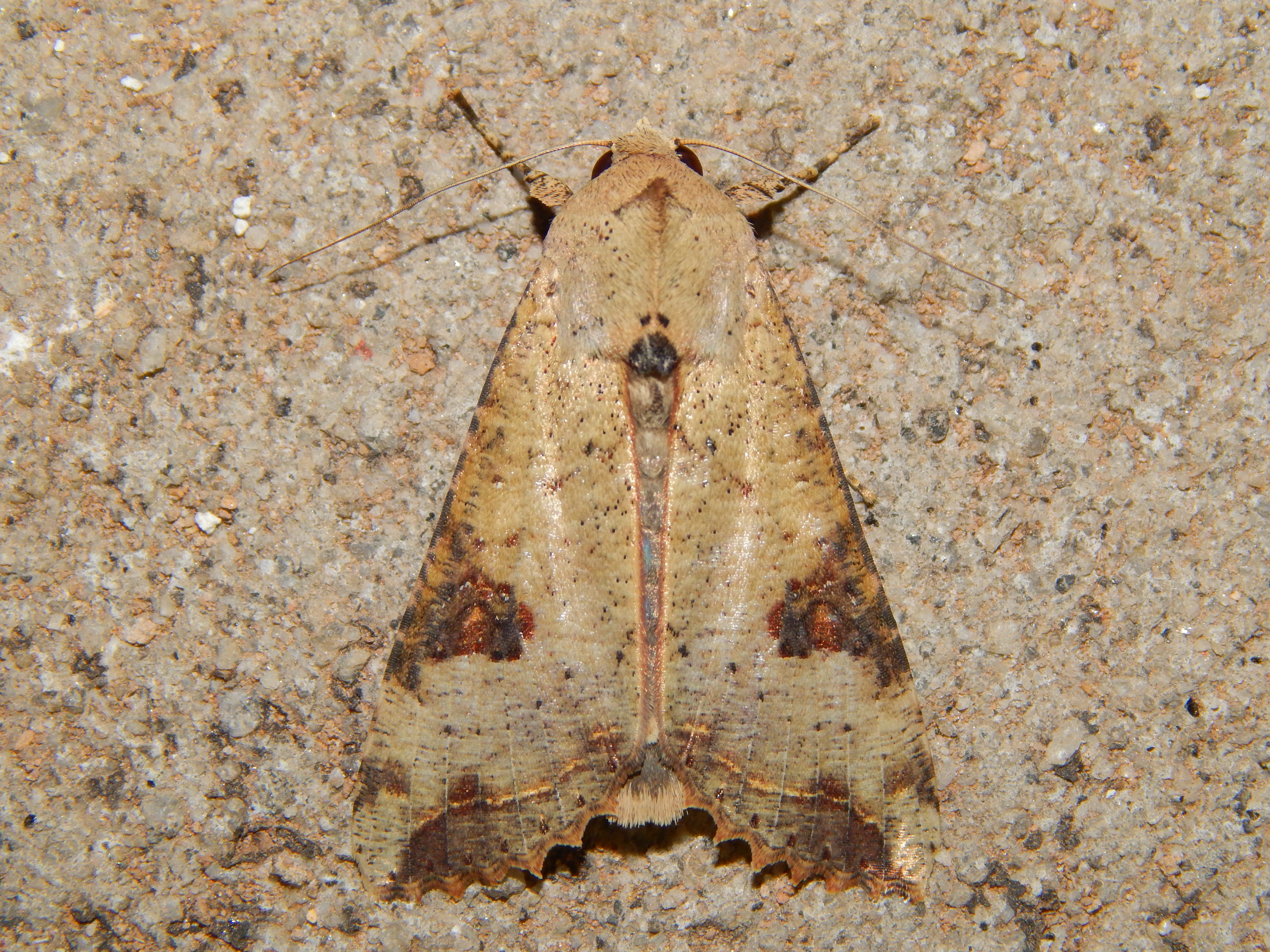

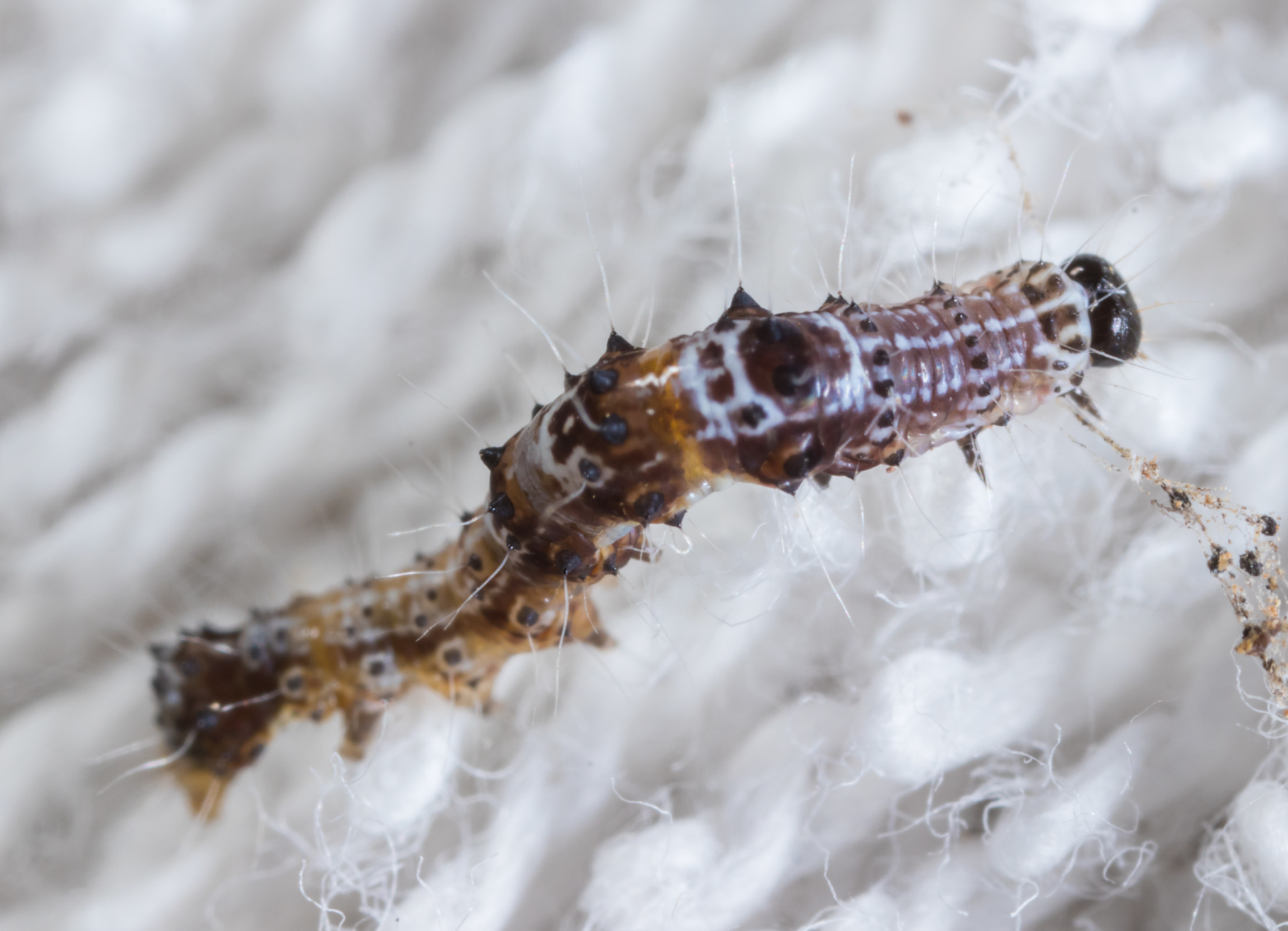
- caterpillar

Scientific classification
- Kingdom: Animalia
- Phylum: Arthropoda
- Clade: Pancrustacea
- Class: Insecta
- Order: Lepidoptera
- Superfamily: Noctuoidea
- Family: Noctuidae
- Genus: Tiracola
- Species: T. aureata

Binomial name
- Tiracola aureata Holloway, 1989

= Tiracola aureata =

Moth of the family Noctuidae

Tiracola aureata is a moth of the family Noctuidae first described by Jeremy Daniel Holloway in 1989. It is found from India and from China to Sundaland.
