= Acanthocinus elegans =

Scientific classification
- Kingdom: Animalia
- Phylum: Arthropoda
- Class: Insecta
- Order: Coleoptera
- Suborder: Polyphaga
- Infraorder: Cucujiformia
- Family: Cerambycidae
- Genus: Acanthocinus
- Species: A. elegans

Binomial name
- Acanthocinus elegans Ganglbauer, 1884

Species of beetle

Acanthocinus elegans is a species of longhorn beetles of the subfamily Lamiinae. It was described by Ludwig Ganglbauer in 1884, and is endemic to Iran. The beetles live approximately one year, and inhabit deciduous trees.
