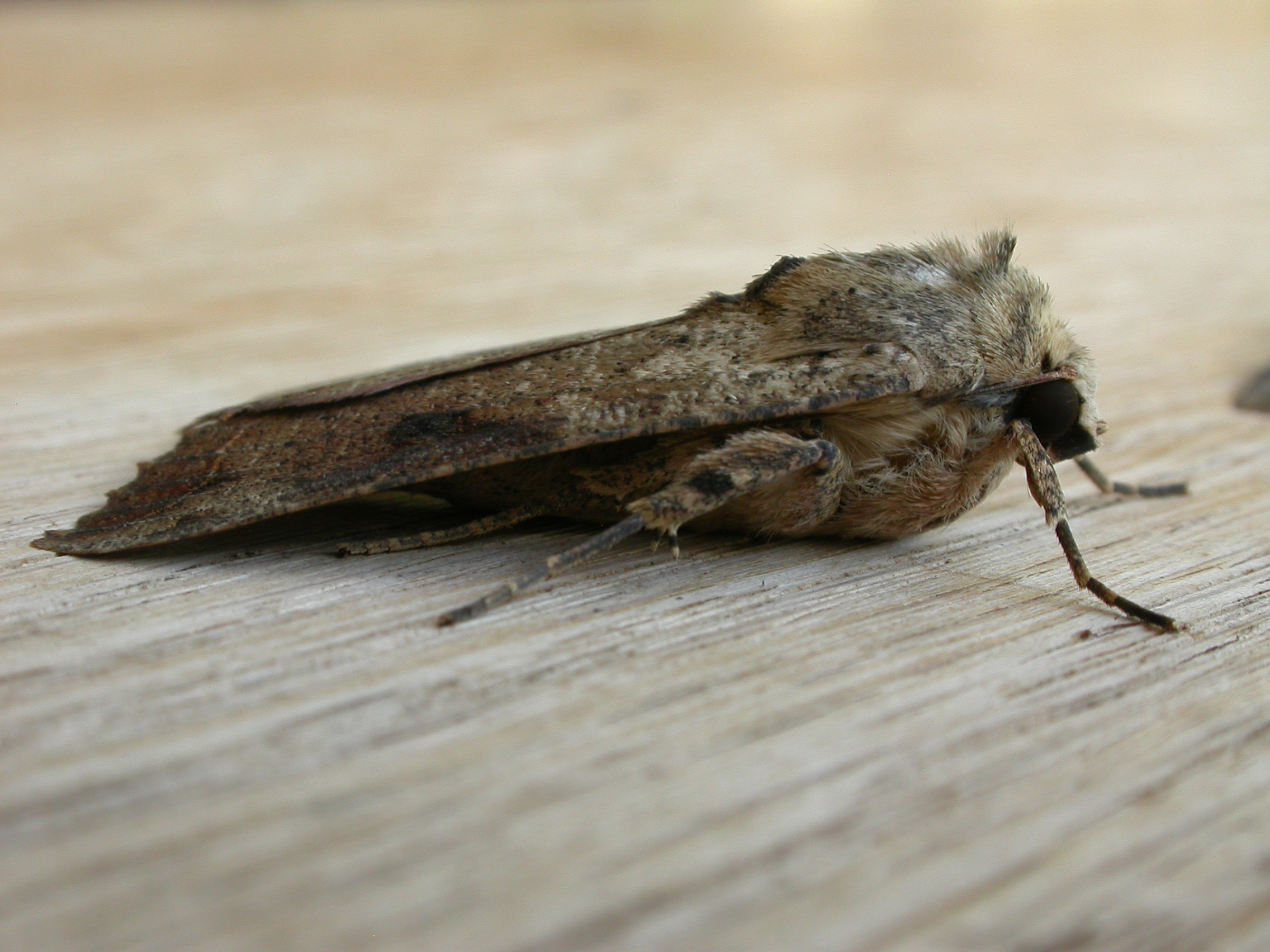
- Tiracola plagiata

Scientific classification
- Domain: Eukaryota
- Kingdom: Animalia
- Phylum: Arthropoda
- Class: Insecta
- Order: Lepidoptera
- Superfamily: Noctuoidea
- Family: Noctuidae
- Subfamily: Hadeninae
- Genus: Tiracola; Moore, 1881

= Tiracola =

Genus of moths

Tiracola is a genus of moths of the family Noctuidae.

== Species ==
- Tiracola aureata Holloway, 1989
- Tiracola circularis (Holloway, 1979)
- Tiracola grandirena (Herrich-Schäffer, 1868)
- Tiracola lilacea Dognin, 1914
- Tiracola magusina Draudt, 1950
- Tiracola minima Prout, 1926
- Tiracola nonconformens Dyar, 1918
- Tiracola plagiata (Walker, 1857)
- Tiracola rufimargo Warren, 1912
- Tiracola tabwemasana Holloway, 1979
- Tiracola versicolor Prout, 1922
