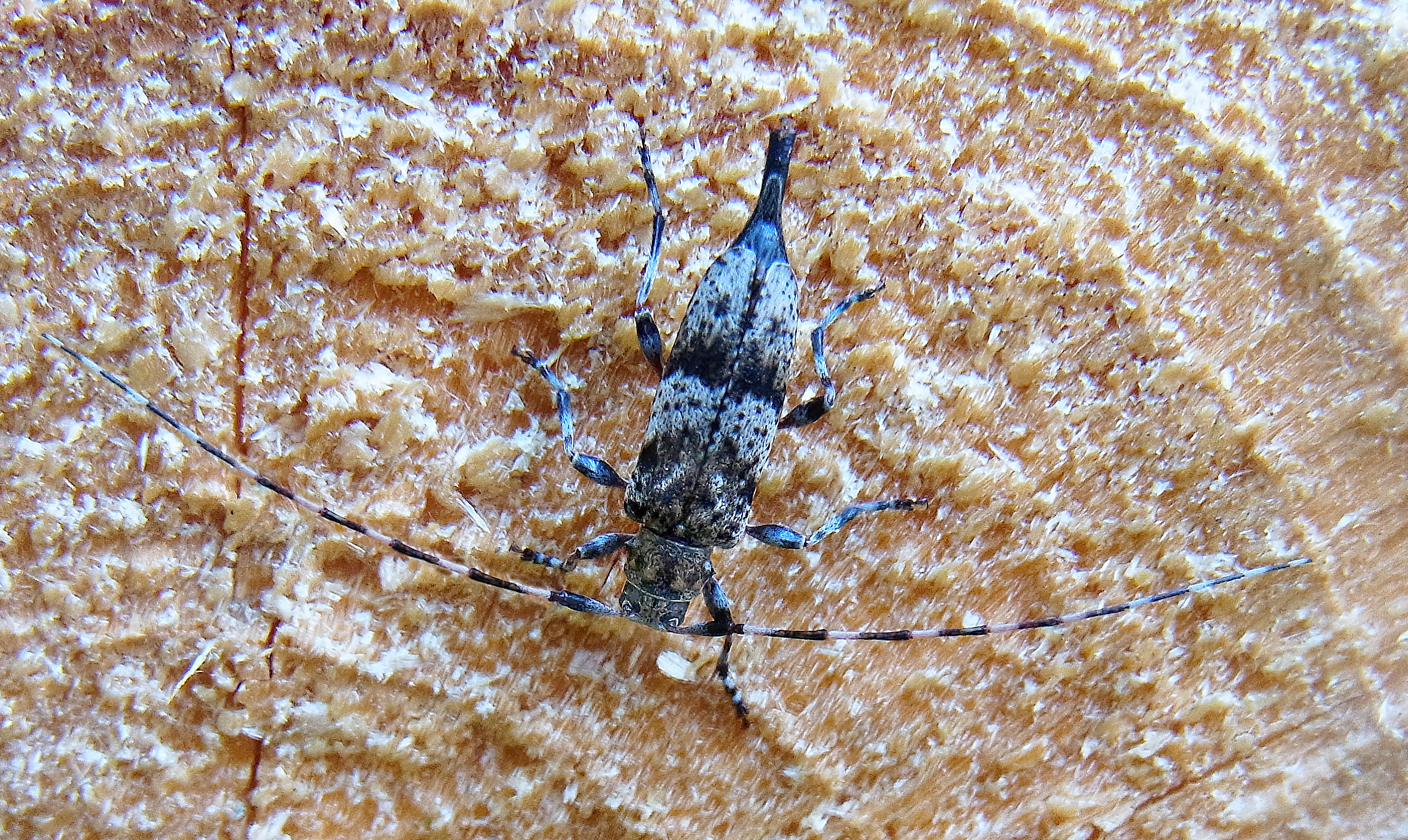

Scientific classification
- Kingdom: Animalia
- Phylum: Arthropoda
- Clade: Pancrustacea
- Class: Insecta
- Order: Coleoptera
- Suborder: Polyphaga
- Infraorder: Cucujiformia
- Family: Cerambycidae
- Genus: Acanthocinus
- Species: A. griseus

Binomial name
- Acanthocinus griseus (Fabricius, 1792)

= Acanthocinus griseus =

Species of beetle

Acanthocinus griseus is a species of longhorn beetle of the subfamily Lamiinae. It was described by Johan Christian Fabricius in 1792 and is known from Europe, Russia, and Asia Minor. The beetles are 8-13 millimetres long and live for approximately 1–2 years. They inhabit coniferous trees including those in the genera Pinus, Picea, and Abies. They are also known to inhabit oaks.
