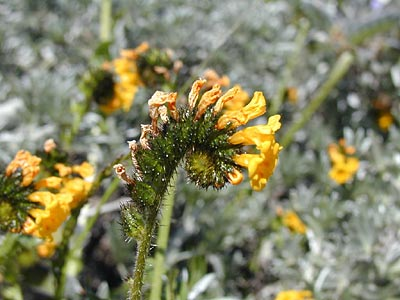

Scientific classification
- Kingdom: Plantae
- Clade: Tracheophytes
- Clade: Angiosperms
- Clade: Eudicots
- Clade: Asterids
- Order: Boraginales
- Family: Boraginaceae
- Genus: Amsinckia
- Species: A. spectabilis

Binomial name
- Amsinckia spectabilis Fisch. & C.A.Mey.

= Amsinckia spectabilis =

Species of flowering plant

Amsinckia spectabilis is a species of fiddleneck known by the common names seaside fiddleneck and woolly breeches. It is native to the west coast of North America from British Columbia to Baja California, where it grows in sandy habitat, including direct coastline.

== Description ==
Amsinckia spectabilis is a bristly annual herb similar in appearance to other fiddlenecks. The leaves are sometimes edged with fine teeth. The coiled inflorescence holds tubular yellow flowers up to 2 centimetres (0.8 in) long and 1.5 centimetres (0.6 in) wide at the face.
