= Anthophrys spectabilis =

Scientific classification
- Domain: Eukaryota
- Kingdom: Animalia
- Phylum: Arthropoda
- Class: Insecta
- Order: Lepidoptera
- Superfamily: Noctuoidea
- Family: Noctuidae
- Genus: Anthophrys
- Species: A. spectabilis

Binomial name
- Anthophrys spectabilis Diakonoff, 1960

Species of moth

Anisotenes uniformis is a species of moth of the family Tortricidae, which is found in Madagascar.
