= Apalochlamys =

Scientific classification
- Kingdom: Plantae
- Clade: Tracheophytes
- Clade: Angiosperms
- Clade: Eudicots
- Clade: Asterids
- Order: Asterales
- Family: Asteraceae
- Subfamily: Asteroideae
- Tribe: Gnaphalieae
- Genus: Apalochlamys; Cassini
- Species: A. spectabilis

Binomial name
- Apalochlamys spectabilis (Labillardière) J.H.Willis

Genus of plants

Apalochlamys spectabilis

Apalochlamys is a genus of flowering plants in the family Asteraceae. The sole species in the genus is Apalochlamys spectabilis, commonly known as showy cassinia or fireweed.
