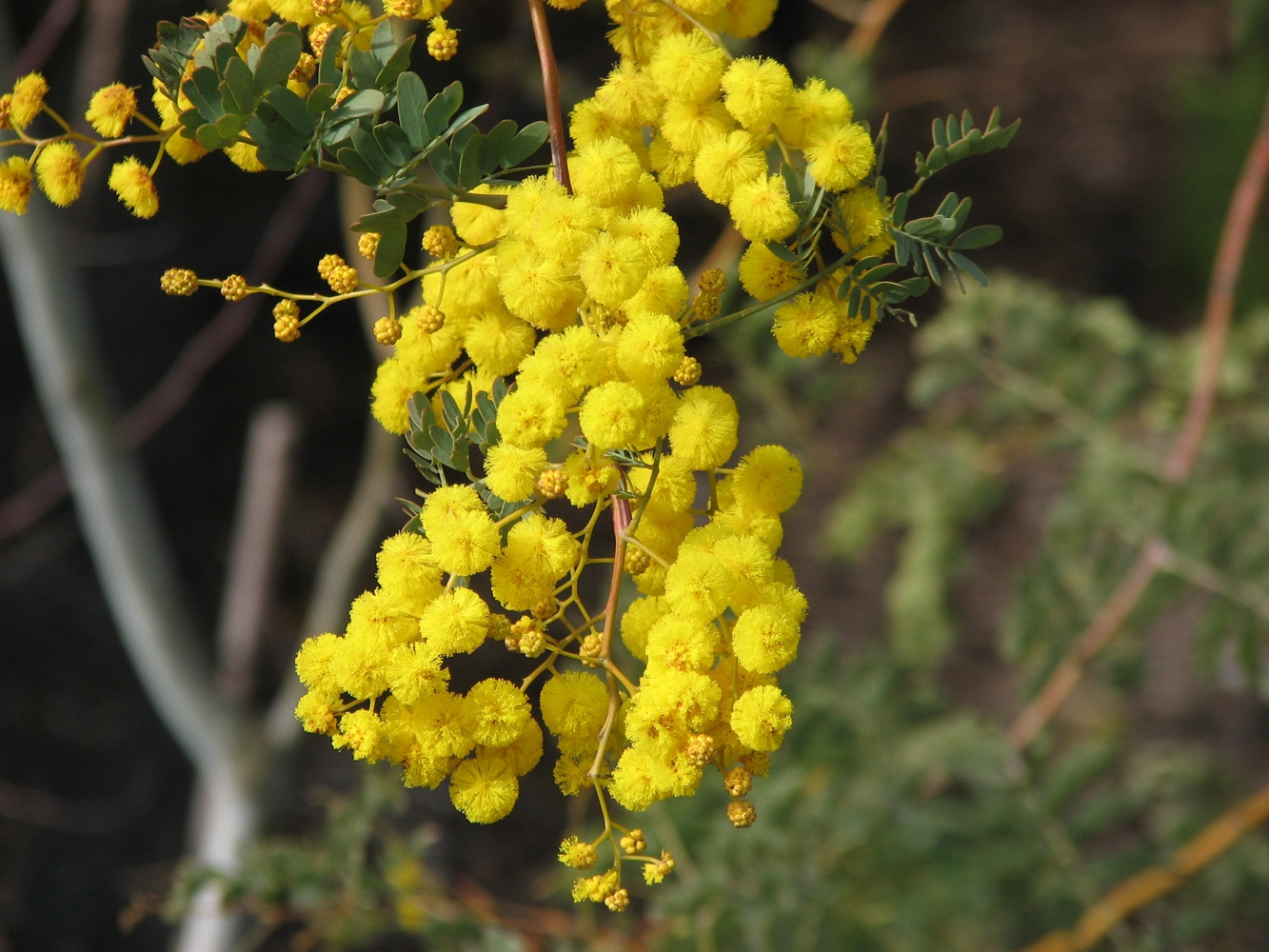
- In the Royal Botanic Gardens, Cranbourne

Conservation status
- Least Concern (IUCN 3.1)

Scientific classification
- Kingdom: Plantae
- Clade: Embryophytes
- Clade: Tracheophytes
- Clade: Spermatophytes
- Clade: Angiosperms
- Clade: Eudicots
- Clade: Rosids
- Order: Fabales
- Family: Fabaceae
- Subfamily: Caesalpinioideae
- Clade: Mimosoid clade
- Genus: Acacia
- Species: A. spectabilis

Binomial name
- Acacia spectabilis A.Cunn. ex Benth.
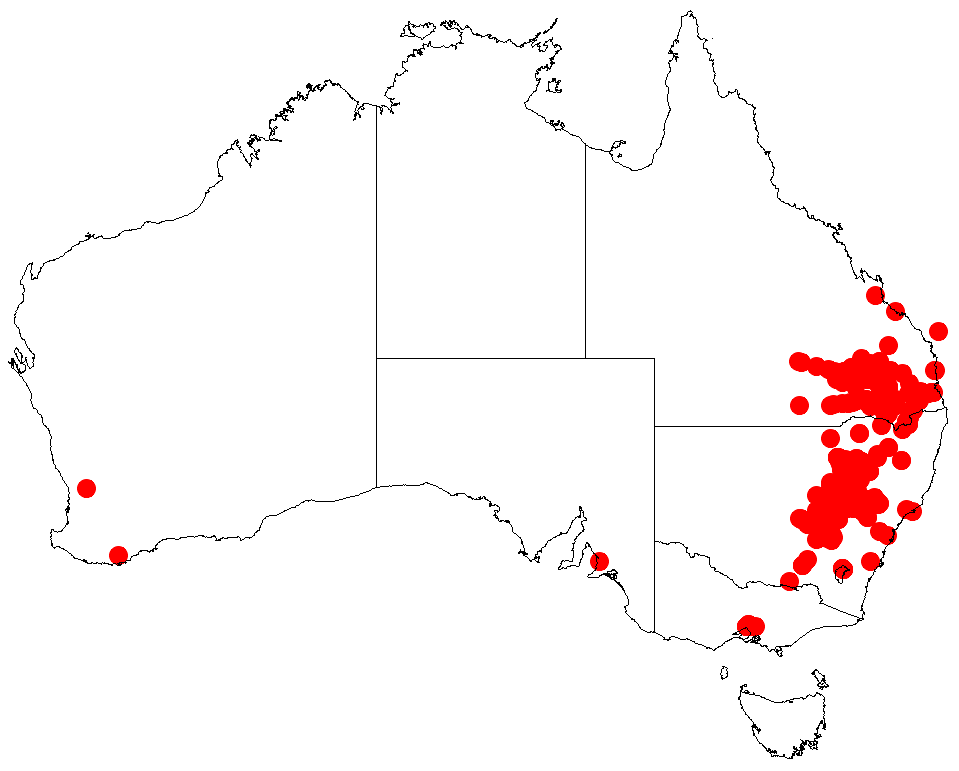
- Occurrence data from AVH

Synonyms
- Racosperma spectabile (A.Cunn. ex Benth.) Pedley

= Acacia spectabilis =

Species of legume

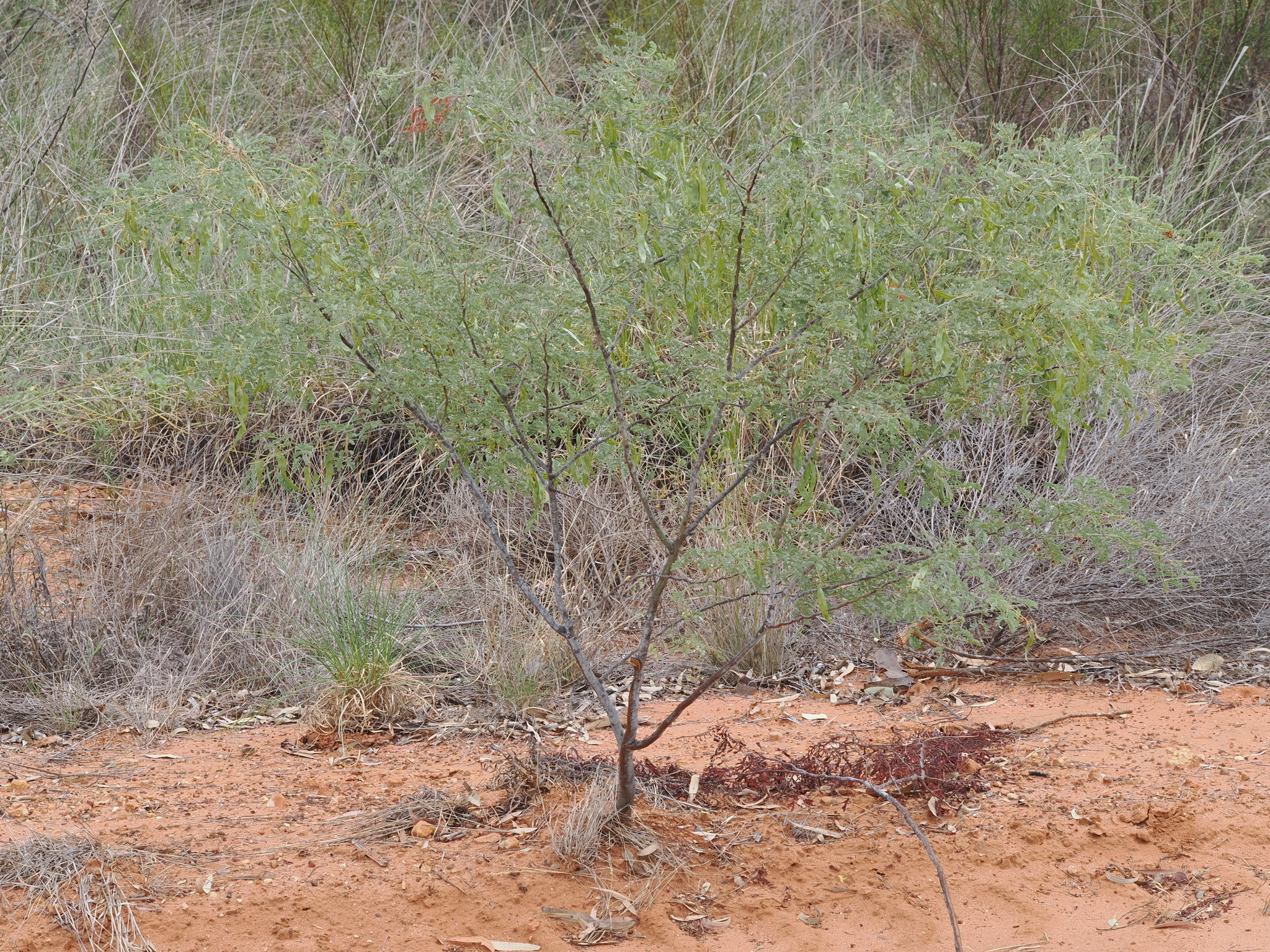
Habit near Alton National Park

Acacia spectabilis, commonly known as Mudgee wattle, is an erect or spreading shrub, endemic to Australia.

It grows to between 1.5 and 4 metres high and has pinnate leaves. The bright-yellow globular flowerheads appear in axillary racemes, mostly between July and November in its native range. These are followed by thin leathery pods which are 4–17 cm long and 10–19 mm wide.

The species occurs naturally in dry sclerophyll forest and heath in New South Wales and Queensland and is commonly cultivated.
