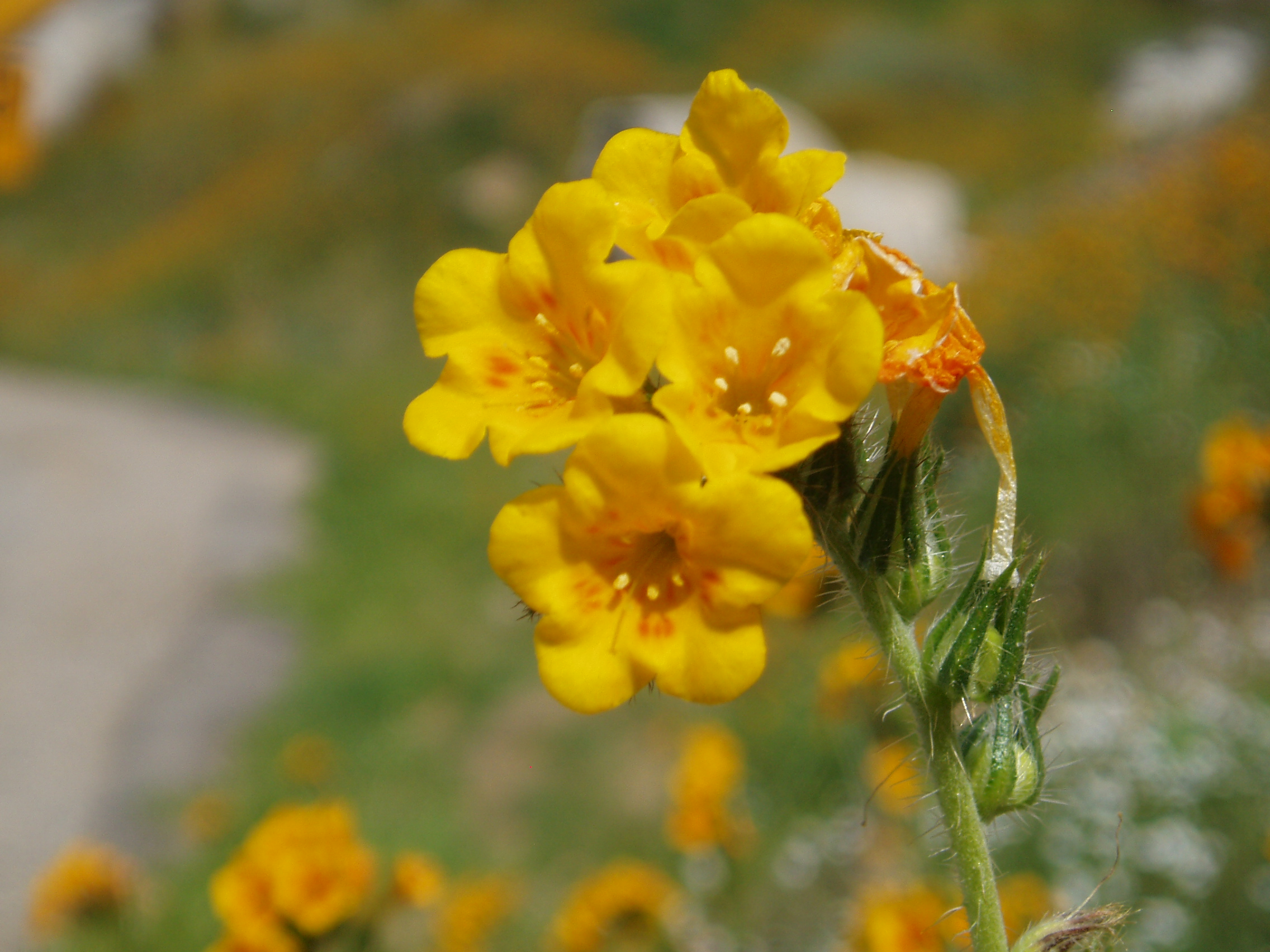
- Amsinckia eastwoodiae

Scientific classification
- Kingdom: Plantae
- Clade: Embryophytes
- Clade: Tracheophytes
- Clade: Spermatophytes
- Clade: Angiosperms
- Clade: Eudicots
- Clade: Asterids
- Order: Boraginales
- Family: Boraginaceae
- Subfamily: Boraginoideae
- Genus: Amsinckia; Lehm.

Type species
- Amsinckia lycopsoides

Species
- Amsinckia calycina Amsinckia carinata Amsinckia douglasiana Amsinckia eastwoodiae Amsinckia grandiflora Amsinckia intermedia Amsinckia lunaris Amsinckia lycopsoides Amsinckia marginata Amsinckia menziesii Amsinckia spectabilis Amsinckia tessellata Amsinckia vernicosa

= Amsinckia =

Fiddleneck

Genus of flowering plants in the borage family

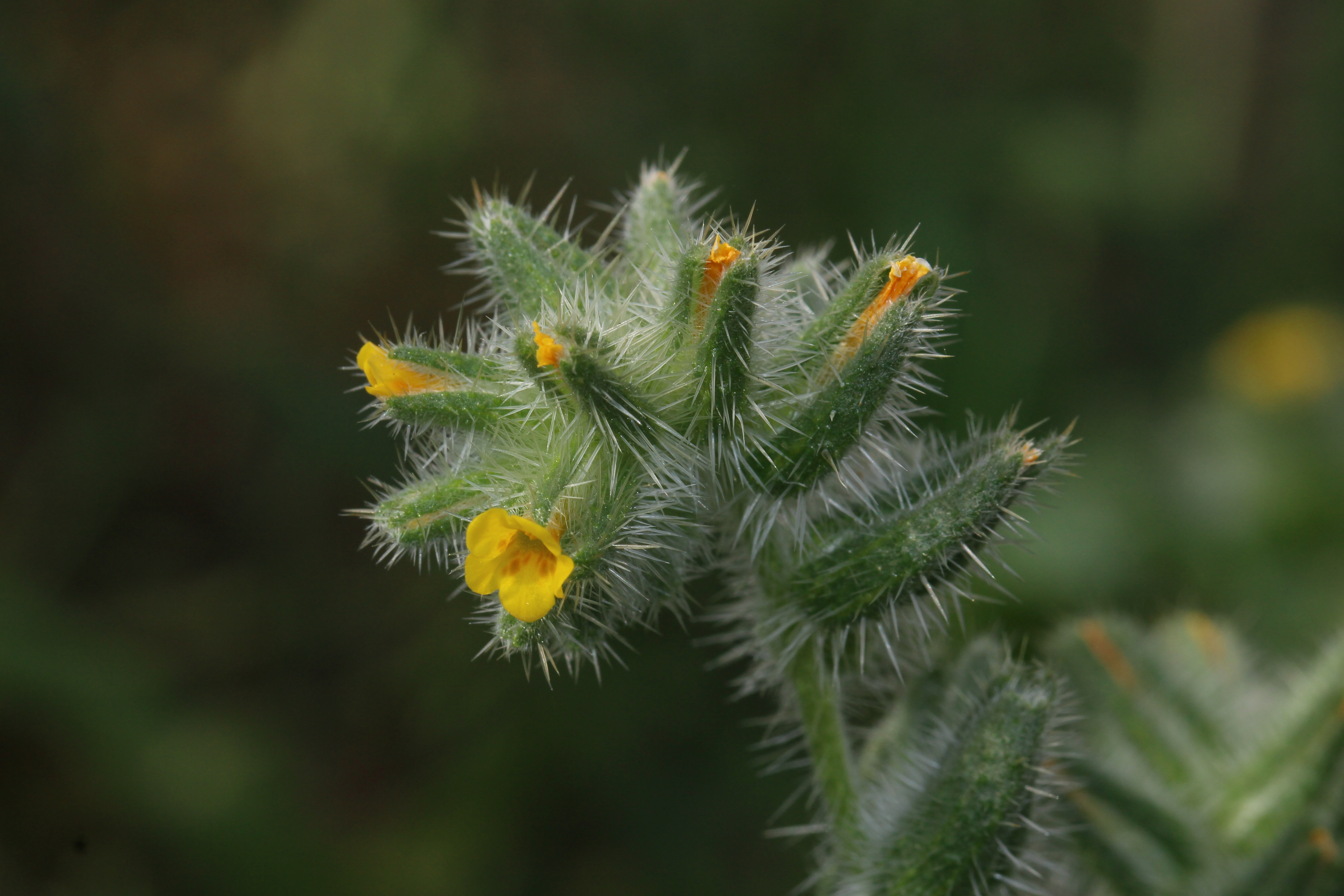
Amsinckia tessellata

Amsinckia is a genus of flowering plants commonly known as fiddlenecks. The common name is derived from the flower stems, which curl over at the top in a manner reminiscent of the head of a fiddle. Fiddlenecks are in the family Boraginaceae, along with borage and forget-me-nots. The genus is named after the patrician Amsinck family in honour of the Hamburg head of state and patron of botany Wilhelm Amsinck (1752–1831).

== Distribution and description ==
The fiddlenecks are native to western North America and south-western South America, but they are naturalized in other regions. They are annuals, many of them bristly. Most have an erect stem, whose height varies from 20 to 120 cm (7.9 to 47 in). In most species the flowers are yellow, often with an orange tinge. Most are found at relatively low altitudes, below 500 metres (1,600 ft).

The seeds and foliage of fiddlenecks are poisonous to livestock, particularly cattle, because they contain alkaloids and high concentrations of nitrates. The sharp hairs of the plants can cause skin irritation in humans. However, the shoots, seeds or leaves of several species were used as food by Native Americans, and the plant also had some medicinal uses.

The species are hard to distinguish, and their ranges overlap; furthermore, several of them have large numbers of slightly different varieties, and several of the species hybridise naturally. To decide which species a particular specimen belongs to, therefore, is likely to require a detailed examination with an identification key in hand.

== Species ==
- Amsinckia calycina, Hairy fiddleneck or yellow burweed – Native to Argentina and Chile.
- Amsinckia carinata, Malheur fiddleneck – Rare. Endemic to Oregon and listed as endangered by the state. Has been considered to be a synonym of A. vernicosa, but this is implausible given the separation of their ranges.
- Amsinckia douglasiana, Douglas' fiddleneck – Uncommon. South Coast and Western Transverse Ranges of California
- Amsinckia eastwoodiae, Eastwood's fiddleneck – Lower-lying areas of central and southern California, west of the Sierra Nevada
- Amsinckia grandiflora, Large-flowered fiddleneck – Central Valley of California. Endemic to California and listed as endangered by the state and by the US federal government.
- Amsinckia lunaris, Bent-flowered fiddleneck – Uncommon. San Francisco Bay Area, Inner Coast Ranges and western Central Valley of California. Endemic to California and listed as fairly endangered by the state.
- Amsinckia lycopsoides, Tarweed fiddleneck – Common. Found in all the Pacific coast states of the US (though not east of the Sierra Nevada in California), and into Idaho to the east and British Columbia to the north
- Amsinckia marginata – Endemic to Ecuador.
- Amsinckia menziesii, Rancher's fireweed – Abundant throughout the western states of the US, in British Columbia and in Baja California, at heights of up to 1,700 metres (5,600 ft). Also found as an alien species in eastern North America and the Old World. Several varieties recognised.
- Amsinckia spectabilis, Seaside fiddleneck or woolly breeches – Found on the Pacific coast of North America from British Columbia to Baja California, and on offshore islands, at heights of up to 300 metres (980 ft).
- Amsinckia tessellata, Devil's lettuce or bristly fiddleneck – Common. Found at heights up to 2,200 metres (7,200 ft), in most of California, Arizona, Oregon and Washington; also found in South America. Absent from the Sierra Nevada and the north coastal regions of California. Several varieties recognised.
- Amsinckia vernicosa, Green fiddleneck – Uncommon. Found at heights of up to 1,500 metres (4,900 ft), in the south Coast Ranges of California and the Mojave Desert.
