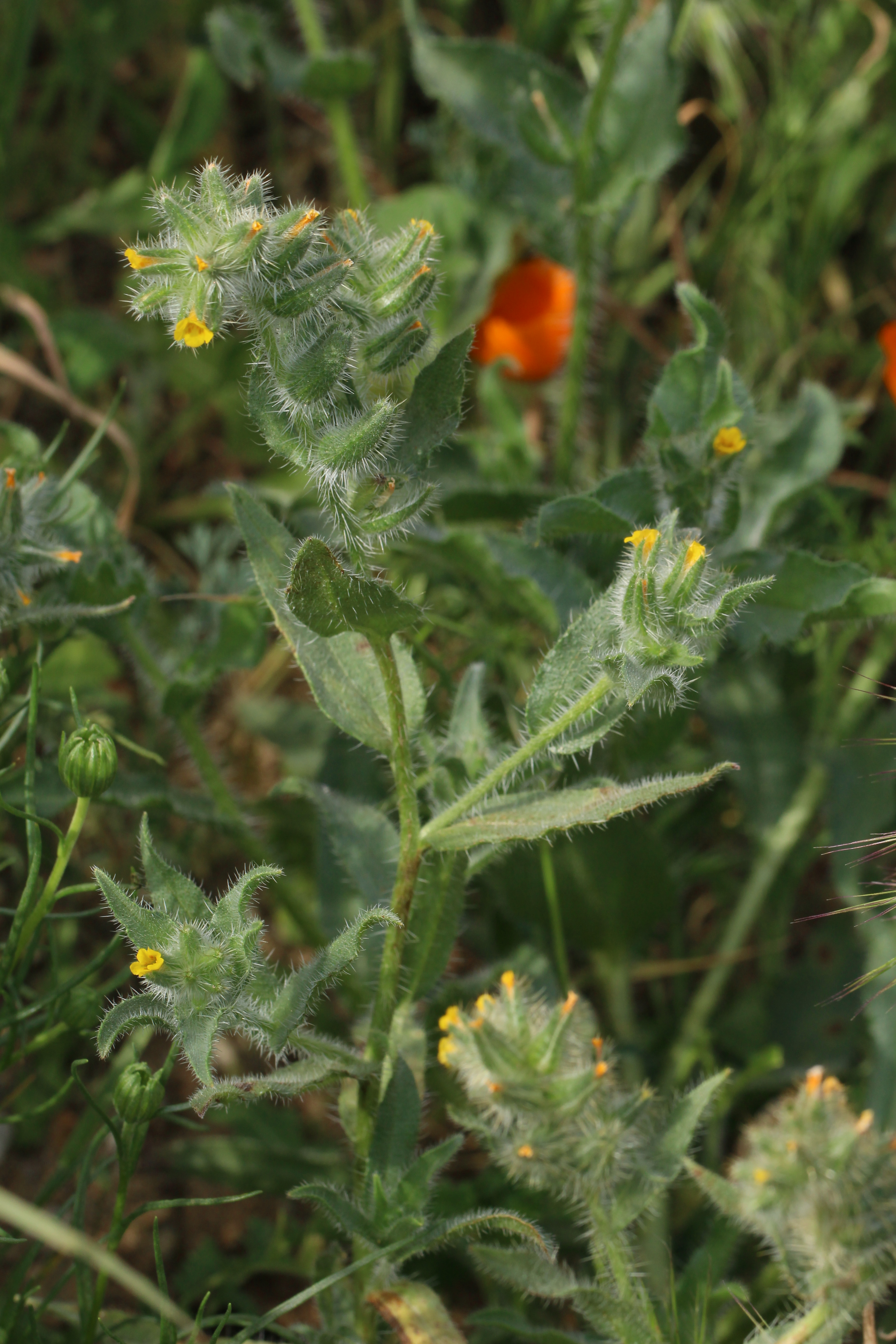

Scientific classification
- Kingdom: Plantae
- Clade: Tracheophytes
- Clade: Angiosperms
- Clade: Eudicots
- Clade: Asterids
- Order: Boraginales
- Family: Boraginaceae
- Genus: Amsinckia
- Species: A. tessellata

Binomial name
- Amsinckia tessellata A.Gray

= Amsinckia tessellata =

Species of flowering plant

Amsinckia tessellata is a species of fiddleneck known by the common names bristly fiddleneck, tessellate fiddleneck, checker fiddleneck, and devil's lettuce.

The plant is native to dry regions of western North America, more specifically eastern Washington and Idaho, much of California and the Great Basin, to southwest New Mexico (U.S.) and northwest Sonora and Baja California in Mexico, usually below 6,000 feet (1,800 m) elevation.

It is a common plant in many types of habitats, including chaparral, oak woodland, xeric scrub, temperate valleys, disturbed areas, and deserts including the Mojave Desert and Sonoran Desert.

== Description ==
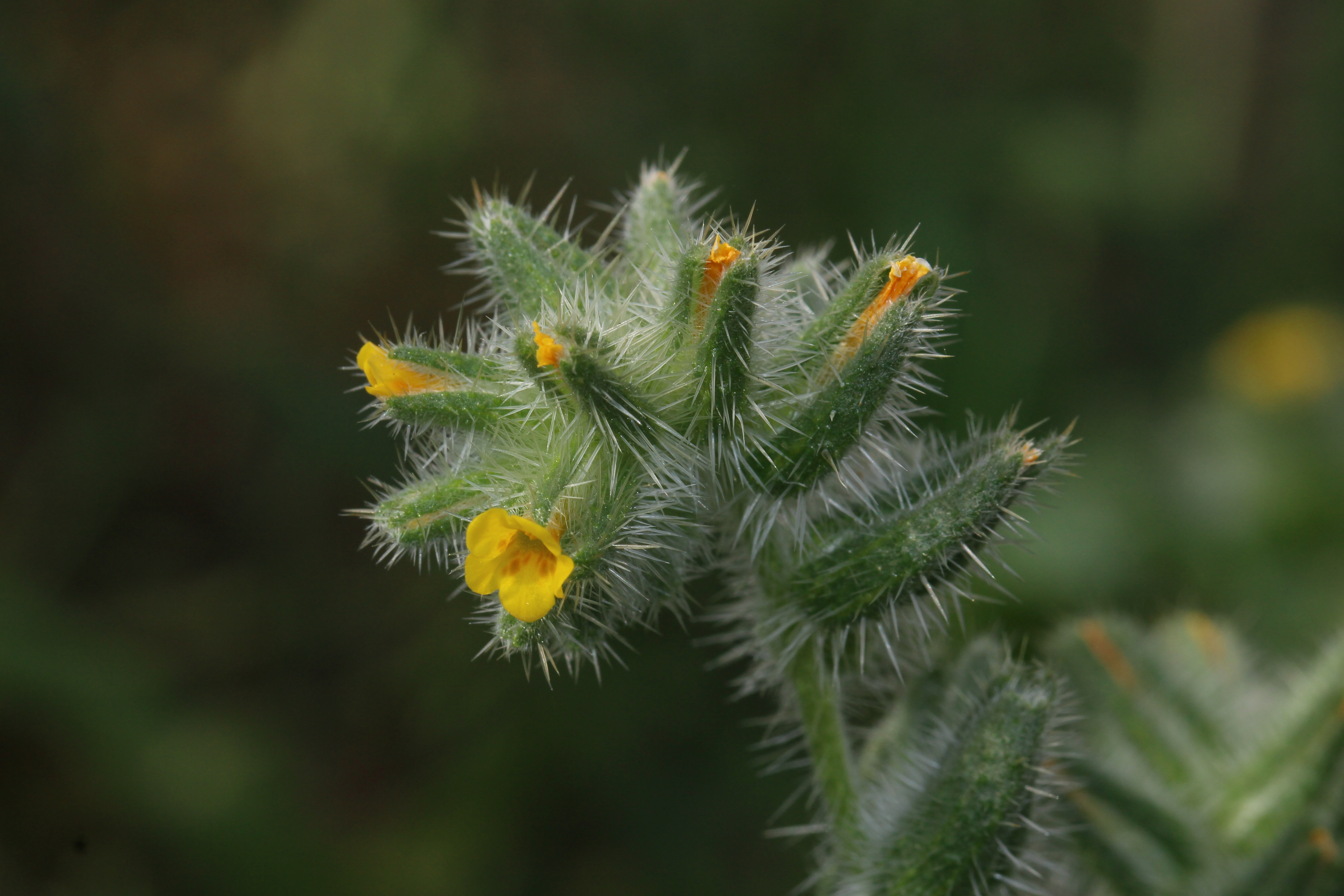
The A. tessellata's inflorescence bears flowers each with an orangish corolla and calyx with four lobes.

Amsinckia tessellata is an 8–24 inches tall bristly annual herb similar in appearance to other fiddlenecks.

Its coiled inflorescence holds yellow to orange tubular flowers up to a centimeter wide at the corolla, which often has fewer than five lobes. Calyx lobes are not uniform in width and may be fused below the middle. The bloom period is March to June.
