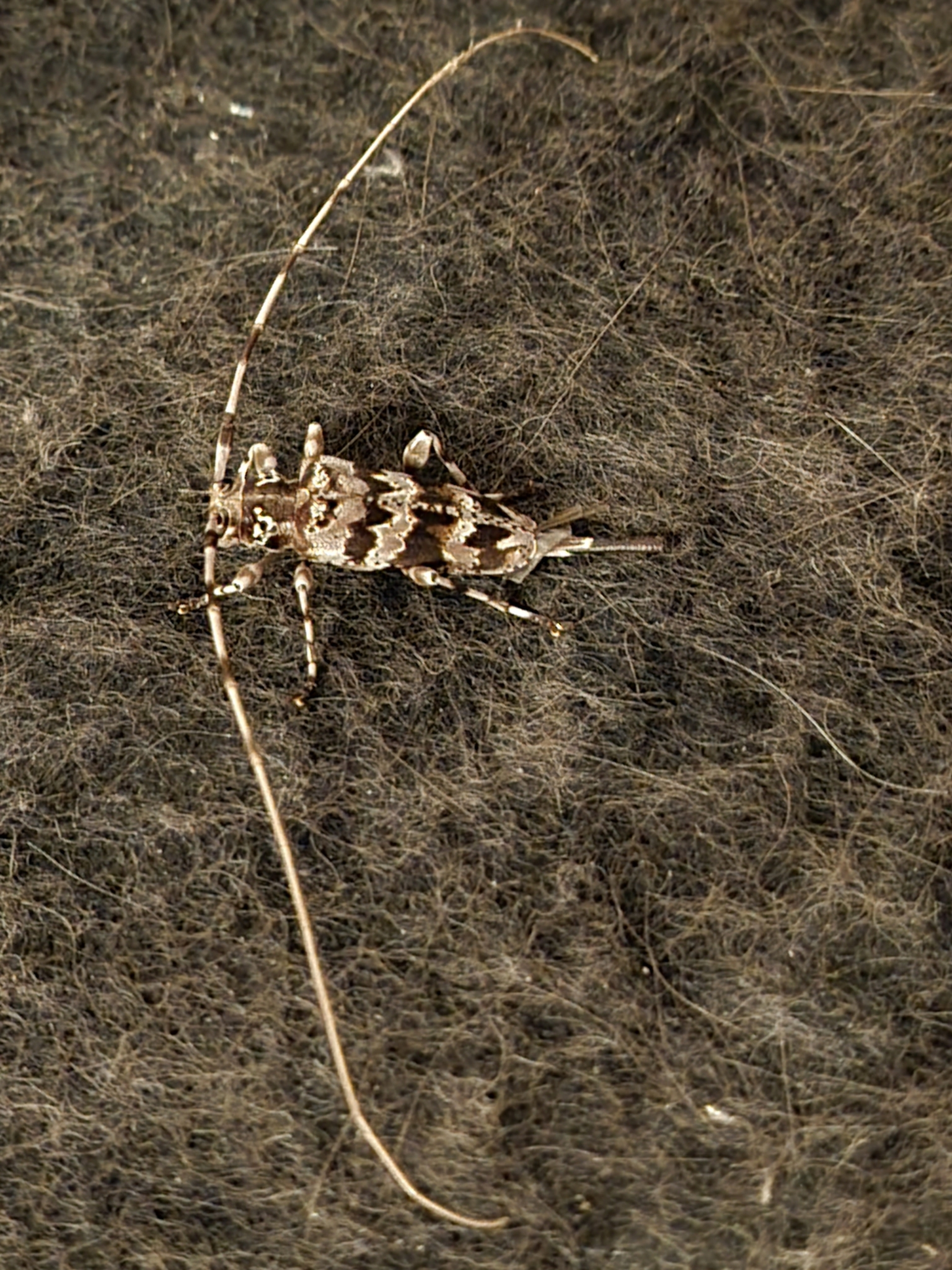

Scientific classification
- Domain: Eukaryota
- Kingdom: Animalia
- Phylum: Arthropoda
- Class: Insecta
- Order: Coleoptera
- Suborder: Polyphaga
- Infraorder: Cucujiformia
- Family: Cerambycidae
- Genus: Acanthocinus
- Species: A. spectabilis

Binomial name
- Acanthocinus spectabilis (LeConte, 1854)

= Acanthocinus spectabilis =

Species of beetle

Acanthocinus spectabilis is a species of longhorn beetles of the subfamily Lamiinae. It was described by John Lawrence LeConte in 1854.
