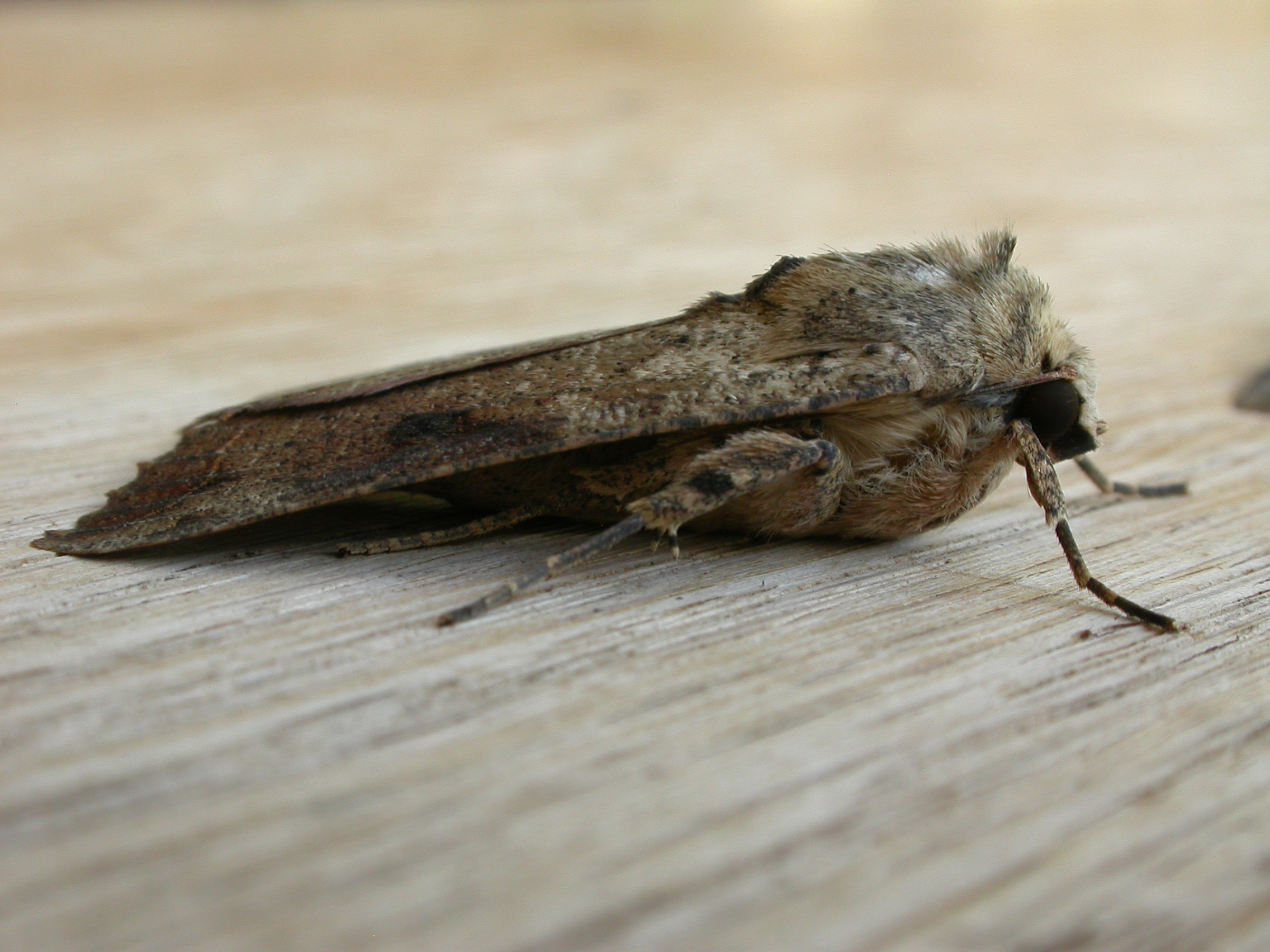

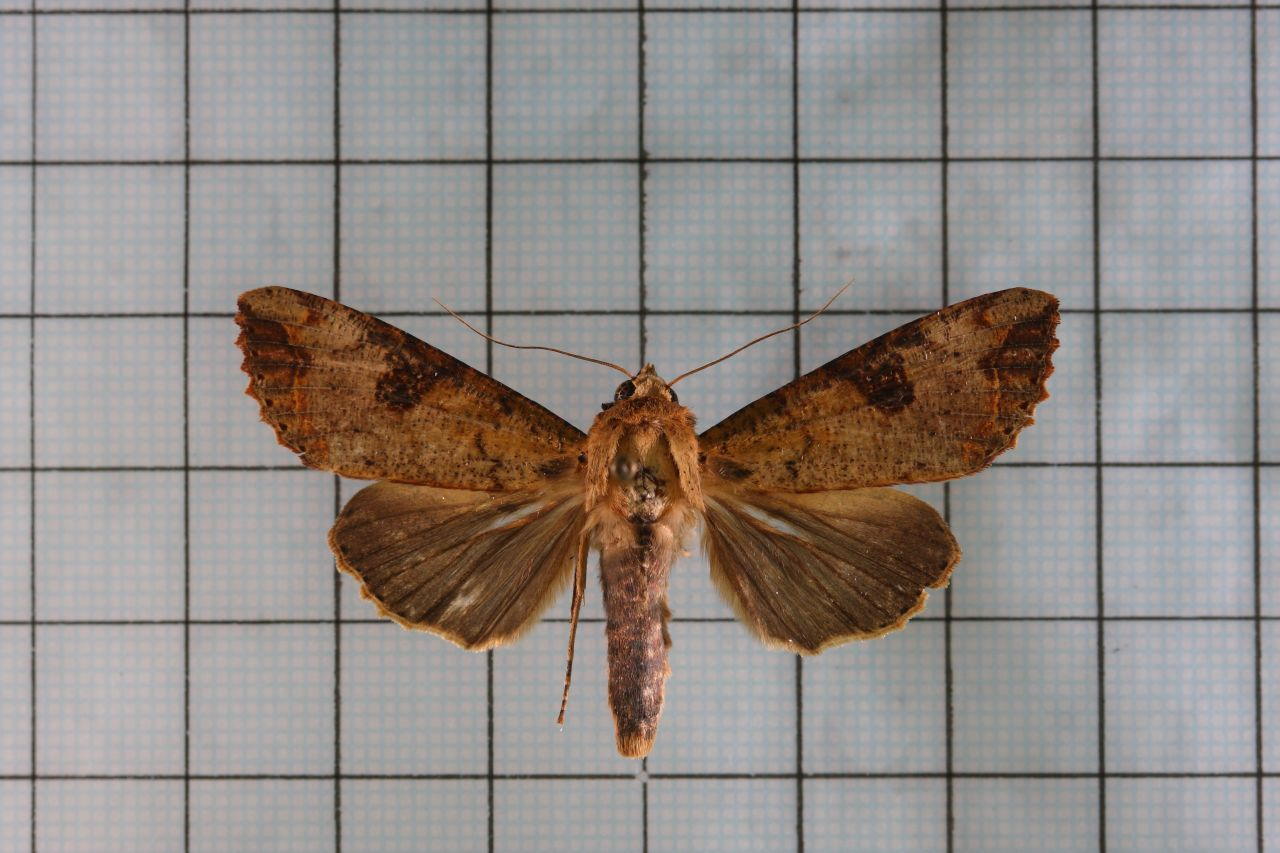

Scientific classification
- Kingdom: Animalia
- Phylum: Arthropoda
- Class: Insecta
- Order: Lepidoptera
- Superfamily: Noctuoidea
- Family: Noctuidae
- Genus: Tiracola
- Species: T. plagiata

Binomial name
- Tiracola plagiata (Walker, 1857)

Synonyms
- Agrotis plagiata Walker, 1857; Agrotis plagifera Walker, 1857; Agrotis spectabilis Walker, 1865; Tiracola nebulifera Warren, 1912; Tiracola plagiata uniformis Warren, 1912; Tiracola plagiata nigriclathrata Warren, 1915

= Tiracola plagiata =

Cacao armyworm

Species of moth

Tiracola plagiata, the cacao armyworm, is a species of moth in the family Noctuidae. The species was first described by Francis Walker in 1857. It is found from south-east Asia, southern India, Sri Lanka, Myanmar to the South Pacific Islands, including the northern two-thirds of Australia.

== Description ==
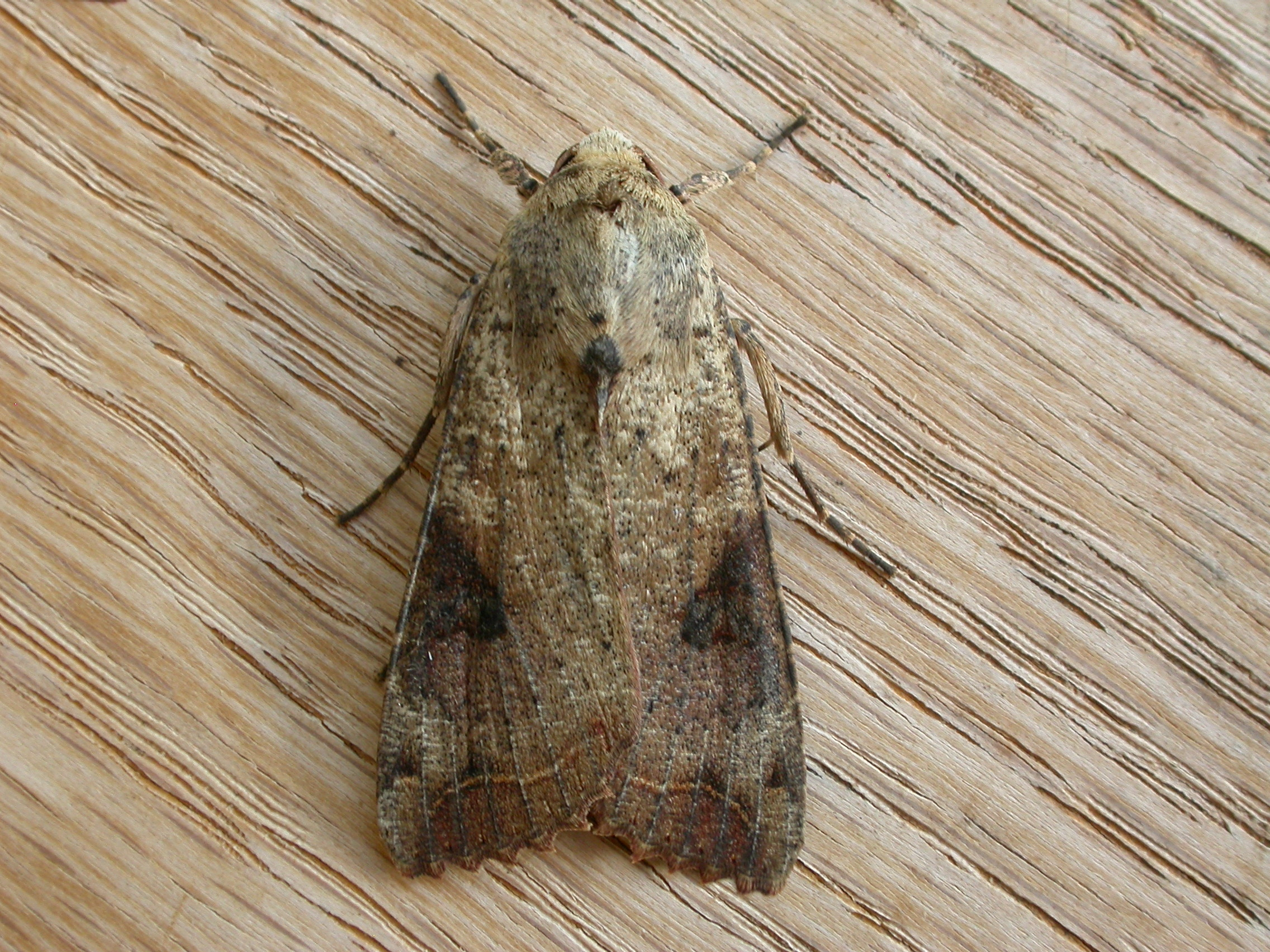

The wingspan is about 60 mm. Antennae of male minutely ciliated. Forewings with strongly toothed cilia. Body pale greyish brown and abdomen fuscous. Forewings often suffused with red brown and irrorated (sprinkled) with dark brown. There is an antemedial waved indistinct line which is often obsolete. Orbicular also obsolete, whereas reniform almost obsolete, ochreous or fuscous, sometimes on a dark patch. There are traces of a postmedial curved series of black specks. A submarginal doubly curved ochreous line can be seen, accompany with a marginal black specks series as well. Hindwings are fuscous with whitish cilia.

Larva dull violet brown with a few fine dorsal hairs. A few scattered grey dots and a sub-lateral pale olivaceous band from fourth somite. Head and legs violet grey. Head small and anal somite conical. Pupa dark red.

== Ecology ==
It is an international fruit pest, particularly for Musa acuminata, a species of banana. Larvae have also been recorded on other plants, including Dioscorea species, Diplocyclos palmatus, Toona australis, Eucalyptus, Portulaca oleracea, Phytolacca octandra Theobroma cacao, Coffea arabica, and Physalis ixocarpa.
