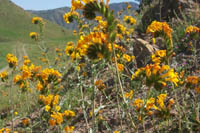
- Amsinckia vernicosa var. furcata

Scientific classification
- Kingdom: Plantae
- Clade: Tracheophytes
- Clade: Angiosperms
- Clade: Eudicots
- Clade: Asterids
- Order: Boraginales
- Family: Boraginaceae
- Genus: Amsinckia
- Species: A. vernicosa

Binomial name
- Amsinckia vernicosa Hook. & Arn.

= Amsinckia vernicosa =

Species of flowering plant

Amsinckia vernicosa is a species of fiddleneck known by the common name green fiddleneck.

It is endemic to California, where it is an uncommon member of mountain, desert, and valley habitat in several regions.

== Description ==
Amsinckia vernicosa is a hairy annual herb somewhat similar to other fiddlenecks, but waxy in texture and pinkish in color along the lower stem.

The coiled inflorescence holds yellow or orange tubular flowers up to 2 centimeters long and 1.5 wide at the corolla.
