= D. californica =

D. californica may refer to:

- Danthonia californica, the California oatgrass, a grass species native to two separate regions of the Americas, western North America from California to Saskatchewan and Chile
- Darlingtonia californica, the California pitcher plant, cobra lily or cobra plant, a carnivorous plant species native to Northern California and Oregon
- Descurainia californica, the Sierra tansymustard, a flowering plant species native from California to Wyoming
- Draba californica, the California draba, a flowering plant species found in California and Nevada

== Synonyms ==
- Dryobota californica, a synonym for Egira hiemalis, a moth species found from British Columbia south to California

== See also ==
- List of Latin and Greek words commonly used in systematic names#C
