= Descurainia torulosa =

Conservation status
- Imperiled (NatureServe)

Scientific classification
- Kingdom: Plantae
- Clade: Tracheophytes
- Clade: Angiosperms
- Clade: Eudicots
- Clade: Rosids
- Order: Brassicales
- Family: Brassicaceae
- Genus: Descurainia
- Species: D. torulosa

Binomial name
- Descurainia torulosa Rollins

Species of flowering plant

Descurainia torulosa is a species of flowering plant in the family Brassicaceae known by the common names Wyoming tansymustard and Wind River tansymustard. It is endemic to Wyoming in the United States, where it is found in the Absaroka Range and some buttes in the Great Divide Basin.

This perennial or sometimes annual herb has hairy stems up to 15 centimeters long. The leaves are pinnate, divided into several lobes. The inflorescence is a raceme of flowers with yellowish sepals and four yellow petals. The fruit is a narrow silique which is torulose, or constricted between the seeds. Blooming occurs in June and July.

This plant grows on steep slopes, talus, and the sandy areas at the bases of cliffs.
