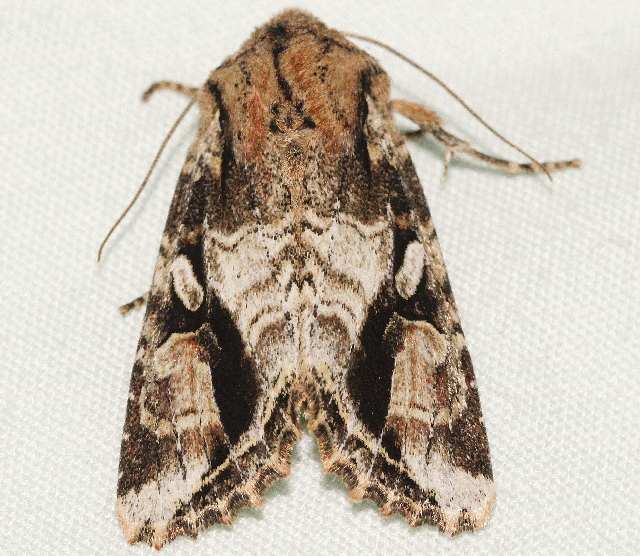

Scientific classification
- Domain: Eukaryota
- Kingdom: Animalia
- Phylum: Arthropoda
- Class: Insecta
- Order: Lepidoptera
- Superfamily: Noctuoidea
- Family: Noctuidae
- Tribe: Orthosiini
- Genus: Egira
- Species: E. rubrica

Binomial name
- Egira rubrica (Harvey, 1878)

= Egira rubrica =

Species of moth

Egira rubrica is a species of cutworm or dart moth in the family Noctuidae. It is found in North America.

The MONA or Hodges number for Egira rubrica is 10514.

== Subspecies ==
These two subspecies belong to the species Egira rubrica:

- Egira rubrica rubrica
- Egira rubrica rubricoides Barnes & Benjamin, 1924
