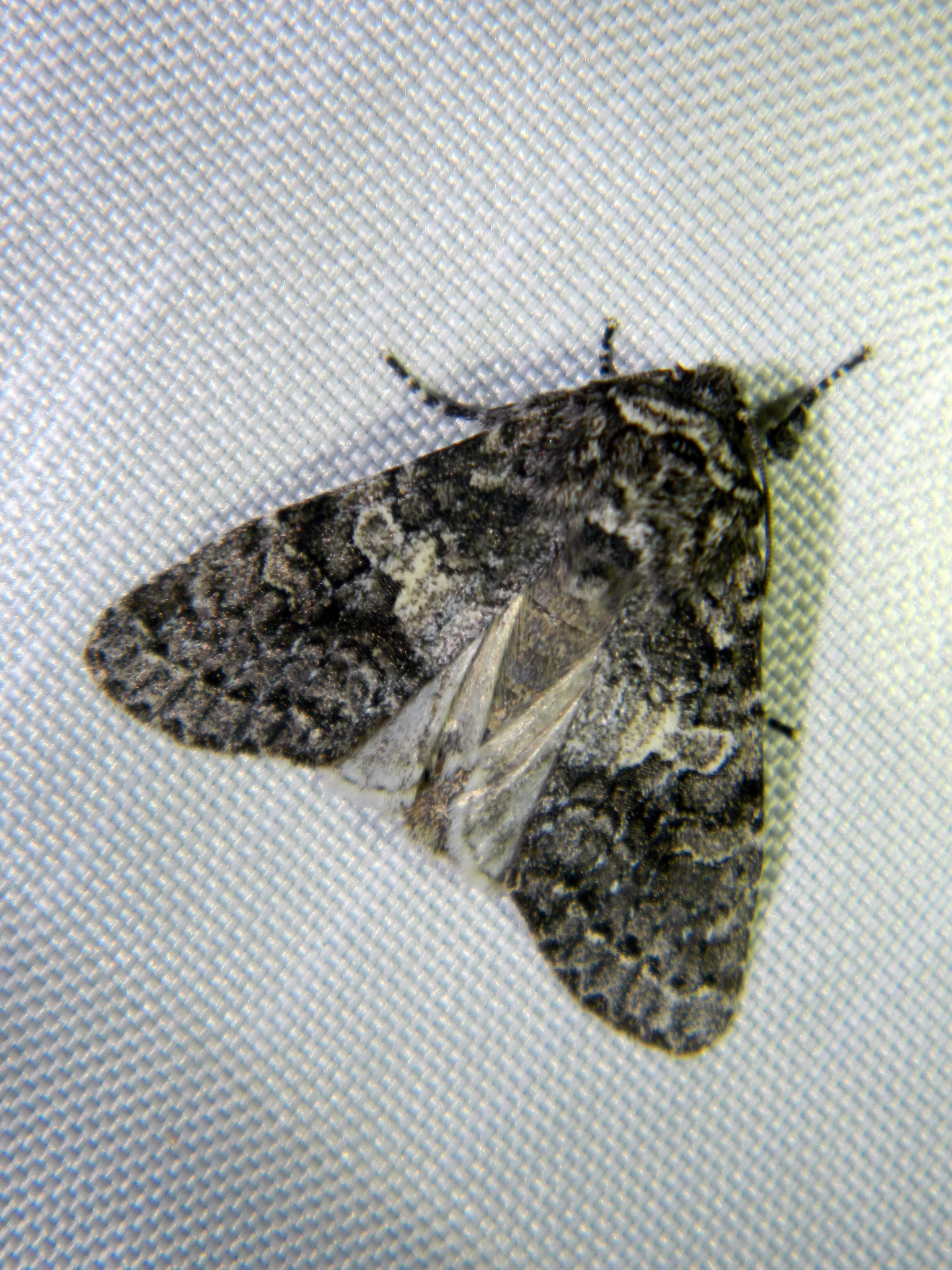

Scientific classification
- Kingdom: Animalia
- Phylum: Arthropoda
- Clade: Pancrustacea
- Class: Insecta
- Order: Lepidoptera
- Superfamily: Noctuoidea
- Family: Noctuidae
- Genus: Egira
- Species: E. dolosa

Binomial name
- Egira dolosa (Grote, 1880)

= Egira dolosa =

Species of moth

Egira dolosa is a moth in the family Noctuidae described by Augustus Radcliffe Grote in 1880. It is found in North America.
