= Egira tibori =

Scientific classification
- Domain: Eukaryota
- Kingdom: Animalia
- Phylum: Arthropoda
- Class: Insecta
- Order: Lepidoptera
- Superfamily: Noctuoidea
- Family: Noctuidae
- Genus: Egira
- Species: E. tibori

Binomial name
- Egira tibori Hreblay, 1994

Species of moth

Egira tibori is a species of moth of the family Noctuidae. It is endemic to the eastern part of the Mediterranean, the Balkans, Turkey, Israel, Lebanon and Jordan.

Adults are on wing from February to May. There is one generation per year.

The larvae probably feed on various herbaceous plants and trees.
