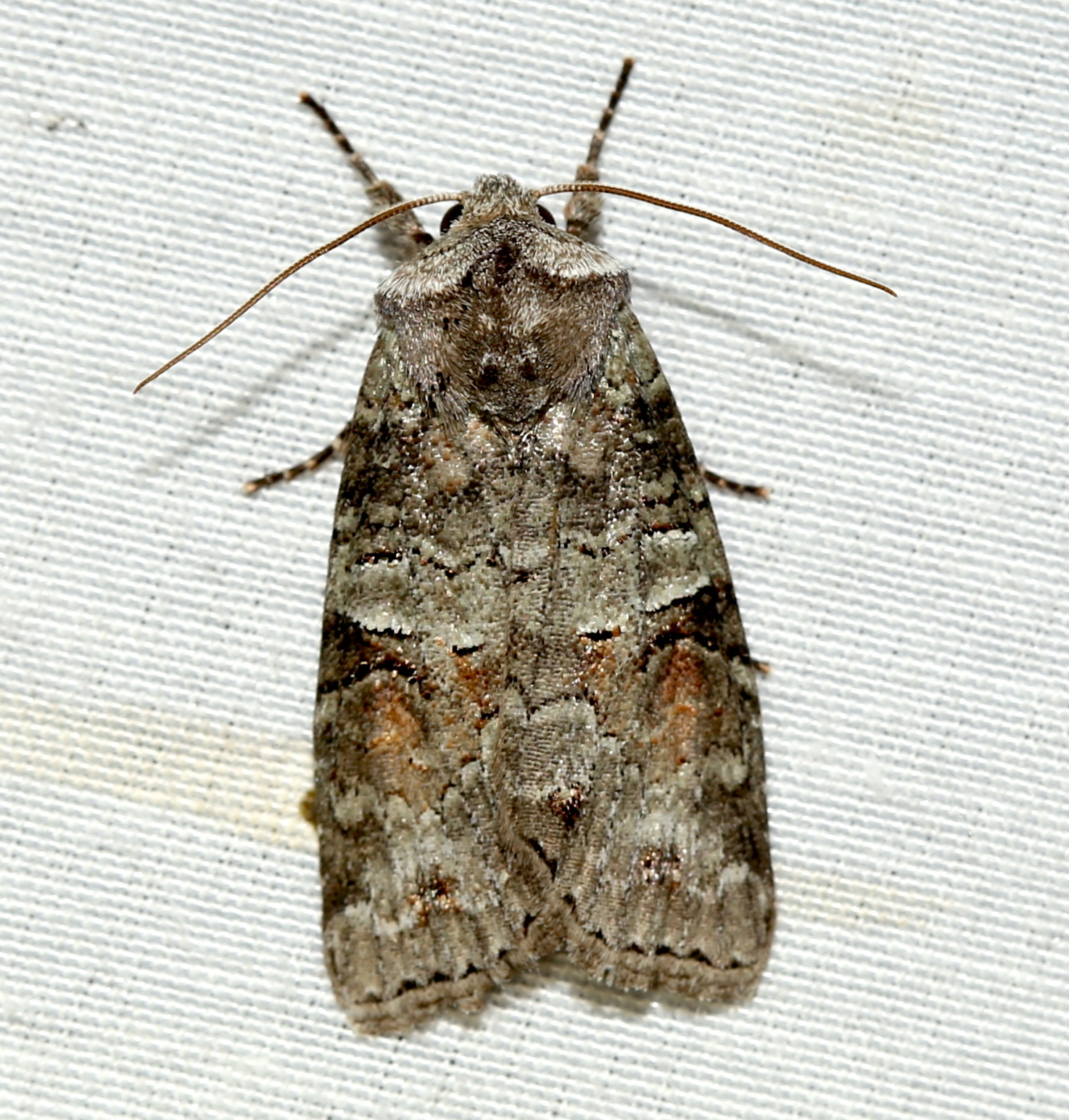

Scientific classification
- Kingdom: Animalia
- Phylum: Arthropoda
- Class: Insecta
- Order: Lepidoptera
- Superfamily: Noctuoidea
- Family: Noctuidae
- Tribe: Orthosiini
- Genus: Egira
- Species: E. alternans

Binomial name
- Egira alternans (Walker, 1857)

= Egira alternans =

Species of moth

Egira alternans, the alternate woodling, is a species of cutworm or dart moth in the family Noctuidae. It is found in North America.

The MONA or Hodges number for Egira alternans is 10517.
