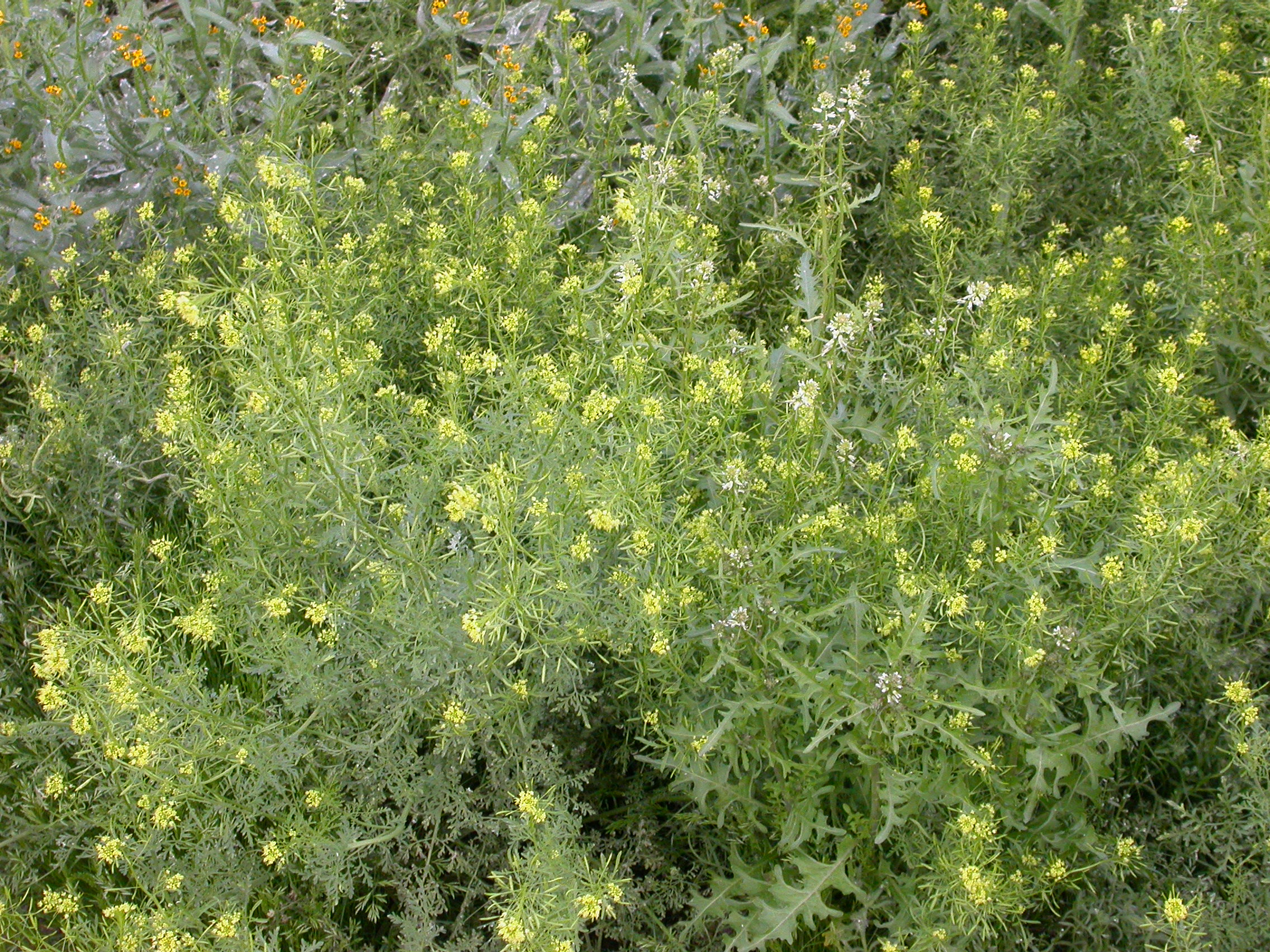

Conservation status
- Secure (NatureServe)

Scientific classification
- Kingdom: Plantae
- Clade: Tracheophytes
- Clade: Angiosperms
- Clade: Eudicots
- Clade: Rosids
- Order: Brassicales
- Family: Brassicaceae
- Genus: Descurainia
- Species: D. pinnata

Binomial name
- Descurainia pinnata (Walt.) Britt.

= Descurainia pinnata =

Species of flowering plant

Descurainia pinnata is a species of flowering plant in the family Brassicaceae known by the common names southeastern tansymustard and western tansymustard. It is native to North America, where it is widespread and found in varied habitats. It is especially successful in deserts and dry fields. It is a hardy plant which easily becomes weedy, and can spring up in disturbed, barren sites with bad soil.

== Description ==
This is a hairy, heavily branched, mustardlike annual which is quite variable in appearance. There are several subspecies which vary from each other and individuals within a subspecies may look different depending on the climate they endure. This may be a clumping thicket or a tall, erect mustard. The plants grow 2-3 ft tall. It has highly lobed or divided leaves with pointed, toothed lobes or leaflets. At the tips of the stem branches are tiny yellow flowers that bloom in the spring. The fruit is a silique one half to two centimeters long upon a threadlike pedicel. This plant reproduces only from seed.

== Ecology ==
This tansymustard is toxic to grazing animals in large quantities due to nitrates and thiocyanates; however, it is nutritious in smaller amounts. Cattle that consume the plant experience numbing of the tongue, begin to hit their heads against hard objects, and can even lose vision. The plant is bitter and the seeds are said to taste somewhat like black mustard and were utilized as food by Native American peoples such as the Navajo. In Korea, it has been found to have been used historically as medicine since the 1950s when the plant was introduced.
