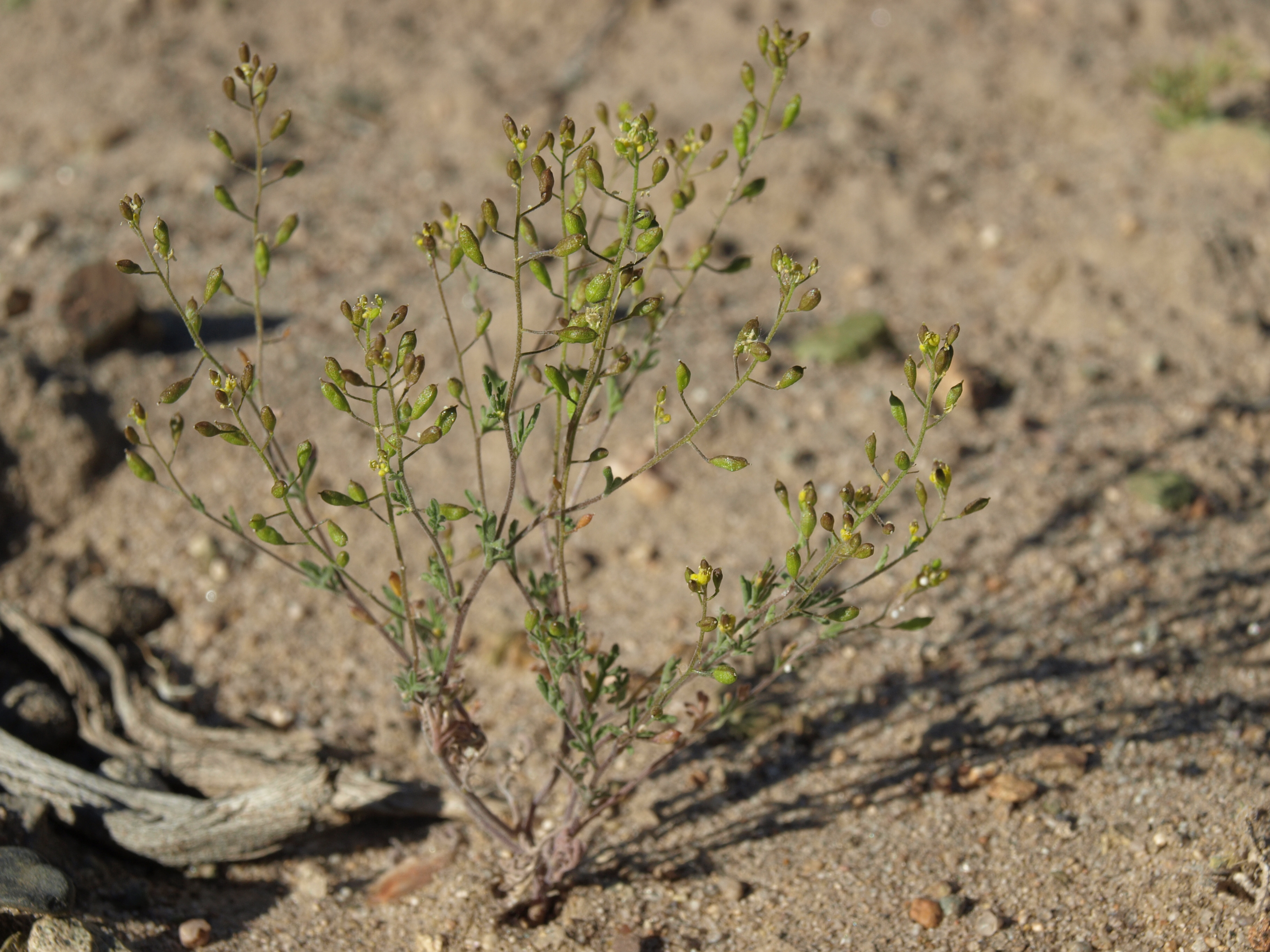

Scientific classification
- Kingdom: Plantae
- Clade: Embryophytes
- Clade: Tracheophytes
- Clade: Spermatophytes
- Clade: Angiosperms
- Clade: Eudicots
- Clade: Rosids
- Order: Brassicales
- Family: Brassicaceae
- Genus: Descurainia
- Species: D. paradisa

Binomial name
- Descurainia paradisa (A.Nelson & P.B.Kenn.) O.E.Schulz

Synonyms
- Descurainia paradisa subsp. nevadensis Rollins; Descurainia paradisa var. nevadensis (Rollins) N.H. Holmgren; Descurainia pinnata subsp. paradisa (A. Nelson & P.B. Kenn.) Detling; Descurainia pinnata var. paradisa (A. Nelson & P.B. Kenn.) M. Peck; Sisymbrium paradisum (A. Nelson & P.B. Kenn.) A. Nelson & J.F. Macbr.; Sophia paradisa A. Nelson & P.B. Kenn.

= Descurainia paradisa =

Species of flowering plant

Descurainia paradisa is a plant species native to eastern and northern California, southeastern Oregon, Box Elder County in northwestern Utah, and most of Nevada. It grows in shrub communities at elevations of 3,300–7,500 feet (1,000–2,300 m).

Descurainia paradisa is an annual herb up to 14 inches (35 cm) tall. Stems are often purple, branching at the base and sometimes above ground. Leaves are up to 1.2 inches (3 cm) long, pinnately lobed. Flowers are pale yellow, borne in a raceme. Fruits are egg-shaped, up to 0.20 inches (5 mm) long.
