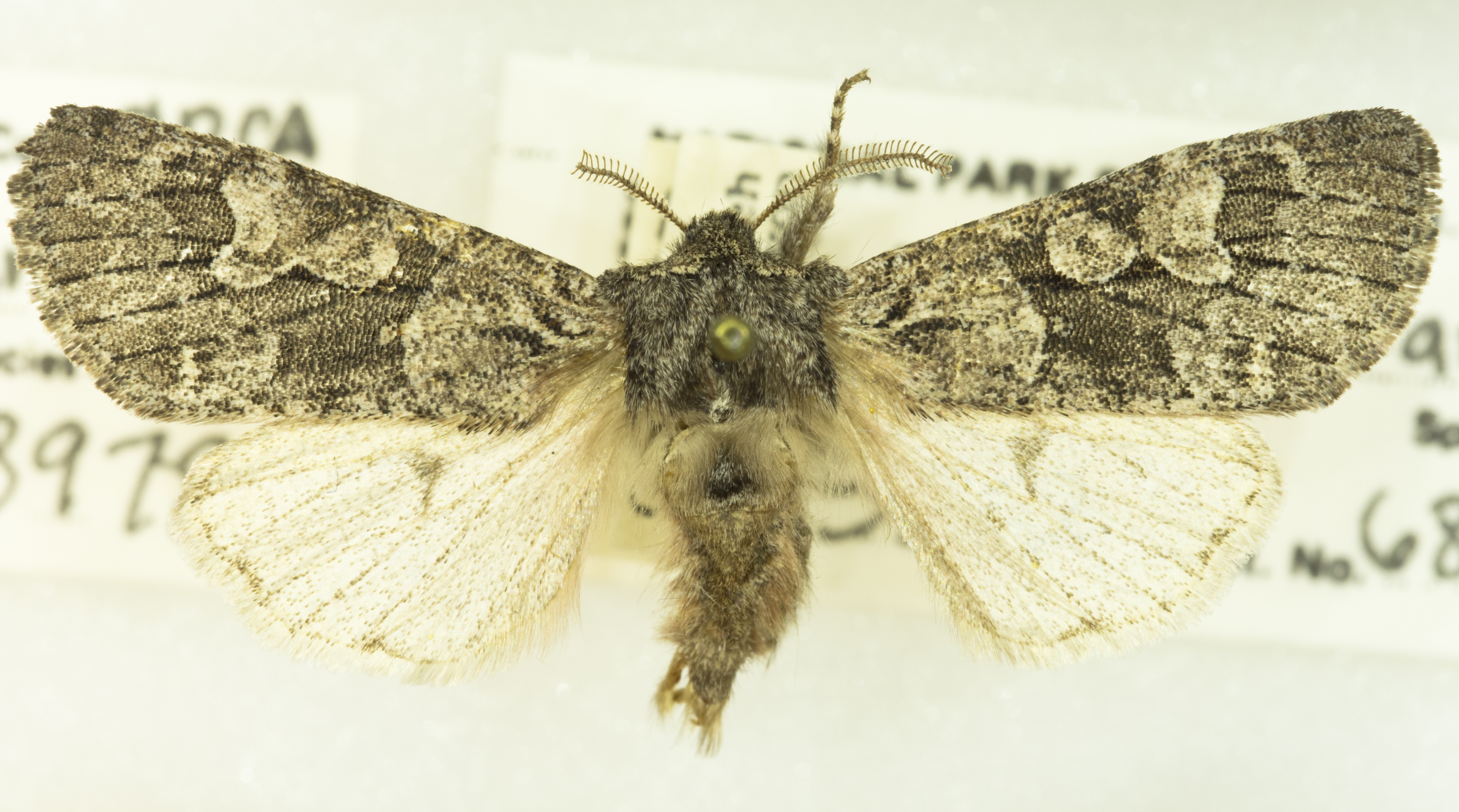

Scientific classification
- Domain: Eukaryota
- Kingdom: Animalia
- Phylum: Arthropoda
- Class: Insecta
- Order: Lepidoptera
- Superfamily: Noctuoidea
- Family: Noctuidae
- Tribe: Orthosiini
- Genus: Egira
- Species: E. variabilis

Binomial name
- Egira variabilis (Smith, 1891)

= Egira variabilis =

Species of moth

Egira variabilis is a species of cutworm or dart moth in the family Noctuidae. It is found in North America.

The MONA or Hodges number for Egira variabilis is 10504.
