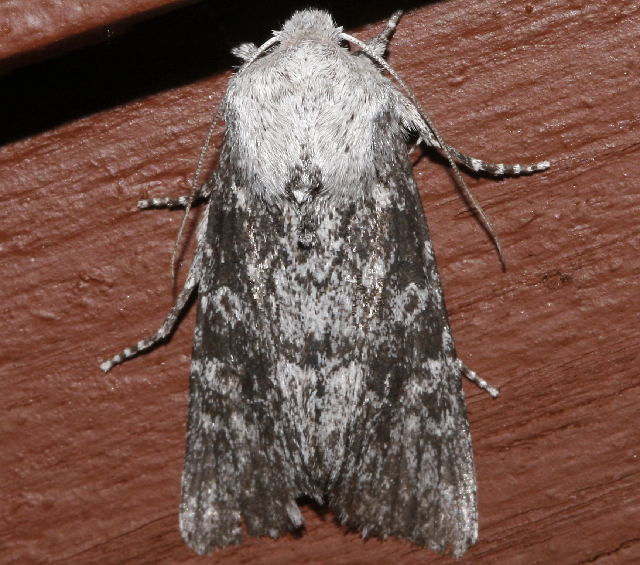

Scientific classification
- Kingdom: Animalia
- Phylum: Arthropoda
- Clade: Pancrustacea
- Class: Insecta
- Order: Lepidoptera
- Superfamily: Noctuoidea
- Family: Noctuidae
- Genus: Egira
- Species: E. curialis

Binomial name
- Egira curialis (Grote, 1873)

Synonyms
- Egira candida (Smith, 1894)

= Egira curialis =

Species of moth

Egira curialis is a species of cutworm or dart moth in the family Noctuidae. It is found in North America.
