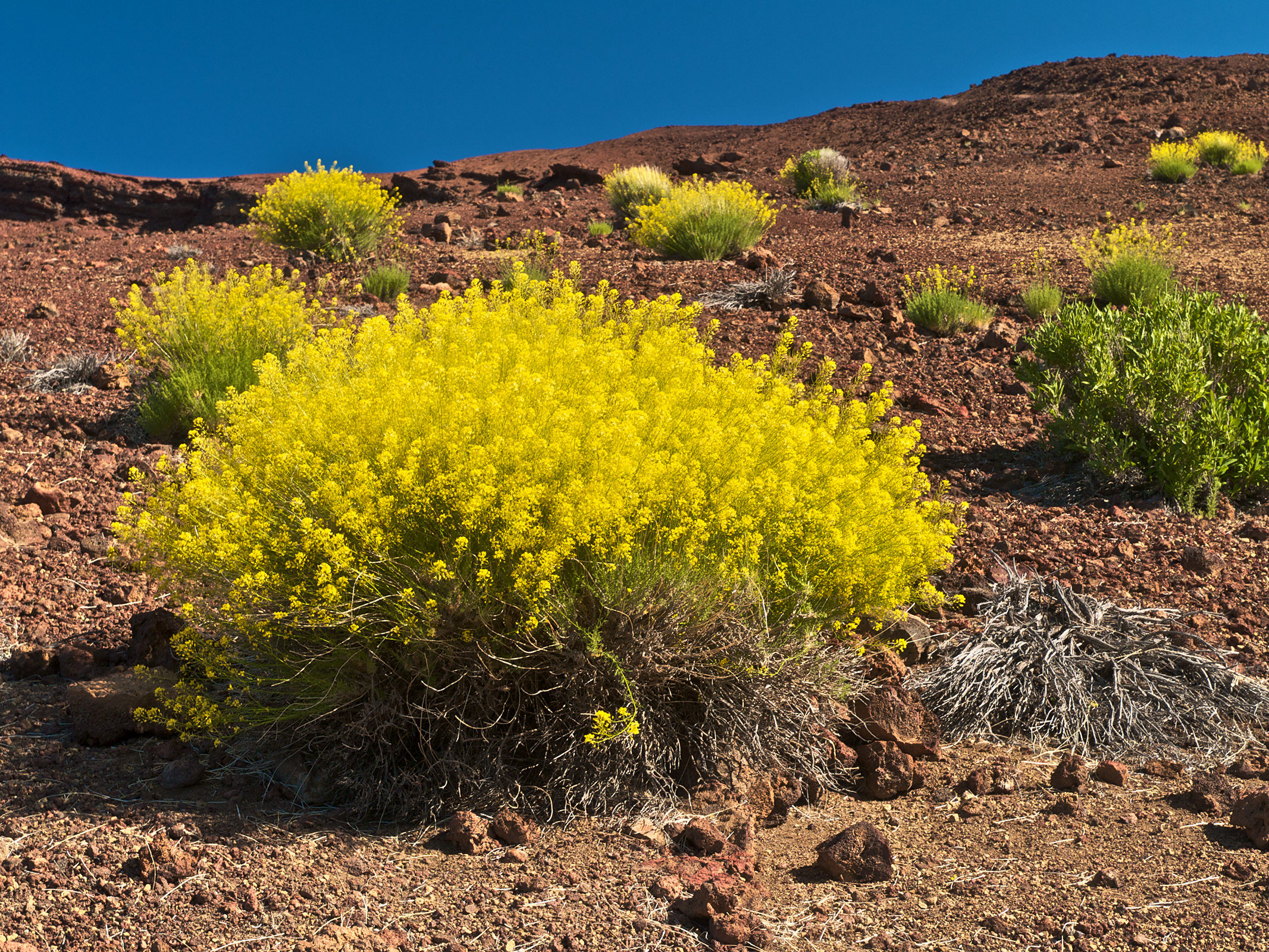

Scientific classification
- Kingdom: Plantae
- Clade: Embryophytes
- Clade: Tracheophytes
- Clade: Angiosperms
- Clade: Eudicots
- Clade: Rosids
- Order: Brassicales
- Family: Brassicaceae
- Genus: Descurainia
- Species: D. bourgaeana

Binomial name
- Descurainia bourgaeana (E.Fourn.) Webb ex O.E.Schulz

Synonyms
- Hesperis bourgaeana (E.Fourn.) Kuntze; Sisymbrium bourgaeanum E.Fourn.

= Descurainia bourgaeana =

Species of flowering plant in the cabbage family

Descurainia bourgaeana (hierba pajonera or flixweed) is a species of flowering plant in the family Brassicaceae endemic to Las Cañadas del Teide on Tenerife and La Palma in the Canary Islands.

Descurainia bourgaeana grows as shrubby clumps about 1 metre (3 ft 3 in) in height with yellow flowers.

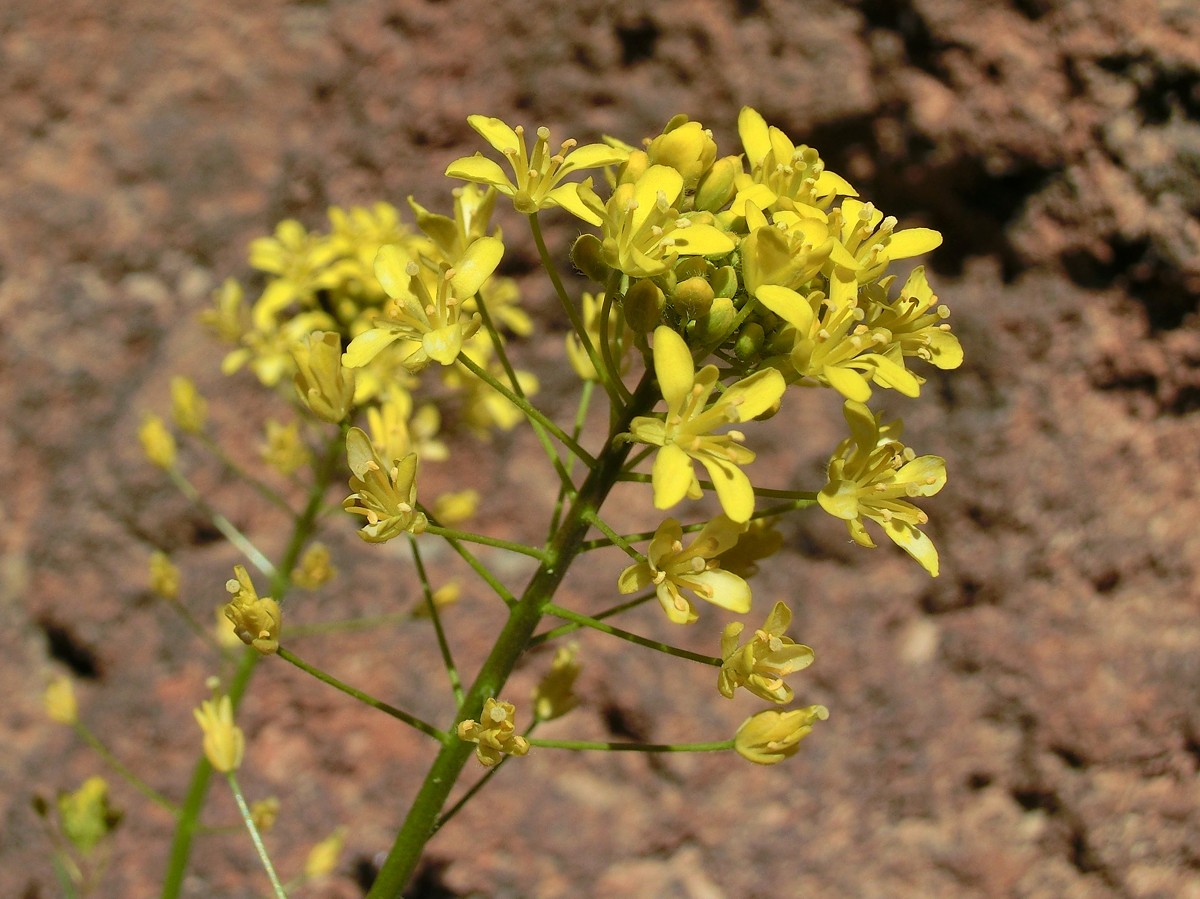
Desurainia bourgaeana in close up
