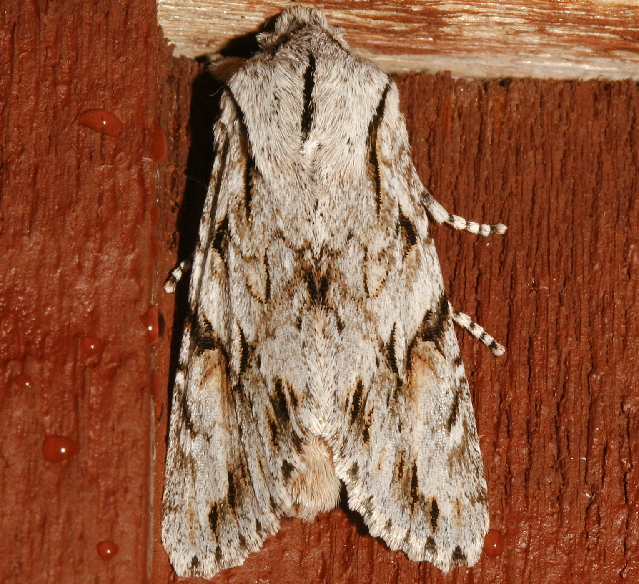

Scientific classification
- Domain: Eukaryota
- Kingdom: Animalia
- Phylum: Arthropoda
- Class: Insecta
- Order: Lepidoptera
- Superfamily: Noctuoidea
- Family: Noctuidae
- Tribe: Orthosiini
- Genus: Egira
- Species: E. crucialis

Binomial name
- Egira crucialis (Harvey, 1875)

= Egira crucialis =

Species of moth

Egira crucialis is a species of cutworm or dart moth in the family Noctuidae. It is found in North America.

The MONA or Hodges number for Egira crucialis is 10508.
