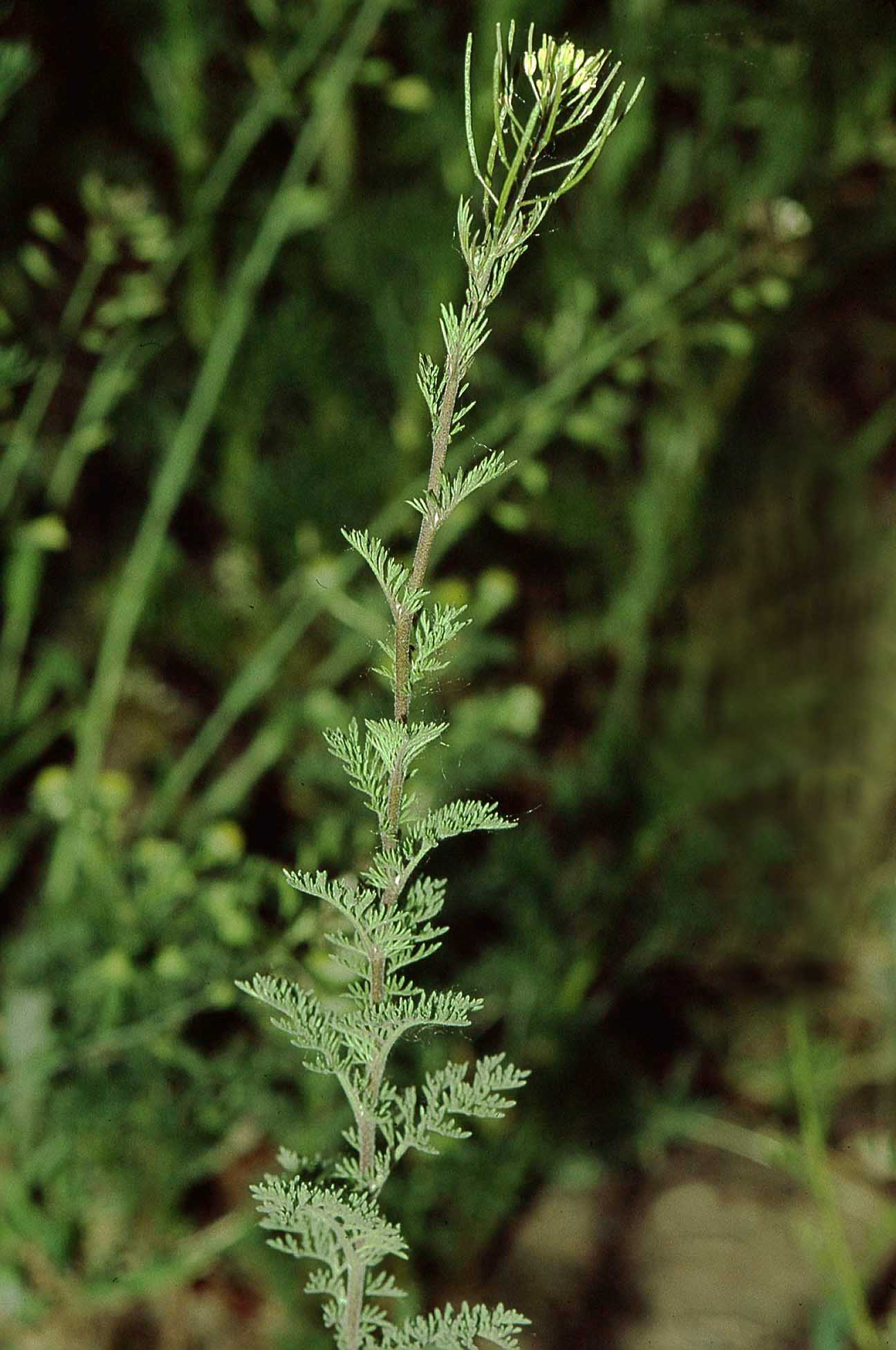

Scientific classification
- Kingdom: Plantae
- Clade: Embryophytes
- Clade: Tracheophytes
- Clade: Spermatophytes
- Clade: Angiosperms
- Clade: Eudicots
- Clade: Rosids
- Order: Brassicales
- Family: Brassicaceae
- Genus: Descurainia
- Species: D. sophia

Binomial name
- Descurainia sophia (L.) Webb ex Prantl

Synonyms
- Sisymbrium sophia L.

= Descurainia sophia =

Species of flowering plant

Descurainia sophia is a species of flowering plant in the cabbage family Brassicaceae. Common names include flixweed, herb-Sophia and tansy mustard. It is an annual plant that reproduces by seeds. It is a dominant weed in dark brown prairie and black prairie soils of southern Alberta. Its stem is erect, branched, and 4–30 in (10–76 cm) high. It was once given to patients with dysentery and called by ancient herbalists Sophia Chirurgorum, "The Wisdom of Surgeons". It is the type species of the genus Descurainia (named for French botanist and herbalist François Descurain (1658–1749)) and of the rejected genus Sophia Adans.

== Description ==
Descurainia sophia is an annual plant. It will sprout and grow in the fall and spends winter as a rosette. Growth resumes in the spring and plants flower by late spring.

== Culinary use ==
In Iran, the seeds are called khak-e shir (khakshir), and khak-e shir drinks are traditionally favored as thirst quencher during hot summer days. Khakshir is also considered a medicinal substance in traditional Iranian medicine, consumed in varying combinations with other herbs and substances to gain effects ranging from antidiuretic to aphrodisiac.

China has a tradition of eating this plant, and its eating method is recorded in the Jiuhuang Bencao (Book of Famine Relief Herbals).

== Cultural ==
In German, it is called the Sophienkraut and associated with Saint Sophia of Rome, who was invoked against late frosts.
