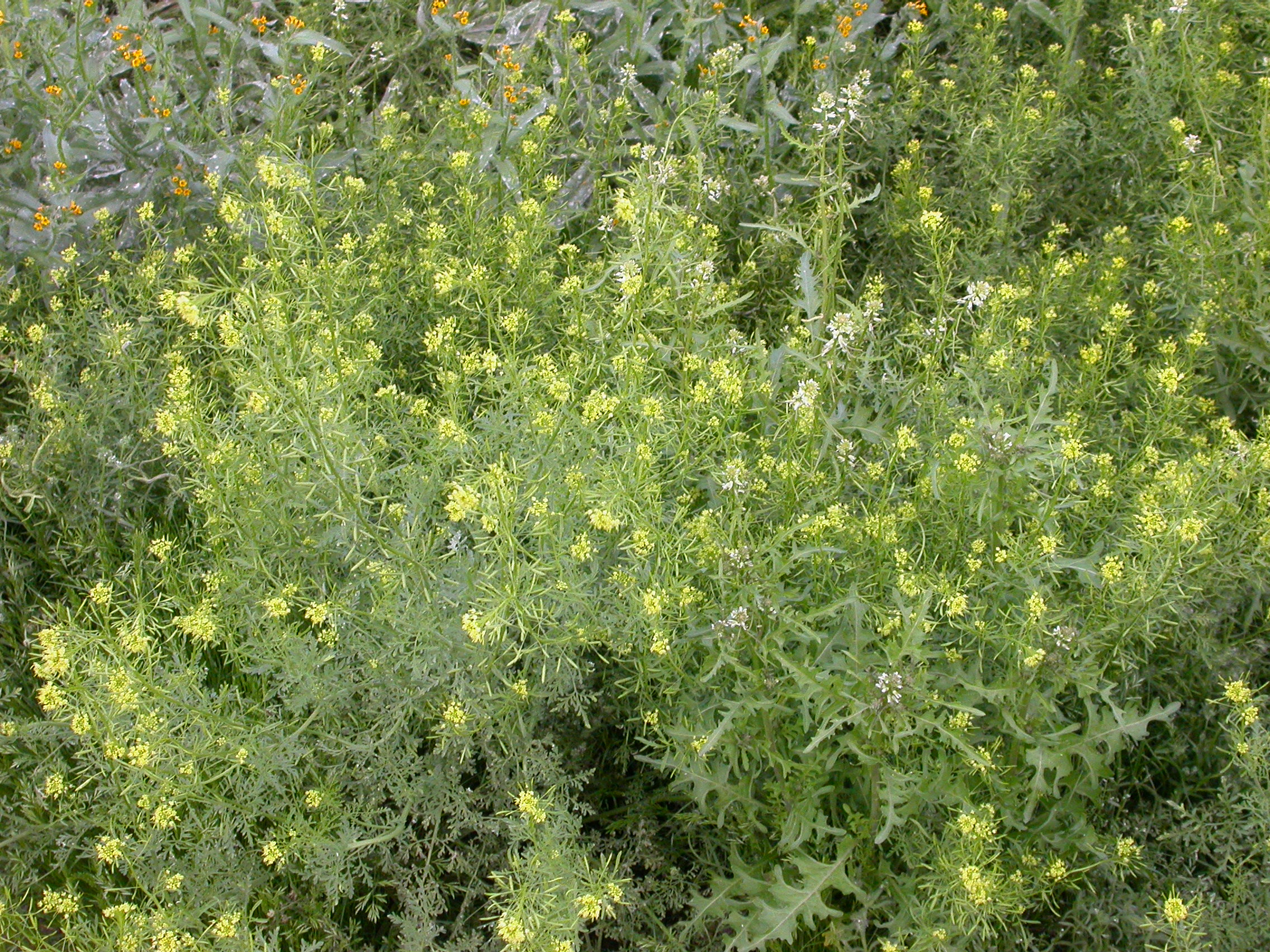
- Descurainia pinnata

Scientific classification
- Kingdom: Plantae
- Clade: Embryophytes
- Clade: Tracheophytes
- Clade: Angiosperms
- Clade: Eudicots
- Clade: Rosids
- Order: Brassicales
- Family: Brassicaceae
- Genus: Descurainia; Webb & Berthel.

Species
- 47, see text

Synonyms
- Discurea Schur; Hugueninia Rchb.; Leptobasis Dulac; Robeschia Hochst. ex E.Fourn.; Sophia Adans.

= Descurainia =

Genus of flowering plants in the cabbage family

Descurainia is a genus of plants in the family Brassicaceae which are known commonly as the tansymustards. The genus name commemorates French botanist and herbalist François Descurain (1658–1749). The plants are similar in appearance to other mustards, sending up long erect stems and bearing small yellow or whitish flowers. Many species are noxious weeds. Some species are toxic to livestock and become a nuisance when they grow in grazing fields. Plants of this genus are found worldwide in temperate regions. Descurainia sophia, (flixweed or herb sophia), is the type species of Descurainia.

== Species ==
47 species are accepted.

- Descurainia adenophora (Wooton & Standl.) O.E.Schulz
- Descurainia adpressa Boelcke
- Descurainia altoandina Romanczuk
- Descurainia antarctica – Tierra del Fuego tansymustard
- Descurainia argentea O.E.Schulz
- Descurainia artemisioides Svent.
- Descurainia athrocarpa (A.Gray) O.E.Schulz
- Descurainia bourgaeana (E.Fourn.) Webb ex O.E.Schulz
- Descurainia brevifructa Boelcke ex J.B.Martínez
- Descurainia brevisiliqua (Detling) Al-Shehbaz & Goodson
- Descurainia browniae R.P.McNeill
- Descurainia californica (A.Gray) O.E.Schulz – Sierra tansymustard
- Descurainia canoensis Al-Shehbaz
- Descurainia cleefii Al-Shehbaz
- Descurainia cumingiana (Fisch. & C.A.Mey.) Prantl
- Descurainia depressa (Phil.) Reiche
- Descurainia erodiifolia (Phil.) Reiche
- Descurainia gilva Svent.
- Descurainia gonzalezii Svent.
- Descurainia hartwegiana (E.Fourn.) Britton
- Descurainia heterotricha Speg.
- Descurainia impatiens (Cham. & Schltdl.) O.E.Schulz
- Descurainia incana (Bernh. ex Fisch. & C.A.Mey.) Dorn – mountain tansymustard
- Descurainia incisa (Engelm.) Britton
- Descurainia kenheilii Al-Shehbaz
- Descurainia kochii (F.Petri) O.E.Schulz
- Descurainia lasisiliqua O.E.Schulz
- Descurainia lemsii Bramwell
- Descurainia longepedicellata (E.Fourn.) O.E.Schulz
- Descurainia millefolia (Jacq.) Webb & Berthel.
- Descurainia myriophylla (Willd.) R.E.Fr.
- Descurainia nana Romanczuk
- Descurainia nelsonii (Rydb.) Al-Shehbaz & Goodson
- Descurainia nuttallii (Colla) O.E.Schulz
- Descurainia obtusa (Greene) O.E.Schulz – blunt tansymustard
- Descurainia paradisa (A.Nelson & P.B.Kenn.) O.E.Schulz – paradise tansymustard
- Descurainia pimpinellifolia (Barnéoud) O.E.Schulz
- Descurainia pinnata (Walter) Britton – western tansymustard
- Descurainia preauxiana (Webb) Webb ex O.E.Schulz
- Descurainia sophia (L.) Webb ex Prantl – flixweed, herb-Sophia or tansy
- Descurainia sophioides (Fisch. ex Hook.) O.E.Schulz – northern tansymustard
- Descurainia streptocarpa (E.Fourn.) O.E.Schulz
- Descurainia stricta (Phil.) Reiche
- Descurainia tanacetifolia (L.) Prantl
- Descurainia torulosa Rollins – Wind River tansymustard
- Descurainia tugayi Yıld.
- Descurainia virletii (E.Fourn.) O.E.Schulz
