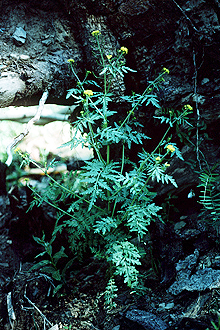
- subsp. incana

Conservation status
- Secure (NatureServe)

Scientific classification
- Kingdom: Plantae
- Clade: Tracheophytes
- Clade: Angiosperms
- Clade: Eudicots
- Clade: Rosids
- Order: Brassicales
- Family: Brassicaceae
- Genus: Descurainia
- Species: D. incana

Binomial name
- Descurainia incana (Bernh. ex Fisch. & C.A.Mey.) Dorn

= Descurainia incana =

Species of flowering plant

Descurainia incana is a species of flowering plant in the mustard family known by the common name mountain tansymustard. It is native to much of North America, including most of Canada, the western United States, and Baja California. It is known from many types of habitat. It is a biennial herb with a slender, greenish, often hairy stem sometimes exceeding a meter tall. The leaves are narrowly to widely oval in shape, the lower ones lobed and sometimes compound, the upper generally unlobed. The mustardlike inflorescence is a series of developing fruits beneath an elongating cluster of small bright yellow flowers. The fruit is a thin, pointed silique up to 2 centimeters long.
