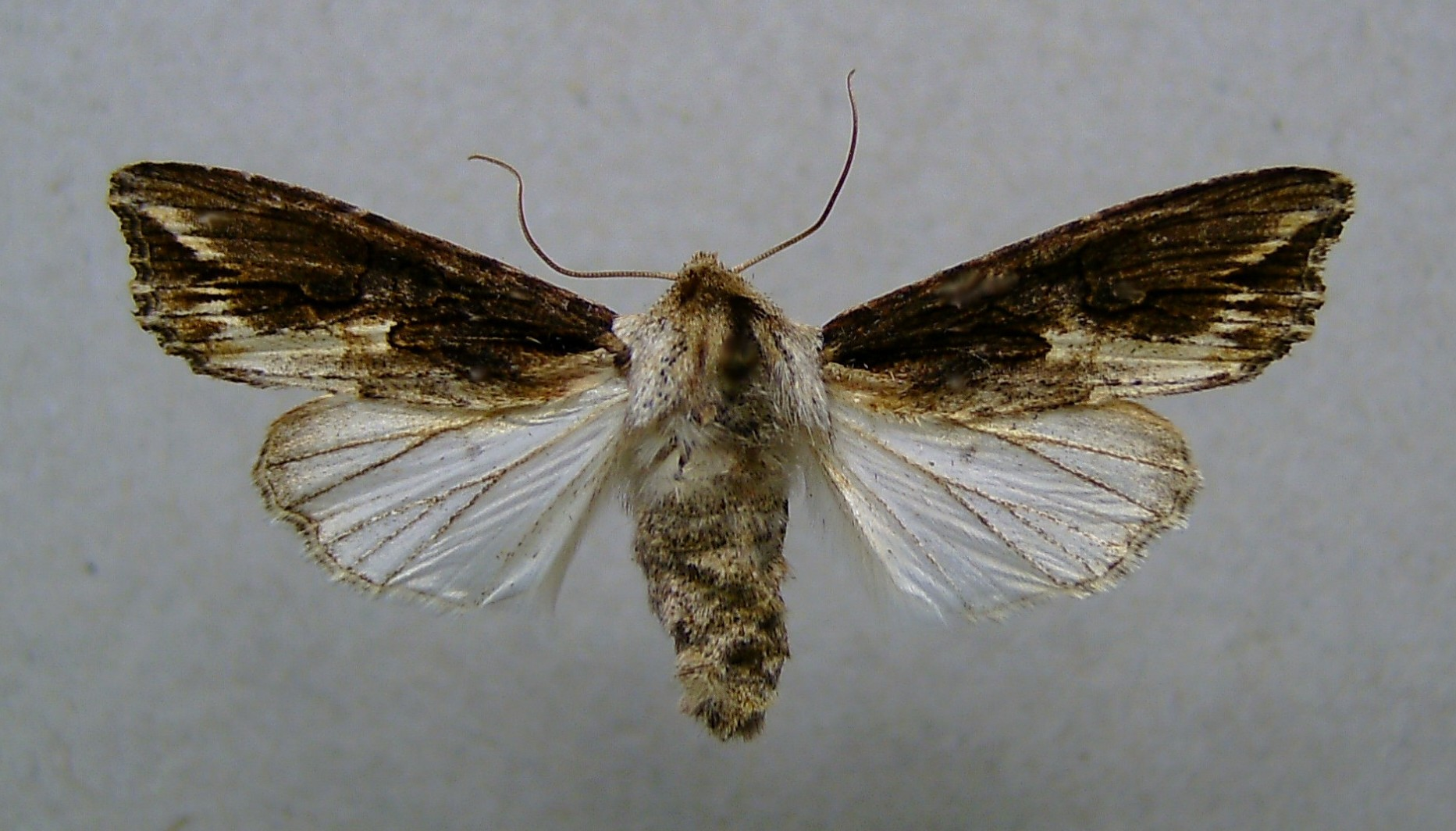

Scientific classification
- Kingdom: Animalia
- Phylum: Arthropoda
- Class: Insecta
- Order: Lepidoptera
- Superfamily: Noctuoidea
- Family: Noctuidae
- Genus: Egira
- Species: E. conspicillaris

Binomial name
- Egira conspicillaris (Linnaeus, 1758)

Synonyms
- Phalaena conspicillaris Linnaeus, 1758; Noctua melaleuca Vieweg, 1790; Phalaena leuconota Donovan, 1808

= Egira conspicillaris =

Species of moth

Egira conspicillaris, the silver cloud, is a moth of the family Noctuidae. The species was first described by Carl Linnaeus in his 1758 10th edition of Systema Naturae. It is found from the Iberian Peninsula to Russia. In the north it ranges to the Baltic Region and in the south to North Africa. It is also present in the Near East, up to the Caspian Sea.

== Description ==
The wingspan is 36–44 mm. Forewing pale lilac grey in lower half, becoming pale lilac brown in costal; markings usually much confused; inner line and median shade thick, brown; claviform stigma outlined with black; orbicular round, reniform large, both pale; outer line denoted by a row of black dashes on veins; marginal area beyond submarginal line darker; hindwing pearly white, slightly tinged with grey; the apex and veins brown; — ab. melaleuca View. has the forewing suffused with dark brown or black, except the inner area and a narrow praesubmarginal band, which are pearly grey or white; — in the ab. intermedia Tutt the outer costal half of wing is also pale brownish grey; both of these aberrations are commoner than the pale type form.

The hemispherical egg is stained with chalk white, but reddish yellow at the top pole. The surface is provided with poorly formed ribs. Young caterpillars are coloured greenish. Adult caterpillars change to brown, are brightly speckled and have a wide, bright lateral stripe. The pupa has a reddish-brown hue as well as a blunt cremaster with two short tips and two curved thorns.

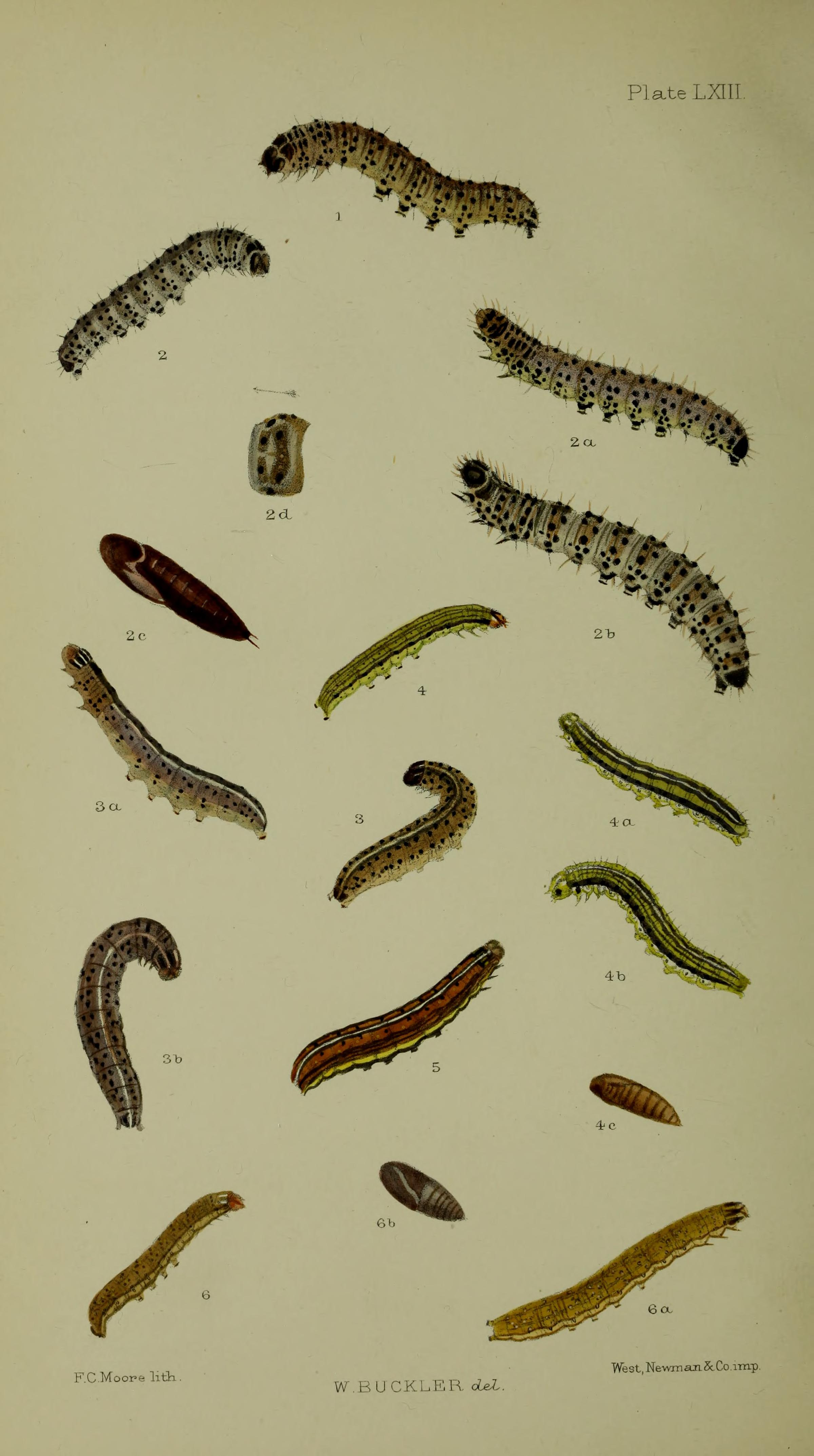
Fig 6 larva before last moult, 6a larva after last moult, 6b pupa

== Biology ==
Adults are on wing from April to May in one generation per year.

The larvae feed on Genista tinctoria, Cytisus scoparius and Clematis vitalba. Other recorded food plants include Prunus spinosa, Prunus domestica, Fraxinus and Rumex species.
