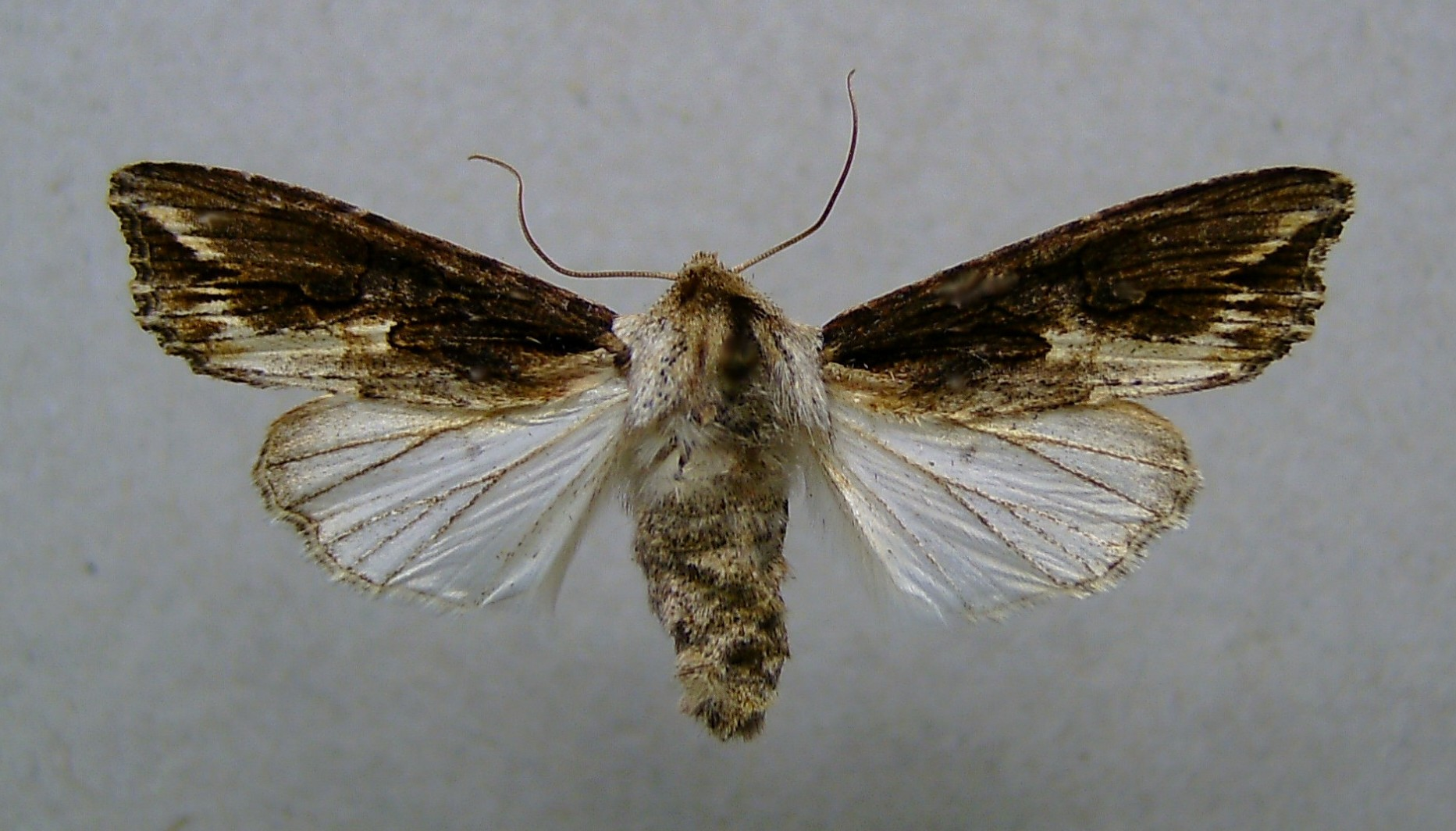
- Egira conspicillaris

Scientific classification
- Kingdom: Animalia
- Phylum: Arthropoda
- Clade: Pancrustacea
- Class: Insecta
- Order: Lepidoptera
- Superfamily: Noctuoidea
- Family: Noctuidae
- Tribe: Orthosiini
- Genus: Egira; Duponchel, 1845

= Egira (moth) =

Genus of moths

Egira is a moth genus in the family Noctuidae. This genus has several species, including Egira crucialis, that are on wing in winter and early spring. They are sometimes, along with members of the Orthosia genus, called early spring millers.

== Species ==
- Egira acronyctoides (Wileman, 1914)
- Egira alternans (Walker, [1857]) (syn: Egira onychina (Guenée, 1852))
- Egira ambigua Galsworthy, 1997
- Egira anatolica (Hering, 1933)
- Egira baueri (Buckett, 1967, [1968])
- Egira cognata (Smith, 1894)
- Egira conspicillaris (Linnaeus, 1758)
- Egira contaminata (Chang, 1991)
- Egira crucialis (Harvey, 1875)
- Egira curialis (Grote, 1873) (syn: Egira candida (Smith, 1894))
- Egira dolosa (Grote, 1880)
- Egira draudti (Hacker, 1993)
- Egira fatima Hreblay, 1994
- Egira februalis (Barnes & McDunnough, 1918)
- Egira hiemalis (Grote, 1874)
- Egira natalensis (Butler, 1875)
- Egira ornata Hreblay & Ronkay, 1999
- Egira papae Hreblay & Ronkay, 1999
- Egira perigraphoides Hreblay & Ronkay, 1999
- Egira perlubens (Grote, 1881)
- Egira phahompoki Hreblay & Ronkay, 1999
- Egira purpurea (Barnes & McDunnough, 1910)
- Egira rubrica (Harvey, 1878)
- Egira saxea (Leech, 1889)
- Egira servadei Berio, 1982
- Egira simplex (Walker, 1865)
- Egira subterminata (Hampson, 1905)
- Egira tibori Hreblay, 1994
- Egira vanduzeei (Barnes & Benjamin, 1926)
- Egira variabilis (Smith, 1891)
