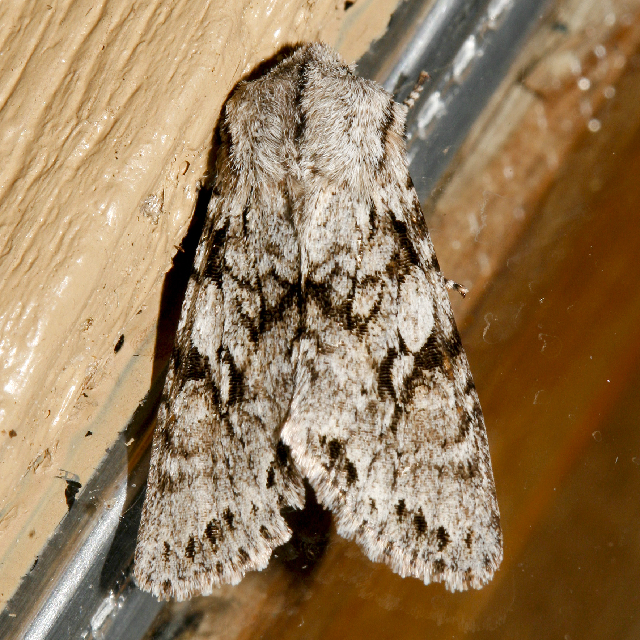

Scientific classification
- Kingdom: Animalia
- Phylum: Arthropoda
- Clade: Pancrustacea
- Class: Insecta
- Order: Lepidoptera
- Superfamily: Noctuoidea
- Family: Noctuidae
- Genus: Egira
- Species: E. simplex

Binomial name
- Egira simplex (Walker, 1865)

= Egira simplex =

Species of moth

Egira simplex is a species of cutworm or dart moth in the family Noctuidae. It is found in North America.

The MONA or Hodges number for Egira simplex is 10506.
