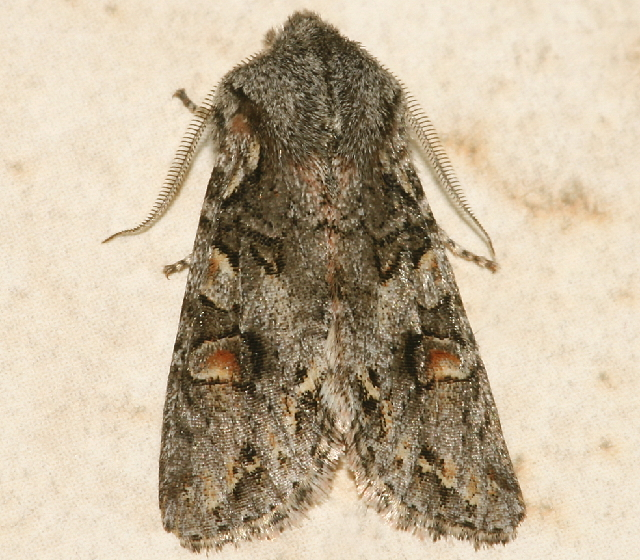

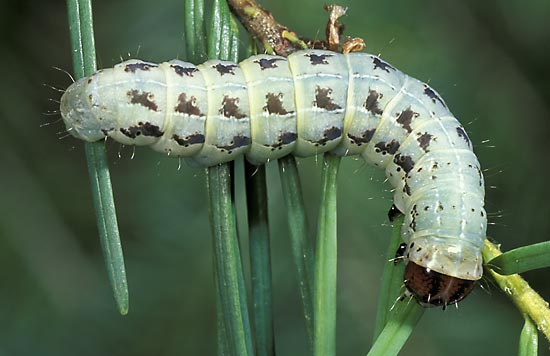
- Adult (top) and larva (bottom)

Scientific classification
- Domain: Eukaryota
- Kingdom: Animalia
- Phylum: Arthropoda
- Class: Insecta
- Order: Lepidoptera
- Superfamily: Noctuoidea
- Family: Noctuidae
- Genus: Egira
- Species: E. hiemalis

Binomial name
- Egira hiemalis Grote, 1874

Synonyms
- Xylomiges hiemalis; Dryobota californica

= Egira hiemalis =

Species of moth

Egira hiemalis is a moth of the family Noctuidae. It is found in western North America from British Columbia south to California.

The wingspan is about 36 mm. In the Pacific Northwest and California, adults are on wing in winter through early spring. In British Columbia, they are on wing later in spring.

Larvae feed on various plants depending on range. These include Pseudotsuga menziesii, Abies amabilis, Abies grandis, Tsuga heterophylla, Purshia tridentata, Corylus cornuta, and Fraxinus latifolia.
