= Draba californica =

Scientific classification
- Kingdom: Plantae
- Clade: Tracheophytes
- Clade: Angiosperms
- Clade: Eudicots
- Clade: Rosids
- Order: Brassicales
- Family: Brassicaceae
- Genus: Draba
- Species: D. californica

Binomial name
- Draba californica (Jepson) Rollins & R. A. Price

Species of flowering plant

Draba californica is a species of flowering plant in the family Brassicaceae, known as the California draba.

This is an uncommon plant found at elevations over 3,000 metres (9,800 ft) in the Inyo Mountains of California and the nearby White Mountains of California and Nevada.

Draba californica is a small perennial herb generally not exceeding 10 centimeters in height. It forms a clump of basal leaves and extends one or more erect stems, all of which is covered in a carpetlike coat of stiff, branching hairs. The stem is covered in inflorescences of many tiny white flowers and hairy fruit pods each about a centimeter long and packed with brown seeds.
