= Descurainia californica =

Conservation status
- Secure (NatureServe)

Scientific classification
- Kingdom: Plantae
- Clade: Tracheophytes
- Clade: Angiosperms
- Clade: Eudicots
- Clade: Rosids
- Order: Brassicales
- Family: Brassicaceae
- Genus: Descurainia
- Species: D. californica

Binomial name
- Descurainia californica (Gray) O.E.Schulz

Species of flowering plant

Descurainia californica is a species of flowering plant in the family Brassicaceae known by the common name Sierra tansymustard. This plant is native to western North America from California to Wyoming. It is a resident of varied habitats from mountain forest to sage scrub. This spindly mustardlike plant has a single thin stem which branches and may reach over half a meter in height. Its sparse leaves are divided into two to four pairs of dull green lobes each one to six centimeters long. The tiny bunched flowers at the tip of each stem are bright yellow. The fruit is a tiny podlike silique on a straight pedicel. Pedicels holding fruits stick out from the stem at intervals.
