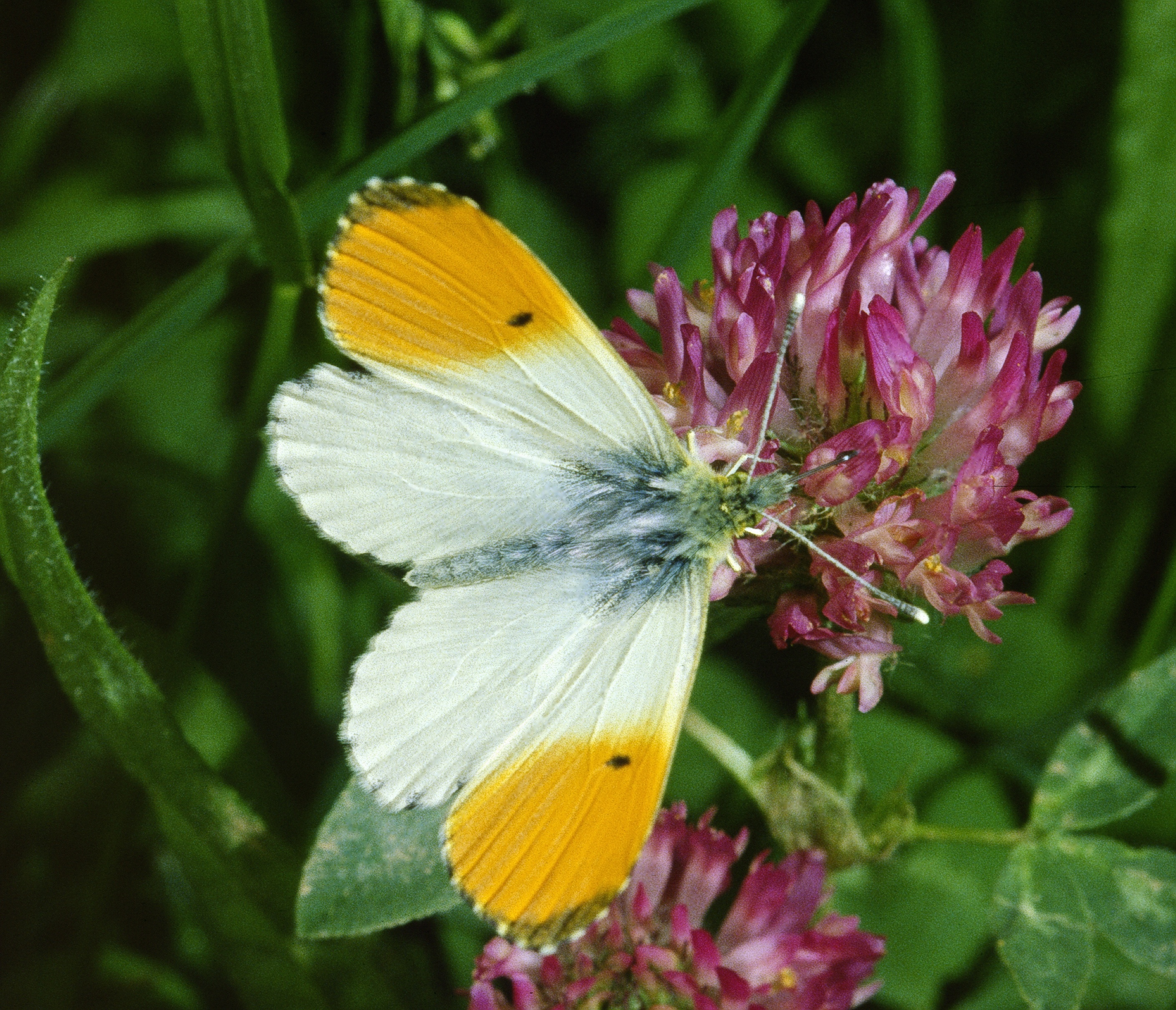
- Anthocharis cardamines
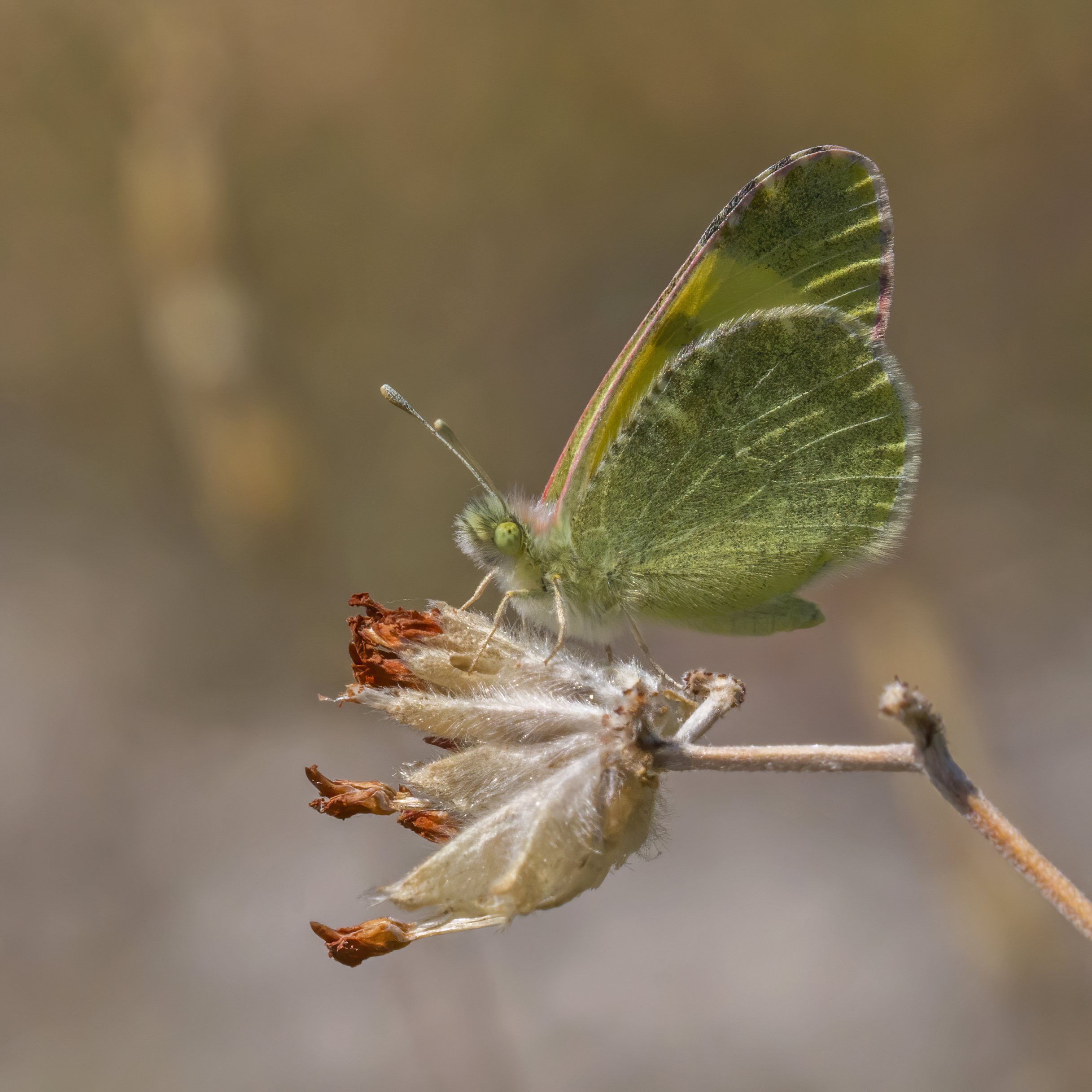
- Euchloe penia

Scientific classification
- Domain: Eukaryota
- Kingdom: Animalia
- Phylum: Arthropoda
- Class: Insecta
- Order: Lepidoptera
- Family: Pieridae
- Subfamily: Pierinae
- Tribe: Anthocharini; J.W. Tutt, 1896

Genera
- Anthocharis; Cunizza; Elphinstonia; Eroessa; Euchloe; Hebomoia; Hesperocharis; Mathania; Zegris

= Anthocharini =

Tribe of insects

The tribe Anthocharini is one of the subdivisions of the insect order Lepidoptera, which includes the moths and butterflies. It is a further subdivision of the butterfly family Pieridae and subfamily Pierinae; formerly it was considered a subfamily on its own, Anthocharinae. This tribe includes many, but not all, of the orangetip butterflies.

Some notable species and subspecies of tribe Anthocharini include:

- Catalina orangetip (Anthocharis cethura catalina)
- Desert orangetip (Anthocharis cethura cethura)
- Eastern dappled white (Euchloe ausonia)
- Eastern greenish black-tip (Euchloe penia)
- Eastern orange tip (Anthocharis damone)
- Falcate orangetip (Anthocharis midea)
- Gray marble (Anthocharis lanceolata)
- Green-striped white (Euchloe belemia), and several subspecies
- Greenish black-tip (Euchloe charlonia)
- Grüner's orange tip (Anthocharis gruneri), and several subspecies
- Mexican orangetip (Anthocharis limonea)
- Morocco orange tip (Anthocharis belia)
- Olympia marble (Euchloe olympia)
- Orange tip (Anthocharis cardamines), and many subspecies, including A. c. phoenissa
- Portuguese dappled white (Euchloe tagis), and many subspecies, including E. t. tagis, E. t. castellana, E. t. bellezina, E. t. reisseri and others
- Provence orange tip (Anthocharis euphenoides)
- Sara's orangetip (Anthocharis sara), and several subspecies
- Sooty orange tip (Zegris eupheme)
- Southern Rocky Mountain orangetip (Anthocharis julia)
- Southwestern orangetip (Anthocharis thoosa)
- Stella orangetip (Anthocharis stella)
- Yellow tip (Anthocharis scolymus)
