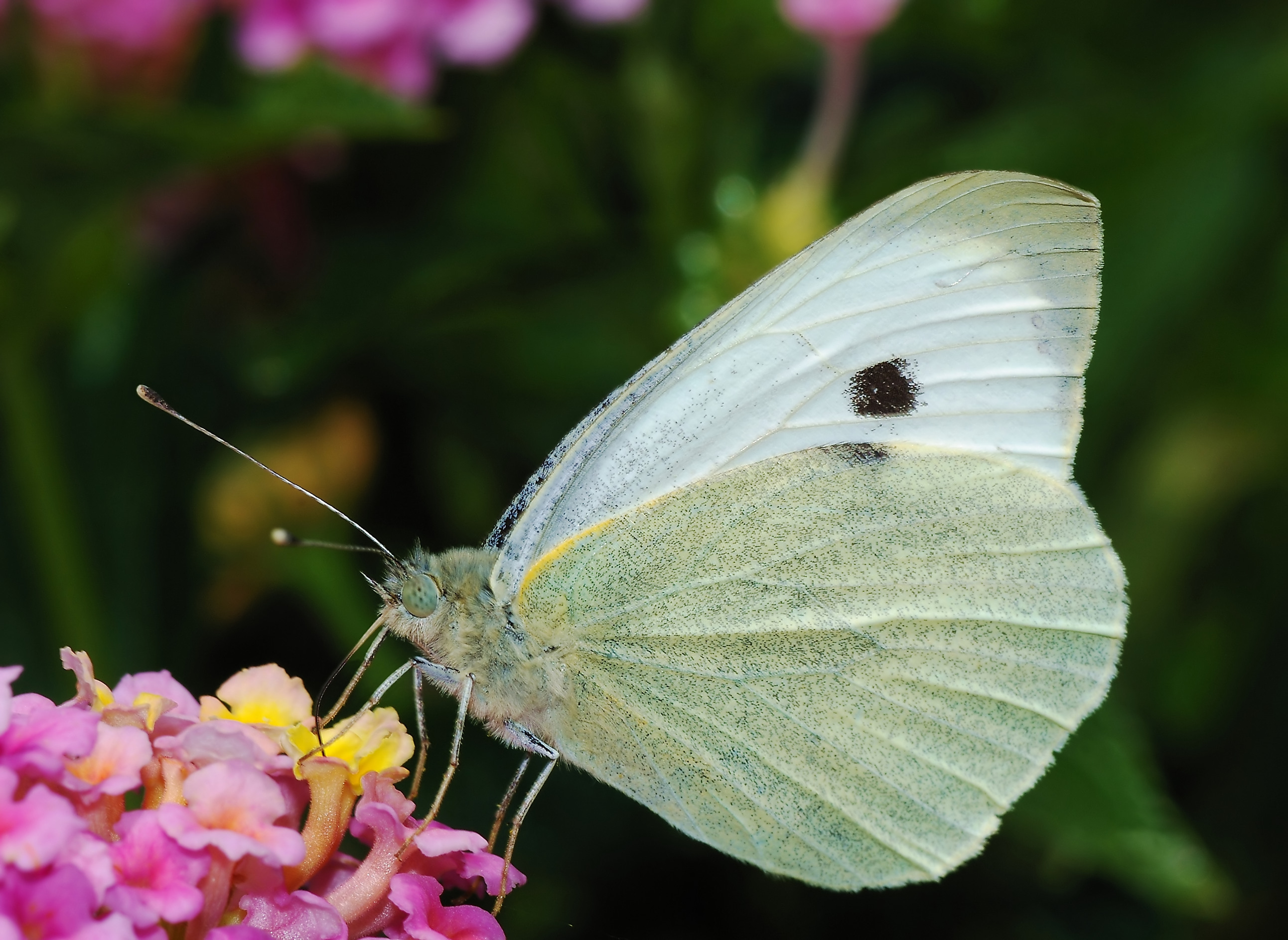
- Pieris rapae (small white)

Scientific classification
- Kingdom: Animalia
- Phylum: Arthropoda
- Class: Insecta
- Order: Lepidoptera
- Family: Pieridae
- Subfamily: Pierinae; Swainson, 1820

Tribes
- Elodinini Braby, 2014; Leptosiaini Braby, 2014; Nepheroniini Braby, 2014; Teracolini Reuter, 1896; Anthocharini Scudder, 1889; Pierini Swainson, 1820

= Pierinae =

Subfamily of butterflies

The Pierinae are a large subfamily of pierid butterflies. The subfamily is one of several clades of butterflies often referred to as the whites.

== Species ==
It includes the following species (additional species can be found under the tribes listed in the adjacent box):

- Anthocharis belia – Morocco orange tip
- Anthocharis cethura – desert orangetip
  - Anthocharis cethura catalina – Catalina orangetip
- Anthocharis damone – eastern orange tip
- Anthocharis euphenoides – Provence orange tip
- Anthocharis gruneri – Grüner's orange tip
- Anthocharis julia – southern Rocky Mountain orangetip
- Anthocharis lanceolata – gray marble
- Anthocharis limonea – Mexican orangetip
- Anthocharis midea – falcate orangetip
- Anthocharis sara – Sara's orangetip
  - Anthocharis sara thoosa – southwestern orangetip
- Anthocharis scolymus – yellow tip
- Anthocharis stella – Stella orangetip
  - Anthocharis stella browningi – Utah Stella orangetip
- Euchloe belemia – green-striped white
- Euchloe charlonia – greenish black-tip
- Euchloe crameri – western dappled white
- Euchloe olympia – Olympia marble
- Phoebis avellaneda – red-splashed sulphur
- Pieris angelika – Arctic white
- Pieris brassicae – large white
- Pieris marginalis – margined white
  - Pieris marginalis reicheli – Reichel's margined white
- Pieris oleracea – mustard white
  - Pieris oleracea frigida – Newfoundland white
- Pieris rapae – small white
- Pieris virginiensis – West Virginia white butterfly
