= Orange tip =

Orange tip or orangetip refers to:

- Anthocharini, a tribe of butterflies.
- Anthocharis, a specific genus in the tribe Anthocharini.
- Anthocharis cardamines, a single species in the genus Anthocharis, commonly found in Europe and temperate Asia.
- Colotis, a genus of butterflies in the tribe Colotini endemic to Africa and India.
- Hebomoia glaucippe, the great orange tip butterfly.
