= Delias paoaiensis =

Scientific classification
- Kingdom: Animalia
- Phylum: Arthropoda
- Clade: Pancrustacea
- Class: Insecta
- Order: Lepidoptera
- Family: Pieridae
- Genus: Delias
- Species: D. paoaiensis

Binomial name
- Delias paoaiensis Inomata & Nakano, 1987

Species of butterfly

Delias paoaiensis is a species of pierine butterfly endemic to Cordillera Central Mountains of Luzon, in the Philippines.

The wingspan is 52–56 mm. The species was originally described as a subspecies of Delias nuydaorum, but can be distinguished by the paler yellow marking on the underside of the forewings and hindwings.
