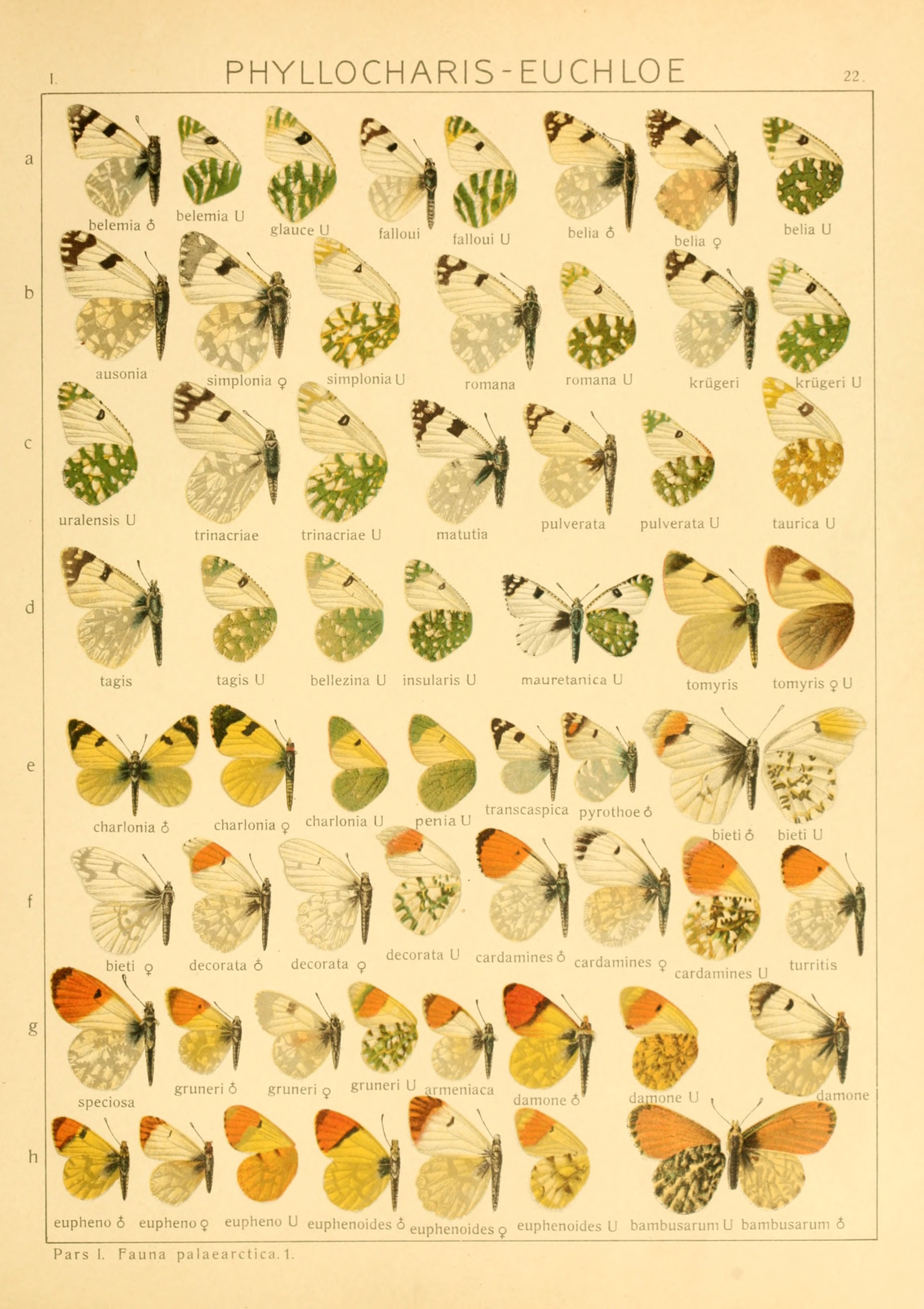
- Anthocharis bieti in Adalbert Seitz's Macrolepidoptera of the World

Scientific classification
- Kingdom: Animalia
- Phylum: Arthropoda
- Class: Insecta
- Order: Lepidoptera
- Family: Pieridae
- Genus: Anthocharis
- Species: A. bieti

Binomial name
- Anthocharis bieti (Oberthür, 1882)

= Anthocharis bieti =

Species of butterfly

Anthocharis bieti is a butterfly which has a range that is confined to China. Subspecies A. b. tsangpoana was described from Tsangpo, Tibet.

"A. bieti Oberth. from West China (Ta-tsien-lu), has a white upperside, a black apical area, which is broader in the female, bearing in male an orange apical spot; underside similar to that of cardamines: the distal margin pointed below the apex. decorata form. nov. from the Kuku-nor, is smaller in both sexes, the fringes being very long, the black apical area of the forewing of the male broader, the orangeyellow spot larger and contiguous with the black area, the underside, especially of the hindwing, more sharply marked. In the female the dark apical area reduced to 2 small subapical costal spots and a roundish patch standing between the 2. and 3. median veins."
