= Delias ganymedes =

Scientific classification
- Domain: Eukaryota
- Kingdom: Animalia
- Phylum: Arthropoda
- Class: Insecta
- Order: Lepidoptera
- Family: Pieridae
- Genus: Delias
- Species: D. ganymedes

Binomial name
- Delias ganymedes Okumoto, 1981

Species of butterfly

Delias ganymedes is a species of pierine butterfly endemic to the Philippines. It has been recorded from Mount Canlaon (Negros Island), Mount Madia-as (Panay Island) and Mount Halcon (Mindoro Island).

The wingspan is 55–60 mm.

== Subspecies ==
- Delias ganymedes ganymedes (Mt. Canlaon, Negros Island)
- Delias ganymedes filarorum Nihira & Kawamura, 1987 (Mt. Madia-as, Panay Island)
- Delias ganymedes halconensis Nakano & Yagishita, 1993 (Mt. Halcon, Mindoro Island)
