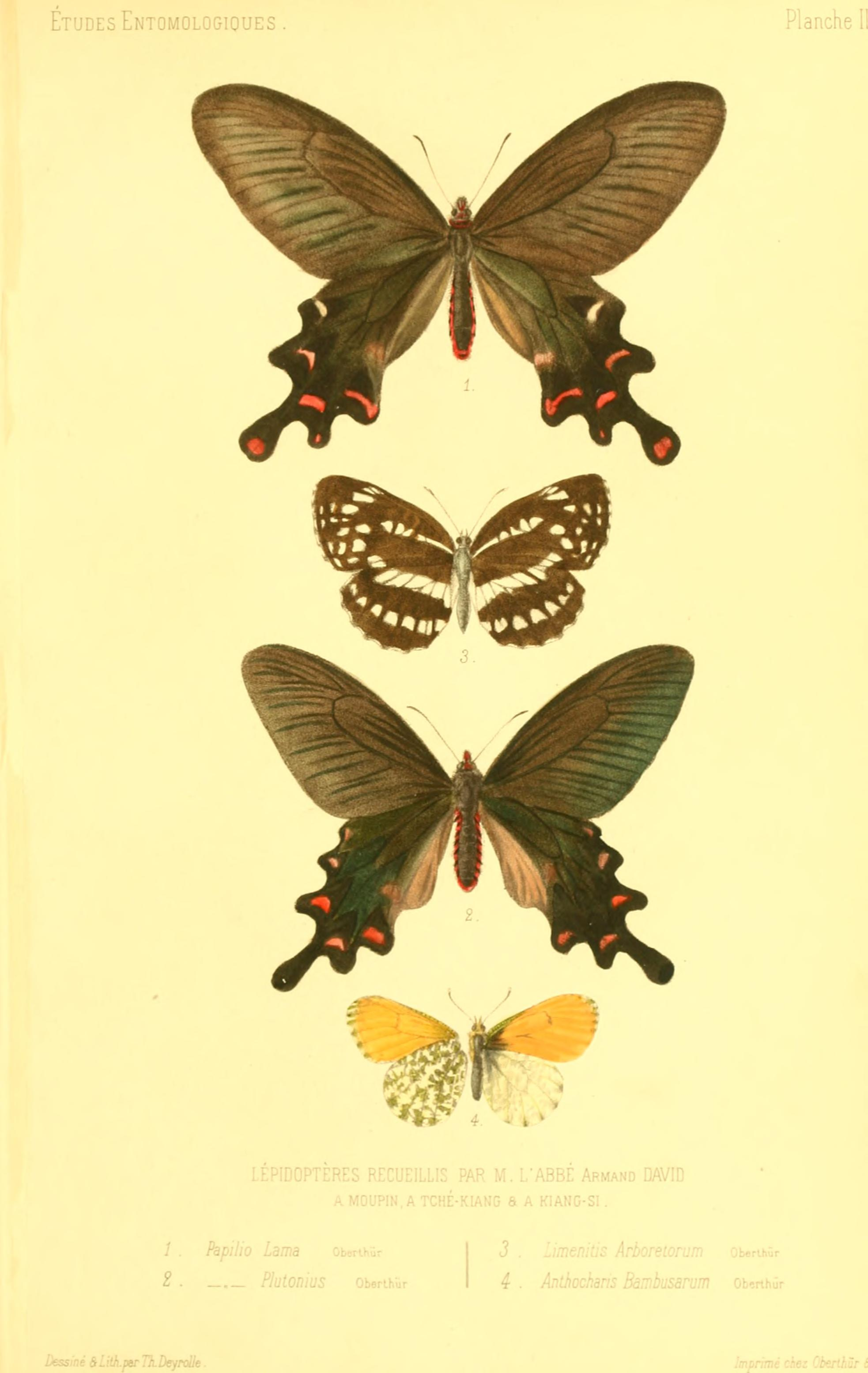
- Anthocharis bambusarum depicted in Oberthür, 1876 Ètudes d'entomologie: Lépidoptères de Chine.

Scientific classification
- Kingdom: Animalia
- Phylum: Arthropoda
- Class: Insecta
- Order: Lepidoptera
- Family: Pieridae
- Genus: Anthocharis
- Species: A. bambusarum

Binomial name
- Anthocharis bambusarum (Oberthür, 1876)

= Anthocharis bambusarum =

Species of butterfly

Anthocharis bambusarum is a butterfly which has a range of mainly in China and Eastern Asia. It has no known subspecies.

== Description in Seitz ==
"A. bambusarum from Tse-Kiang in China, is somewhat larger than Anthocharis cardamines the whole forewing above and beneath is uniformly dull orange-red; the apex of forewing less broadly dark and not black, but greenish, the black discocellular spot less distinct than in cardamines, the hindwing very similar to that of cardamines above and beneath." "extensa form. nov. [Röber] [now considered a synonym of Anthocharis bambusarum], from China (Nangking), leads over to the next form [speciosa], being a transitional link; almost the whole forewing orange-red, hardlv one-fourth of the wing being light yellow, the orange deeper than in the other forms, but not so dark as in [most] bambusarum.
