= Delias nuydaorum =

Scientific classification
- Domain: Eukaryota
- Kingdom: Animalia
- Phylum: Arthropoda
- Class: Insecta
- Order: Lepidoptera
- Family: Pieridae
- Genus: Delias
- Species: D. nuydaorum

Binomial name
- Delias nuydaorum Schröder, 1975

Species of butterfly

Delias nuydaorum is a species of pierine butterfly endemic to Mindanao in the Philippines. The type locality is Mount Kitanglad, Mindanao.

The wingspan is 52–57 mm.

== Subspecies ==
- Delias nuydaorum nuydaorum (Mt. Kitanglad, central Mindanao)
- Delias nuydaorum almae Schroeder & Treadaway, 2005 (southern Mindanao)
- Delias nuydaorum tagai Yagishita & Morita, 1996 (Mt. Matutum, southern Mindanao)
