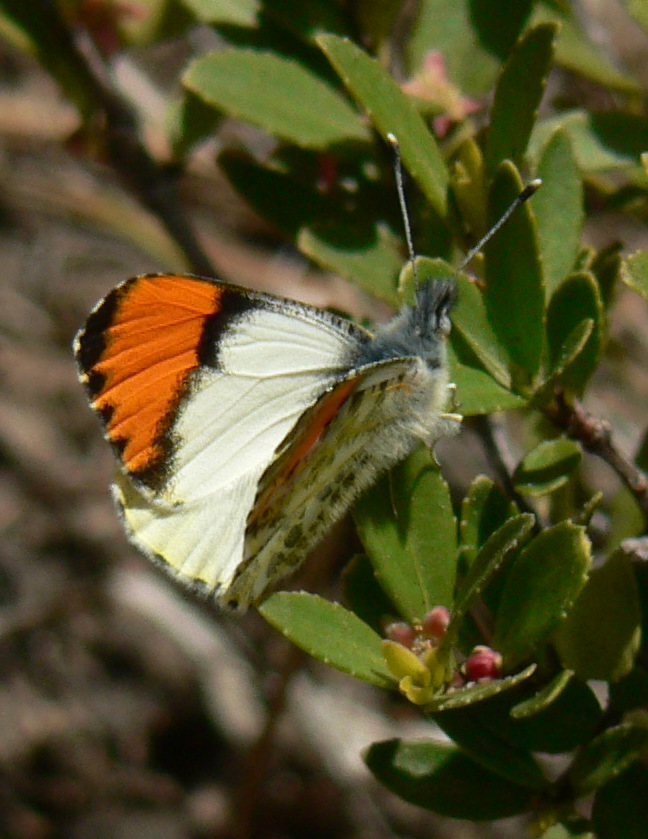
- Wenatchee National Forest
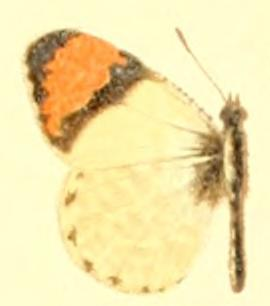

Conservation status
- Secure (NatureServe)

Scientific classification
- Kingdom: Animalia
- Phylum: Arthropoda
- Clade: Pancrustacea
- Class: Insecta
- Order: Lepidoptera
- Family: Pieridae
- Genus: Anthocharis
- Species: A. sara

Binomial name
- Anthocharis sara (Lucas, 1852)

Subspecies
- Sara orangetip (A. s. sara); Flora orangetip (A. s. flora); Alaskan orangetip (A. s. alaskensis); Gunder's orangetip (A. s. gunderi)

= Anthocharis sara =

Sara orangetip

Species of butterfly

Anthocharis sara, the Sara orangetip, is one of three species in the Sara orangetip complex. It has a population extending from Baja California into extreme southwest Oregon and another extending from the east slope of the Sierra Nevada into far western Nevada. The common name Pacific orangetip is obsolete since it implies a distribution that includes two separate species.

== Taxonomy ==
Anthocharis sara is part of the Anthocharis sara complex, along with the southwestern orangetip (Anthocharis thoosa) and Julia orangetip (Anthocharis julia).

Some have been spotted in the Grand Tetons Nation Park in June 2025.

A. sara contains four recognized subspecies:

- A. s. gunderi (Ingham, 1933), the Santa Catalina Island orangetip: Santa Catalina and Santa Cruz islands
- A. s. pseudothoosa (Austin, 1998): east slope of the Sierra Nevada and adjacent regions
- A. s. sara (Lucas, 1852): widespread west of the Sierra Nevada from the west coast of central Baja California north to southwestern Oregon
- A. s. sempervirens (Emmel, Emmel & Mattoon, 2008): Redwood National Park

== Life history ==
Like many butterfly species, they have strongly seasonal life cycles. A. sara have two consecutive flights at one point in the year and are not present for the other half of the year. The first brood lives from late January to April and the second brood lives from May to early July. There has been known to occasionally be some overlap between the two generations. In captivity, the pupae of A. sara have been observed staying in diapause for up to three years. The species is found in a variety of habitats including orchards, fields, meadows, and canyons.

== Description ==
The adult female orange-tip has orange tips at the ends of its wings while the male has ultraviolet reflective tips that appear orange to human eyes but appear "bee purple" to the butterfly. Females lay creamy white eggs that turn orange-red a few hours after they are laid. Fifth instar A. sara larvae are a dark green color and have small black pinacula. The larvae are a plain green, and when they mature they form a light brown, thorn-shaped pupa.

== Reproductive behavior ==
During the mating season, the males patrol, flying up and down a linear path as a way to increase the likelihood of sexual encounters with females. Males usually patrol by the sides of streams and roads in the canyon bottoms. There seems to be a hierarchy between the males in which the best sites are taken by the dominant males.

== Host plants ==
A. sara commonly lay their eggs on plants in the mustard family (Cruciferae) such as Arabis perennans, Athysanus pusillus, and Brassica nigra. A. sara lay their eggs on the stems, pedicels, and the bases of petioles of these plants, and less commonly they have been known to lay their eggs on the buds, flowers, and leaves of these plants. When the larvae emerge, they eat the buds, flowers, and fruits of the host plants.

A. sara have also been found on non-native host plants in California such as Barbarea verna, Barbarea vulagris, Brassica napus, Brassica nigra, Brassica rapa, Capsella bursa-pastoris, Hirschfeldia incana, Tropaeolum spp., Raphanus sativus, Sinapis alba, Sinapis arvensis, and Sisymbrium officinale .
