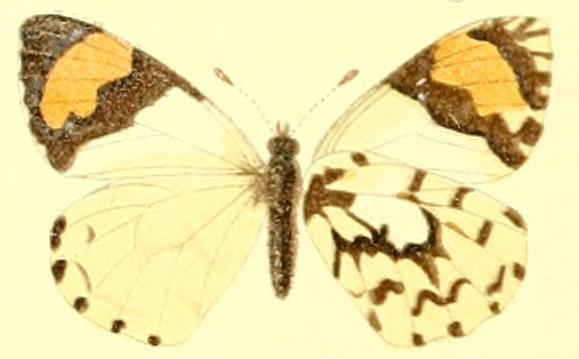

Scientific classification
- Kingdom: Animalia
- Phylum: Arthropoda
- Clade: Pancrustacea
- Class: Insecta
- Order: Lepidoptera
- Family: Pieridae
- Tribe: Anthocharini
- Genus: Eroessa; Doubleday, [1847]
- Species: E. chiliensis

Binomial name
- Eroessa chiliensis Guérin-Méneville, 1830

= Eroessa =

Monotypic butterfly genus in family Pieridae

Eroessa is a Neotropical genus of butterflies in the family Pieridae. The genus is monotypic containing the species Eroessa chiliensis which is endemic to Chile.
