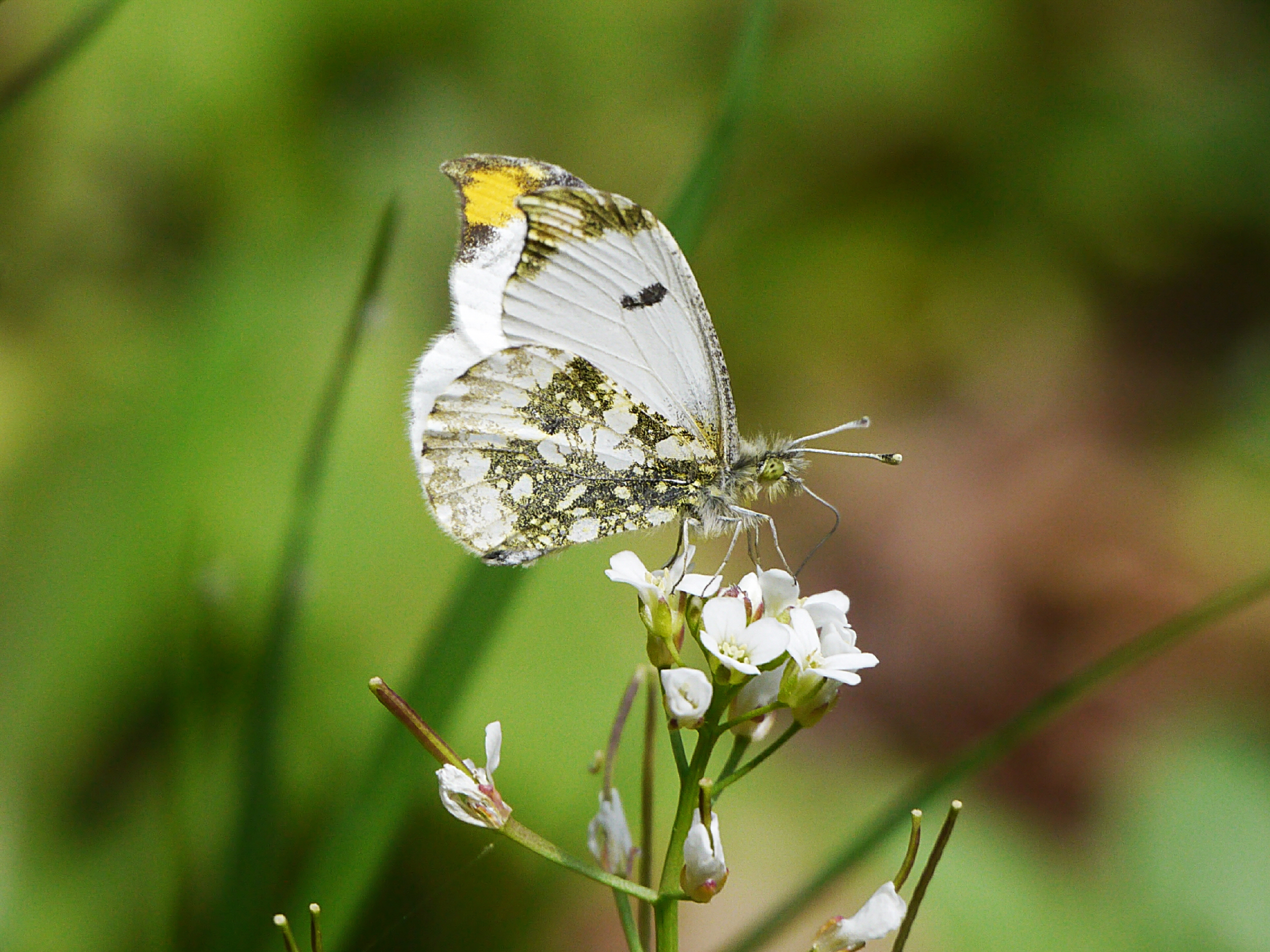

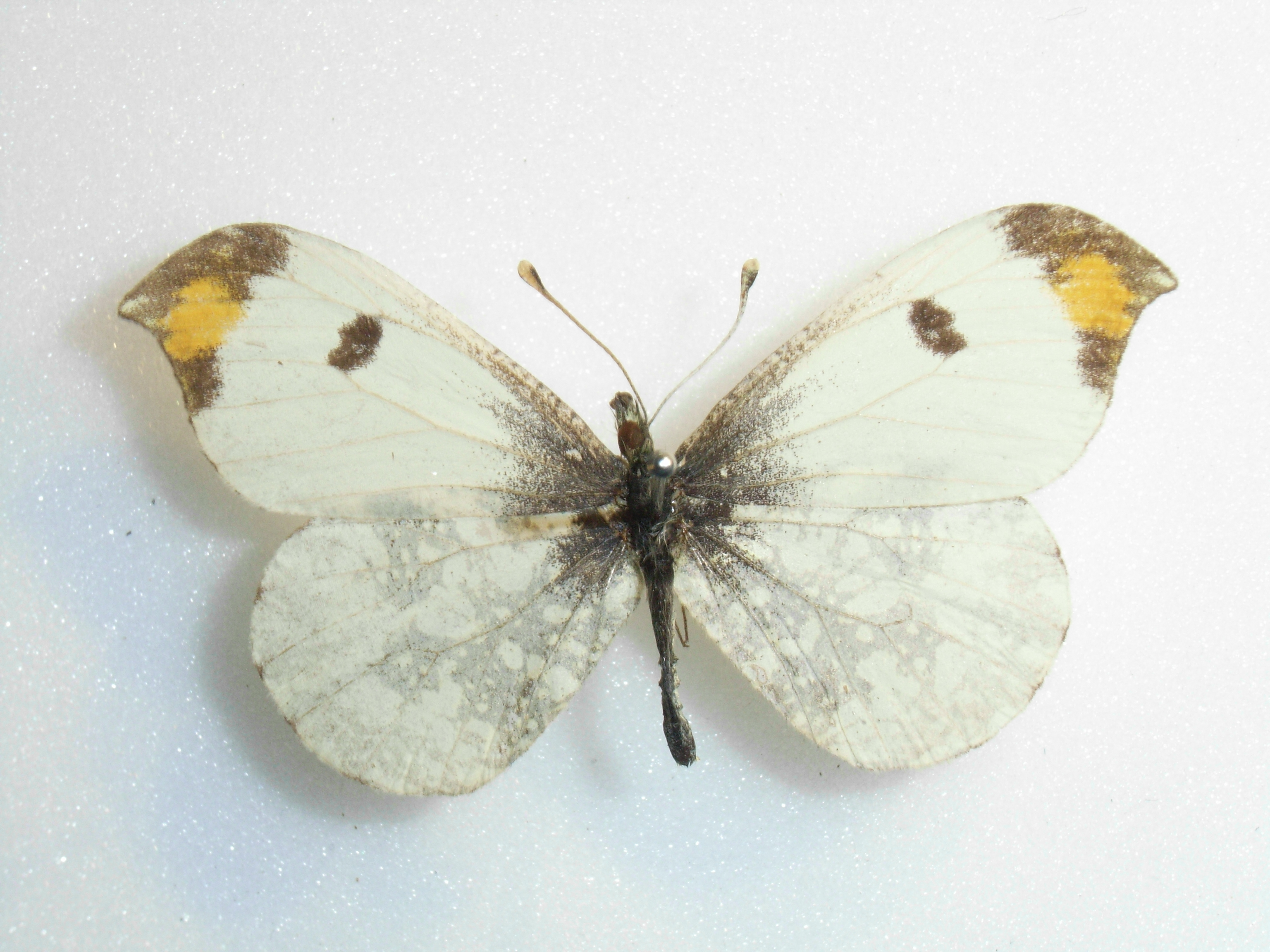

Scientific classification
- Kingdom: Animalia
- Phylum: Arthropoda
- Class: Insecta
- Order: Lepidoptera
- Family: Pieridae
- Genus: Anthocharis
- Species: A. scolymus

Binomial name
- Anthocharis scolymus (Butler, 1866)

= Anthocharis scolymus =

Yellow tip

Species of butterfly

Anthocharis scolymus, the yellow tip, is a butterfly in the subfamily Pierinae whose range is Eastern Asia (East China, Korea, Ussuri) where it is commonplace; occasionally it is found in Japan.

The apex of the forewing is produced and falcate (sickle-shaped); white above and below, with dark apical marking and black median spot on the forewing above, and a black spot at the apex of the hindwing; the male moreover, has a moderately large orange spot in the apical area of the forewing, occurring occasionally also in the female (= ab. virgo form. nov. The butterfly appears in one brood and is common in swampy places. The larva feeds on cress (Draba, Descurainia sophia, Arabis hirsuta, Cardamine impatiens, and Rorippa).
