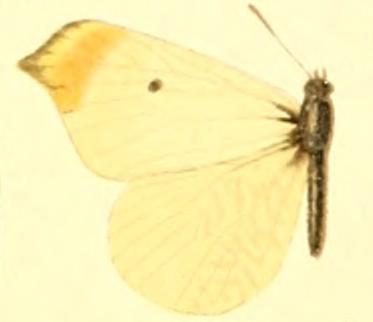

Scientific classification
- Kingdom: Animalia
- Phylum: Arthropoda
- Class: Insecta
- Order: Lepidoptera
- Family: Pieridae
- Genus: Anthocharis
- Species: A. limonea

Binomial name
- Anthocharis limonea Butler, 1871

= Anthocharis limonea =

Mexican orangetip

Species of butterfly

Anthocharis limonea, the Mexican orangetip, is a butterfly of the subfamily Pierinae mostly found in Mexico and the southwestern United States.
