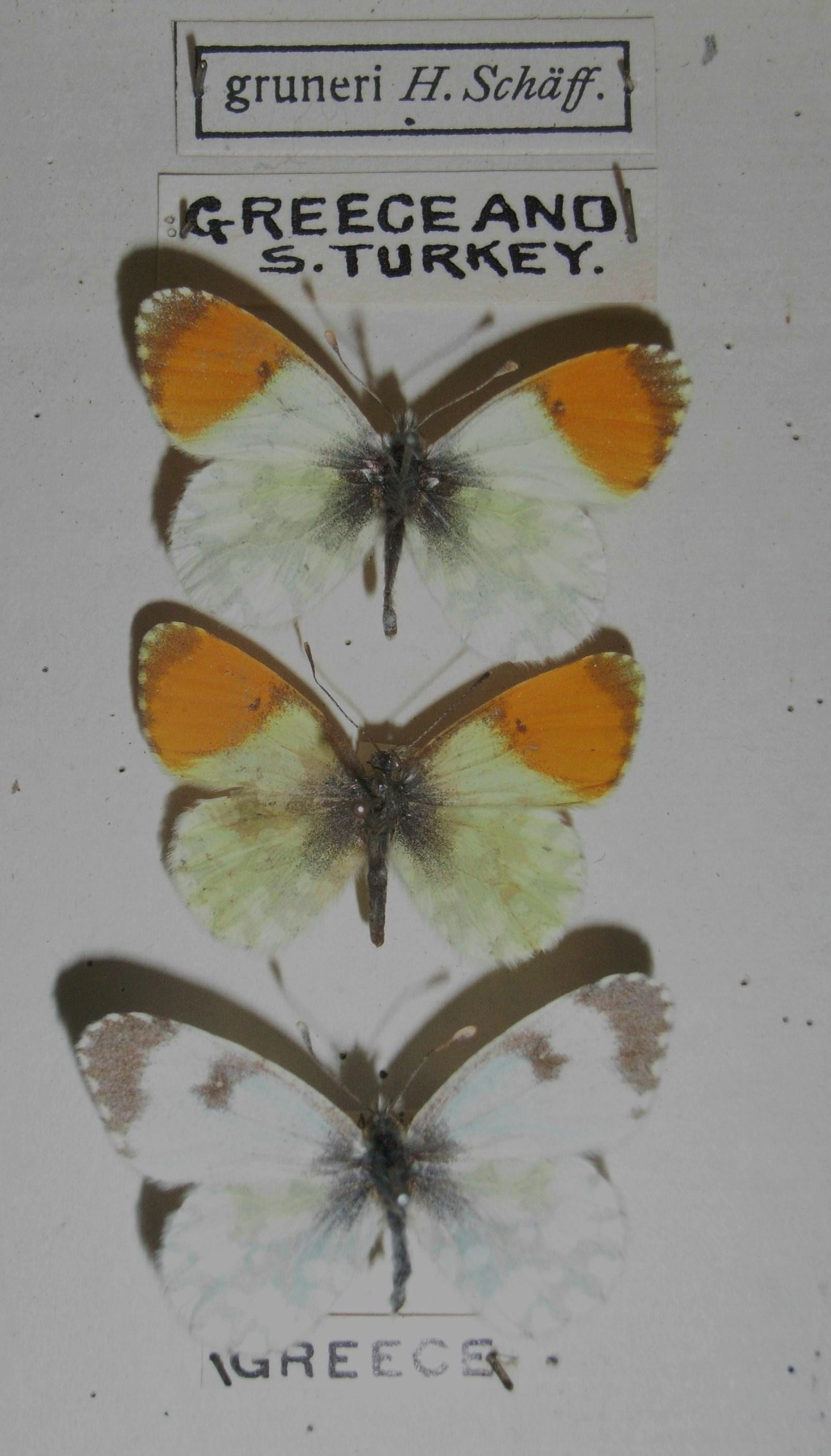
- Museum specimens

Scientific classification
- Kingdom: Animalia
- Phylum: Arthropoda
- Class: Insecta
- Order: Lepidoptera
- Family: Pieridae
- Genus: Anthocharis
- Species: A. gruneri

Binomial name
- Anthocharis gruneri (Herrich-Schäffer, 1851)

= Anthocharis gruneri =

Grüner's orange tip

Species of butterfly

Anthocharis gruneri (Grüner's orange tip) is a butterfly found mainly in Turkey, Transcaucasian Mountains, Asia Minor and the Armenian highlands.

== Description in Seitz ==
"A. gruneri H.-Sch. from Greece, Southern Turkey, and Asia Minor, is smaller than cardamines, but otherwise similar: the black apical markings broader in the male, the ground-colour of the upperside strongly yellowish. — armeniaca Christ. from Asia Minor and Mesopotamia, is more whitish above, and the orange-red apical patch proximally dark-edged. ab. homogena is an intermediate form. — Near Angora flies diluta form, nov. [Röber], which is distinguished by the less developed greenish markings of the underside of the hindwing, and in the female, besides, by the dark apex of the forewing being almost completely without markings. — In Syria, where this insect does not appear to be plentiful, there occurs a special form : small, upperside pure white, orange patch reduced, reaching only to the black median spot and having no dark proximal edge; underside of hindwing with much extended white markings; we [Röber] propose for this form the name eros" .

== Subspecies ==
- Anthocharis gruneri gruneri Greece, Asia Minor, Syria, Iraq, Iran, Transcaucasia
- Anthocharis gruneri armeniaca Christoph, 1893 Armenia highlands
- Anthocharis gruneri macedonica (Buresch, 1921) Macedonia
- Anthocharis gruneri parnassi (Bernardi, 1970)
- Anthocharis gruneri fereiduni (Carbonell et Back, 2009) Southwest Iran
- Anthocharis gruneri eros (Röber, 1907) Syria
- Anthocharis gruneri zamanii Naderi et Back, 2019 Southeast Iran

== Gallery ==
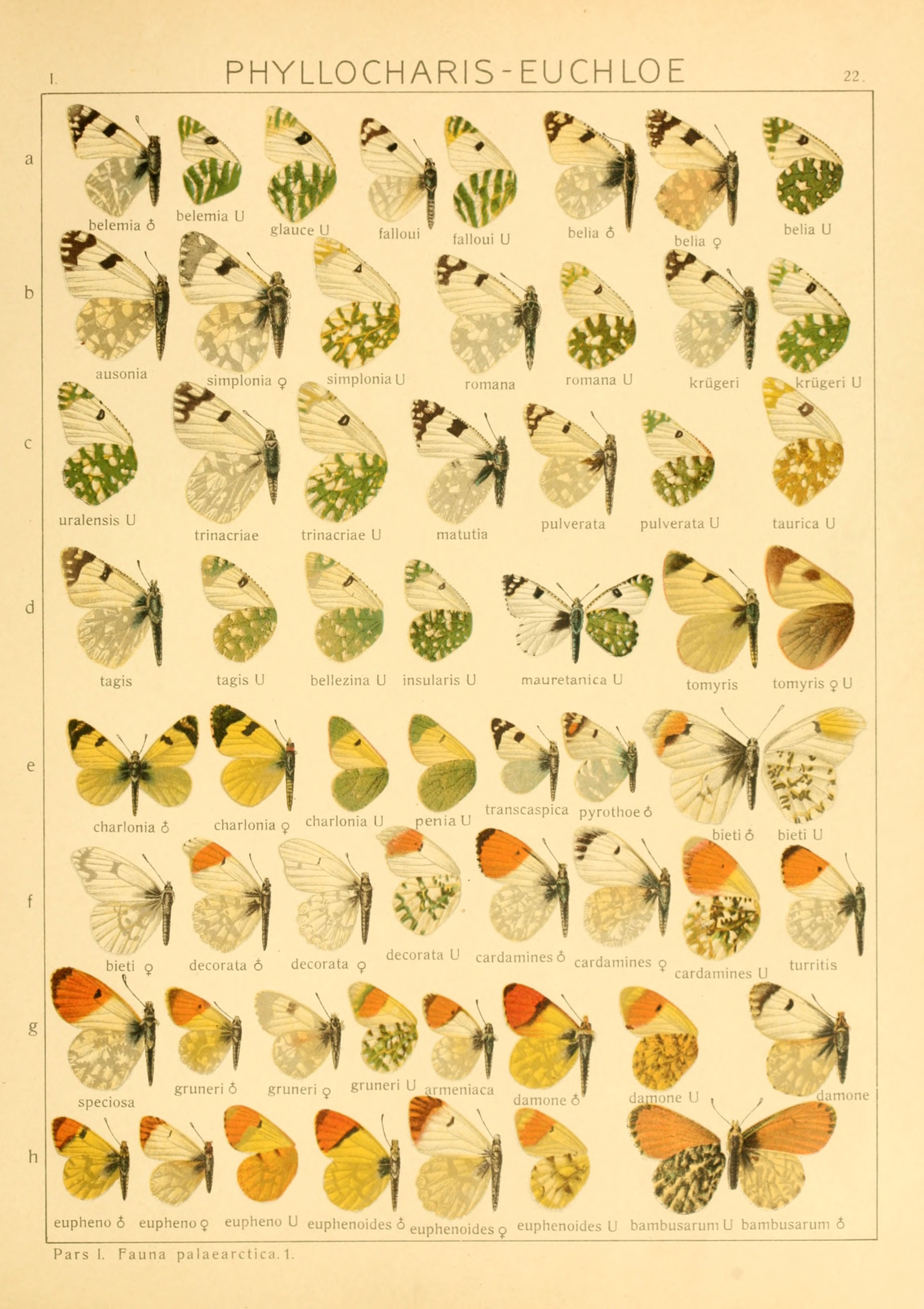
Anthocharis in Seitz

== Habitat ==
In Armenia A. gruneri inhabits semi-deserts, juniper woodlands, and arid mountain steppes at elevations from 400 to about 2000 m a.s.l.
