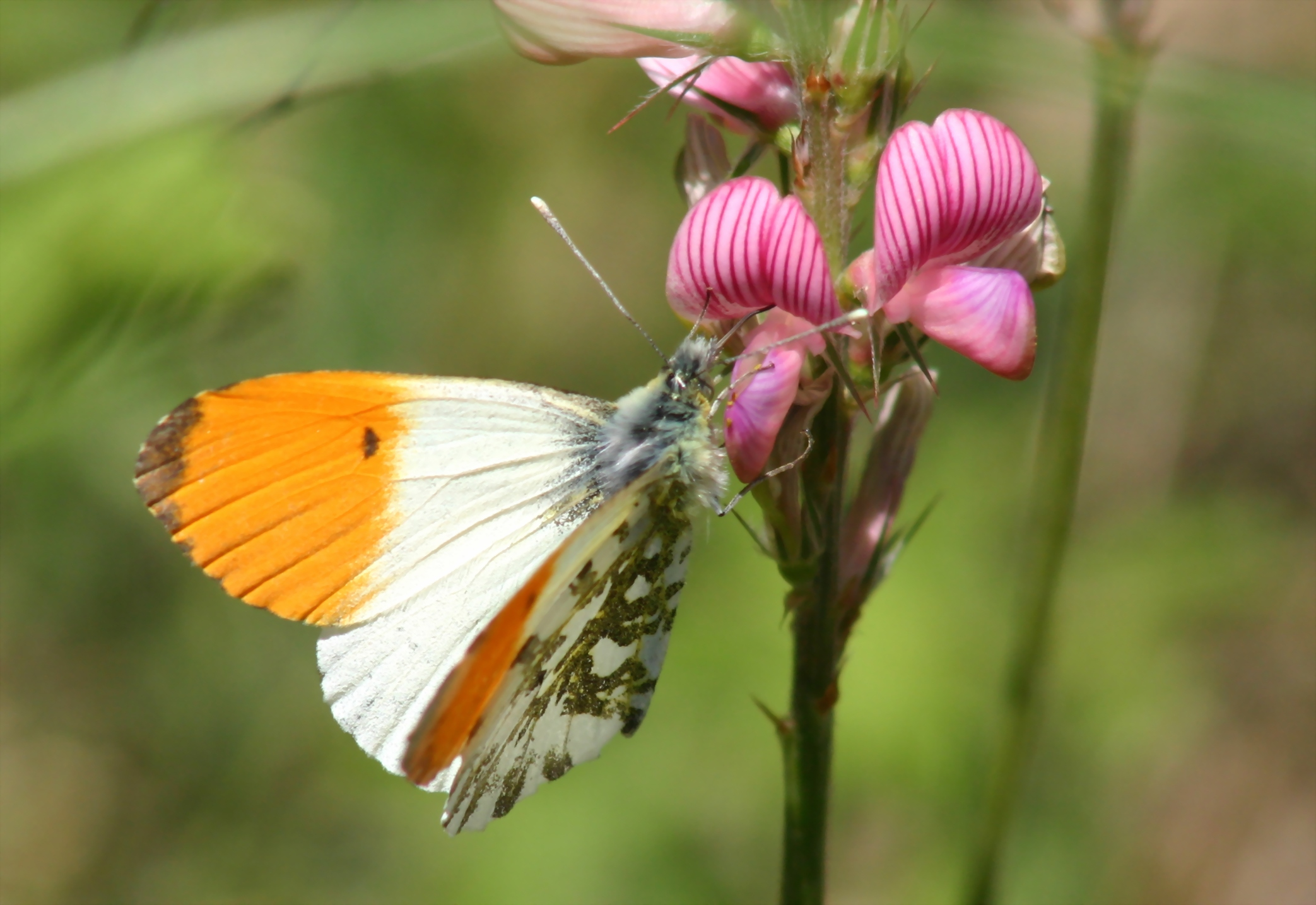
- Orange tip

Scientific classification
- Domain: Eukaryota
- Kingdom: Animalia
- Phylum: Arthropoda
- Class: Insecta
- Order: Lepidoptera
- Family: Pieridae
- Tribe: Anthocharini
- Genus: Anthocharis; Boisduval, Rambur, Duméril & Graslin, 1833

Species
- See text

Synonyms
- Midea Herrich-Schäffer, 1867 (preocc. Bruzelius, 1855); Tetracharis Grote, 1898; Paramidea Kusnezov, 1929; Falcapica Klots, 1930

= Anthocharis =

Butterfly genus in family Pieridae

Anthocharis is a holarctic genus of the butterfly tribe Anthocharini, in the family Pieridae. These are typically small, white-hued butterflies that have colorful marks just inside the tips of the forewings. The tip colors are usually a red-orange hue, hence the name "orange tip". The larvae of these butterfly often consume cruciferous plants containing chemicals called glucosinolates. This genus is characterized by two of the five subcostal veins branching off before the apex of the cell, by the upper radial being only little united with the subcostal, and by the central discocellular being rather long. In all the species the males have at least the apical portion of the forewing orange red or yellow. Only one species inhabits also the northern districts of the Palearctic region, all the others are found in the south of the Palearctic region, also some species occur in North America, but not one species extends into the tropics. The Anthocharis species have only one brood. The butterflies occur in spring.

== Species ==
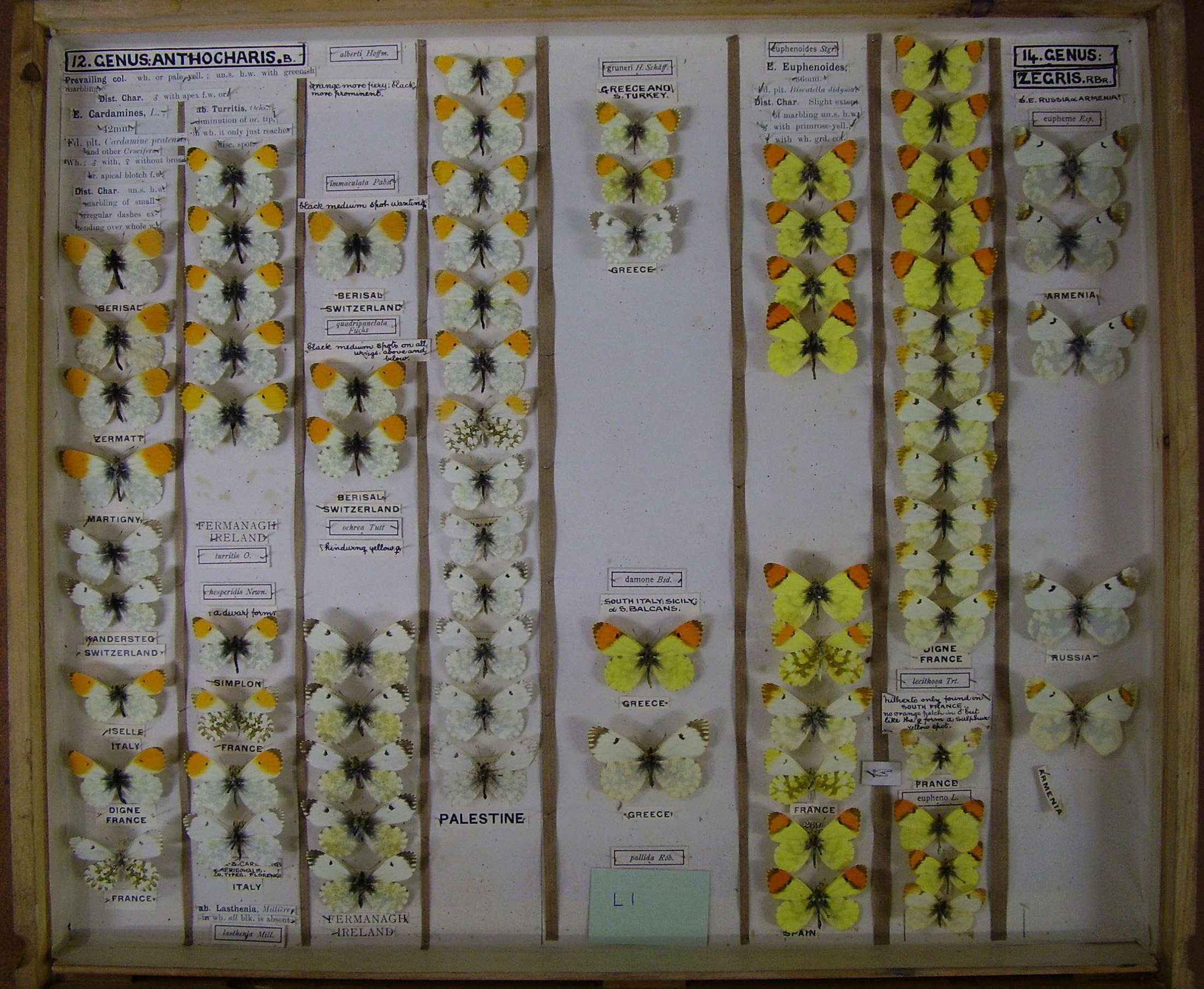
Museum drawer of Anthocharis and Zegris

Species and subspecies belonging to the genus Anthocharis include:

- Anthocharis bambusarum (Oberthür)
- Anthocharis belia (Linnaeus, 1767) – Morocco orange tip
- Anthocharis bieti (Oberthür, 1884)
- Anthocharis cardamines (Linnaeus, 1758) – orange tip
  - Anthocharis cardamines phoenissa (Kalchberg, 1894)
- Anthocharis carolinae Back, 2006 (Mazandaran (Iran), South Armenia)
- Anthocharis cethura (C. & R. Felder, 1865) – desert orangetip
  - Anthocharis cethura cethura – desert orangetip
  - Anthocharis cethura bajacalifornica J.F. Emmel, T.C. Emmel & Mattoon, 1998
  - Anthocharis cethura catalina (Meadows, 1937) – Catalina orangetip
  - Anthocharis cethura pima W.H. Edwards, 1888
- Anthocharis damone (Boisduval, 1836) – eastern orange tip
- Anthocharis euphenoides (Staudinger, 1869) – Provence orange tip
- Anthocharis gruneri (Herrich-Schäffer, 1851) – Grüner's orange tip
- Anthocharis julia (Edwards, 1872) – southern Rocky Mountain orangetip
- Anthocharis lanceolata (Lucas, 1852) – gray marble
  - Anthocharis lanceolata australis (Grinnell, 1908)
  - Anthocharis lanceolata desertolimbus J.F. Emmel, T.C. Emmel & Mattoon, 1998
- Anthocharis limonea (Butler, 1871) – Mexican orangetip
- Anthocharis midea (Hübner, 1809) – falcate orangetip
  - Anthocharis midea texas Gatrelle, 1998
- Anthocharis monastiriensis Soures, 1998 (Tunisia)
- Anthocharis sara (Lucas, 1852) – Sara's orangetip
  - Anthocharis sara inghami Gunder, 1932
  - Anthocharis sara thoosa (Scudder, 1878) – southwestern orangetip
- Anthocharis scolymus (Butler, 1866) – yellow tip
- Anthocharis stella (Edwards, 1879) – Stella orangetip
  - Anthocharis stella stella – Stella orangetip
  - Anthocharis stella browningi – Utah Stella orangetip
- Anthocharis taipaichana (Verity, 1911)
- Anthocharis thibetana (Oberthür, 1886) (West China) has the orange patch as in A. cardamines turritis, but the veins of the hindwing above are bordered with sulfur-yellow.
