= Anthocharis cardamines phoenissa =

Scientific classification
- Kingdom: Animalia
- Phylum: Arthropoda
- Class: Insecta
- Order: Lepidoptera
- Family: Pieridae
- Genus: Anthocharis
- Species: A. cardamines
- Subspecies: A. c. phoenissa

Trinomial name
- Anthocharis cardamines phoenissa von Kalchberg, 1895

Species of butterfly

Anthocharis cardamines phoenissa is a subspecies of orange tip butterfly found mostly in the Middle East. "Of local forms we have to mention phoenissa Kalrhh.. from Syria, like ab. turritis, but purer white beneath."
