= Anthocharis stella browningi =

Utah Stella orangetip

Scientific classification
- Kingdom: Animalia
- Phylum: Arthropoda
- Class: Insecta
- Order: Lepidoptera
- Family: Pieridae
- Genus: Anthocharis
- Species: A. stella
- Subspecies: A. s. browningi

Trinomial name
- Anthocharis stella browningi (Edwards, 1872)

Species of butterfly

Anthocharis stella browningi, the Utah Stella orangetip, is a subspecies of the Stella orangetip mainly found in the southern American Rocky Mountains especially in the drier areas.
