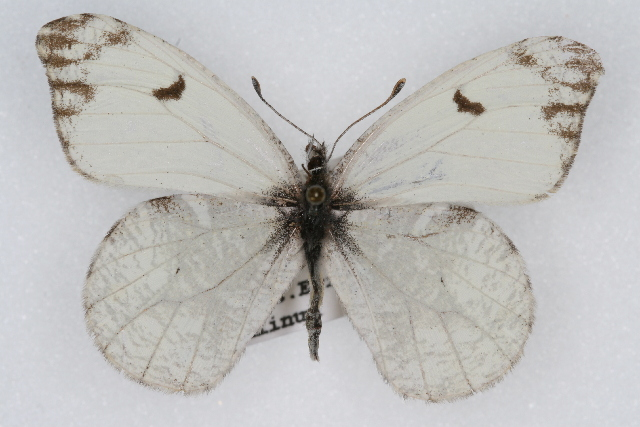

Conservation status
- Apparently Secure (NatureServe)

Scientific classification
- Kingdom: Animalia
- Phylum: Arthropoda
- Clade: Pancrustacea
- Class: Insecta
- Order: Lepidoptera
- Family: Pieridae
- Genus: Anthocharis
- Species: A. lanceolata

Binomial name
- Anthocharis lanceolata (H. Lucas, 1852)

= Anthocharis lanceolata =

Species of butterfly

Anthocharis lanceolata, the gray marble, is a butterfly in the family Pieridae. The species was first described by Hippolyte Lucas in 1852. Its range is the west coast of United States and Canada.
