= Anthocharis cethura catalina =

Catalina orangetip

Scientific classification
- Kingdom: Animalia
- Phylum: Arthropoda
- Class: Insecta
- Order: Lepidoptera
- Family: Pieridae
- Genus: Anthocharis
- Species: A. cethura
- Subspecies: A. c. catalina

Trinomial name
- Anthocharis cethura catalina Meadows, 1937

Species of butterfly

Anthocharis cethura catalina, the Catalina orangetip, is a subspecies of the desert orangetip butterfly that is endemic to Santa Catalina Island, off the California coast of the United States. Very little is known about the subspecies, except that they tend to be found on isolated ridgetops.
