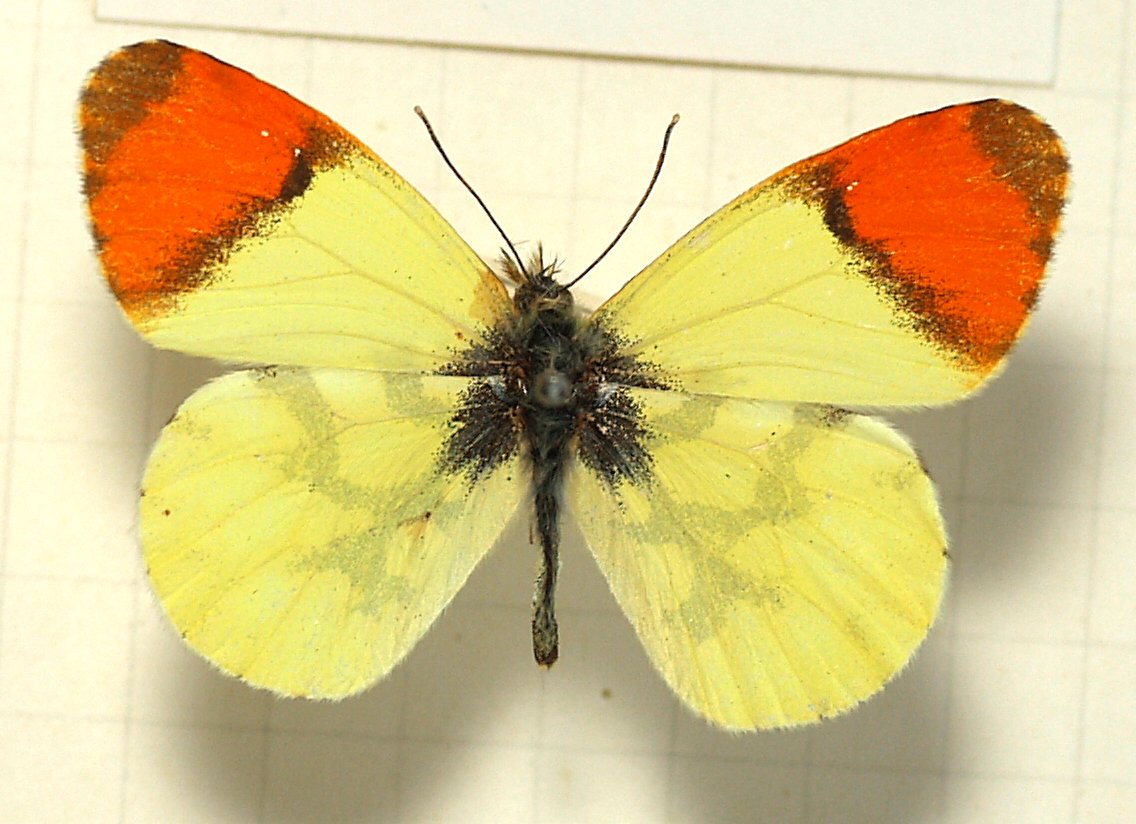

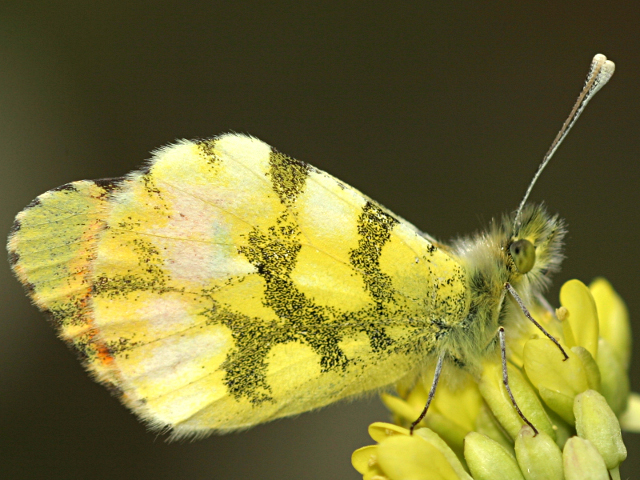

Conservation status
- Least Concern (IUCN 3.1)

Scientific classification
- Kingdom: Animalia
- Phylum: Arthropoda
- Class: Insecta
- Order: Lepidoptera
- Family: Pieridae
- Genus: Anthocharis
- Species: A. euphenoides

Binomial name
- Anthocharis euphenoides Staudinger, 1869
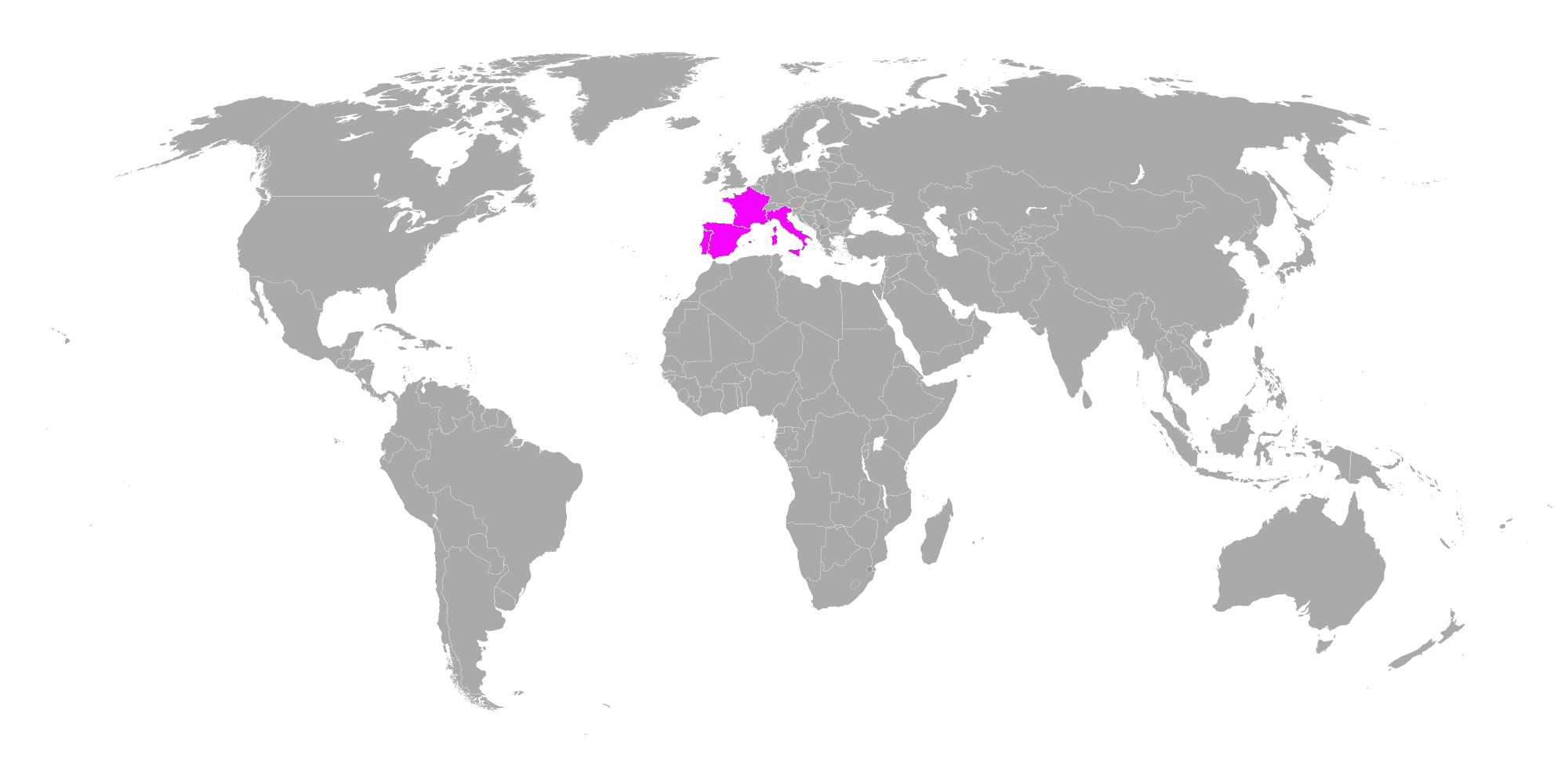

= Anthocharis euphenoides =

Provence orange tip

Species of butterfly

Anthocharis euphenoides, the Provence orange tip, is a species of butterfly in the family Pieridae. It is found in the Iberian Peninsula (missing in the southwest and northeast), in the south of France (from the eastern Pyrenees to the Alpes-Maritimes) and in Italy in the Abruzzo. There are a few records from Switzerland (Southern Ticino). Its caterpillars use Biscutella as their food source.

== Description ==
This butterfly has a very marked sexual dimorphism: the male is yellow with the apex of the forewings orange bordered by a small black band while the female is white with the apex orange and the same black band. The underside of the hindwings is marked with green and the apex of the forewings is orange in the male, yellow in the female.

== Description in Seitz ==
A. euphenoides is distinguished in both sexes only by the colour and markings of the underside of the hindwing. In the females the colour of the apical area of the upperside of forewing is very variable, for there occur also specimens with rather large reddish yellow patch. — ab. lecithosa Tur., hitherto only found in South France, has no orange patch in the male, but, like the female of this form, a sulphur-yellow apical spot. — Larva greenish, with yellow and black dorsal markings , white lateral stripes and large black dots, head green; in autumn on Biscutella species; it is a so-called cannibal-caterpillar. Pupa light brown, also green, very strongly incurved (Spuler).

== Gallery ==
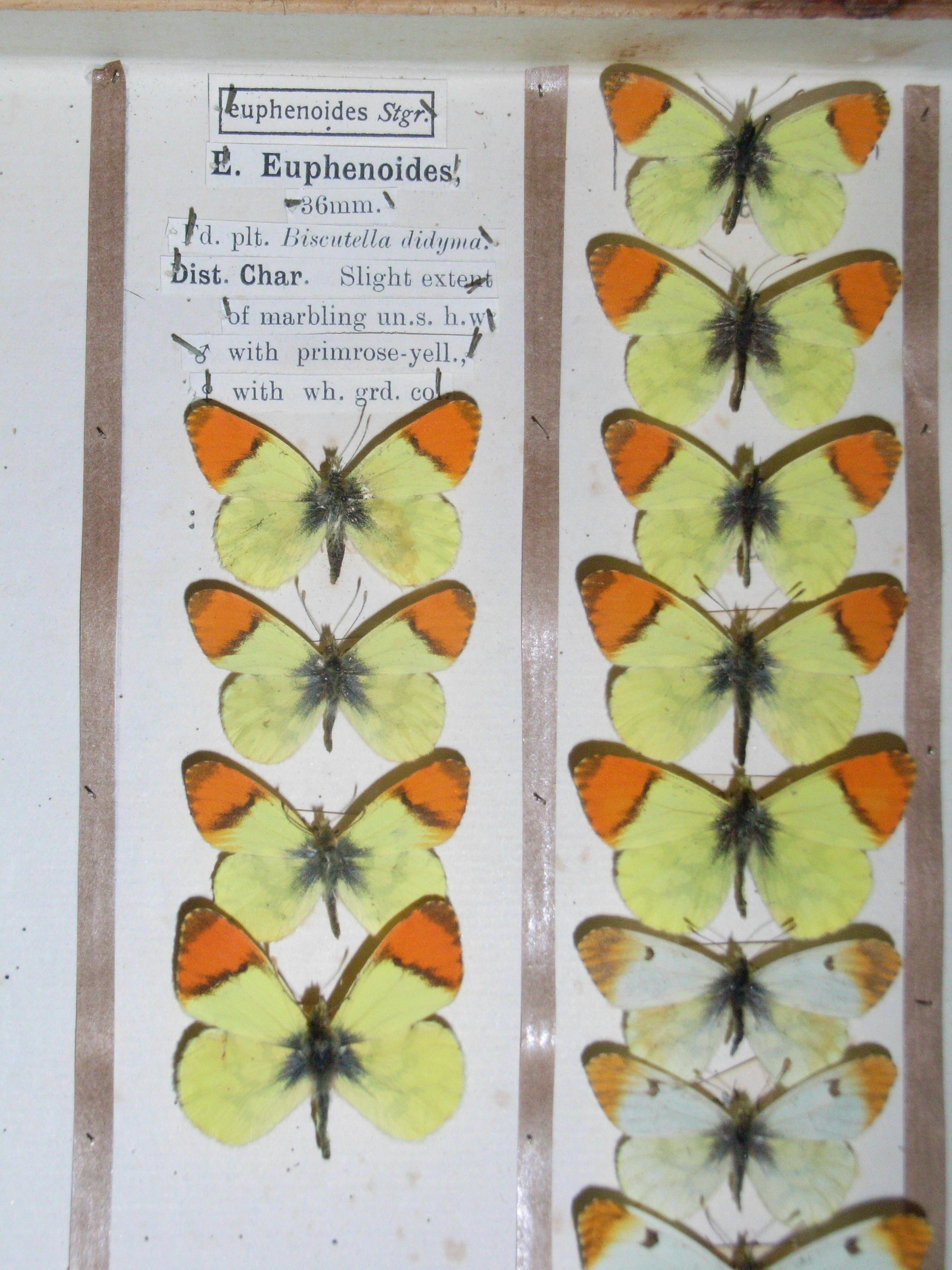
Museum specimens of Provence orange tip

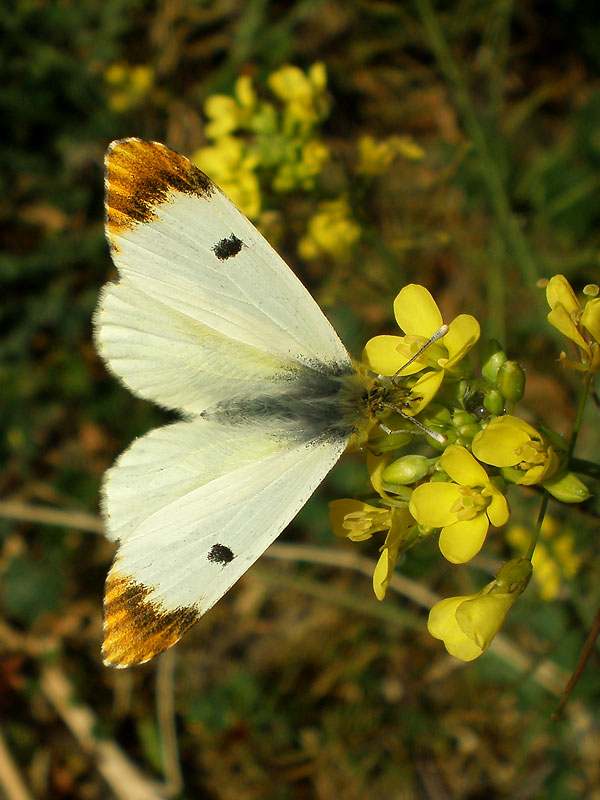
Female

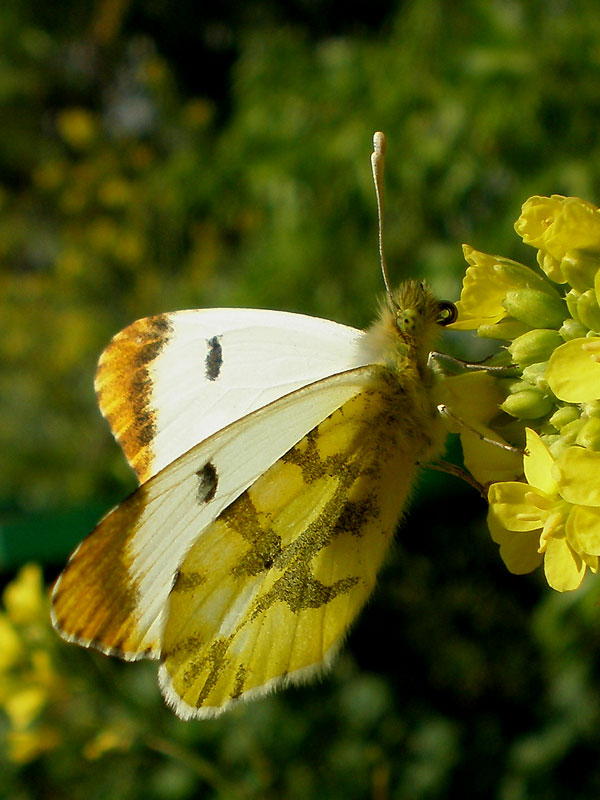
Female

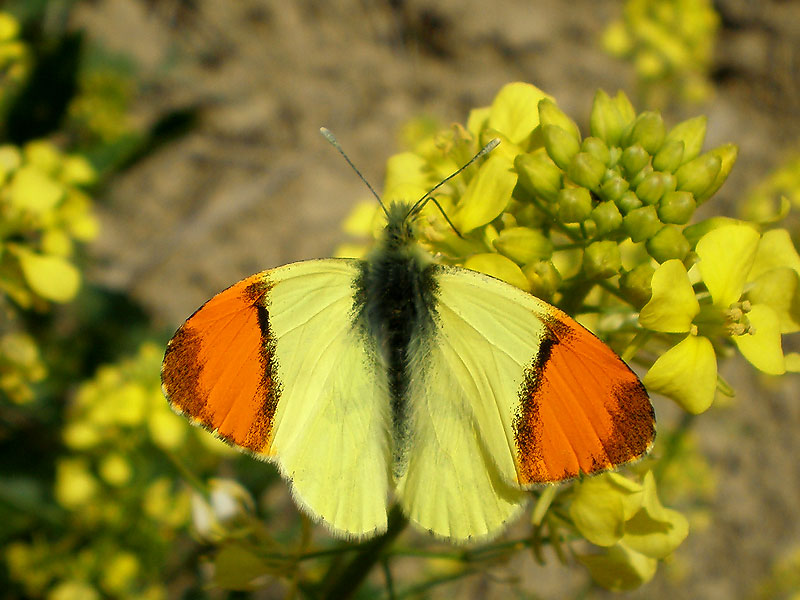
Male

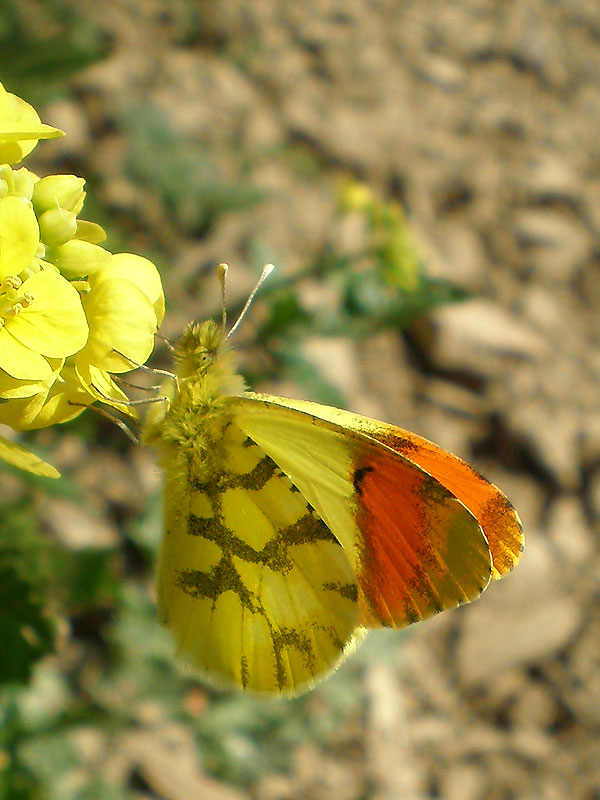
Male

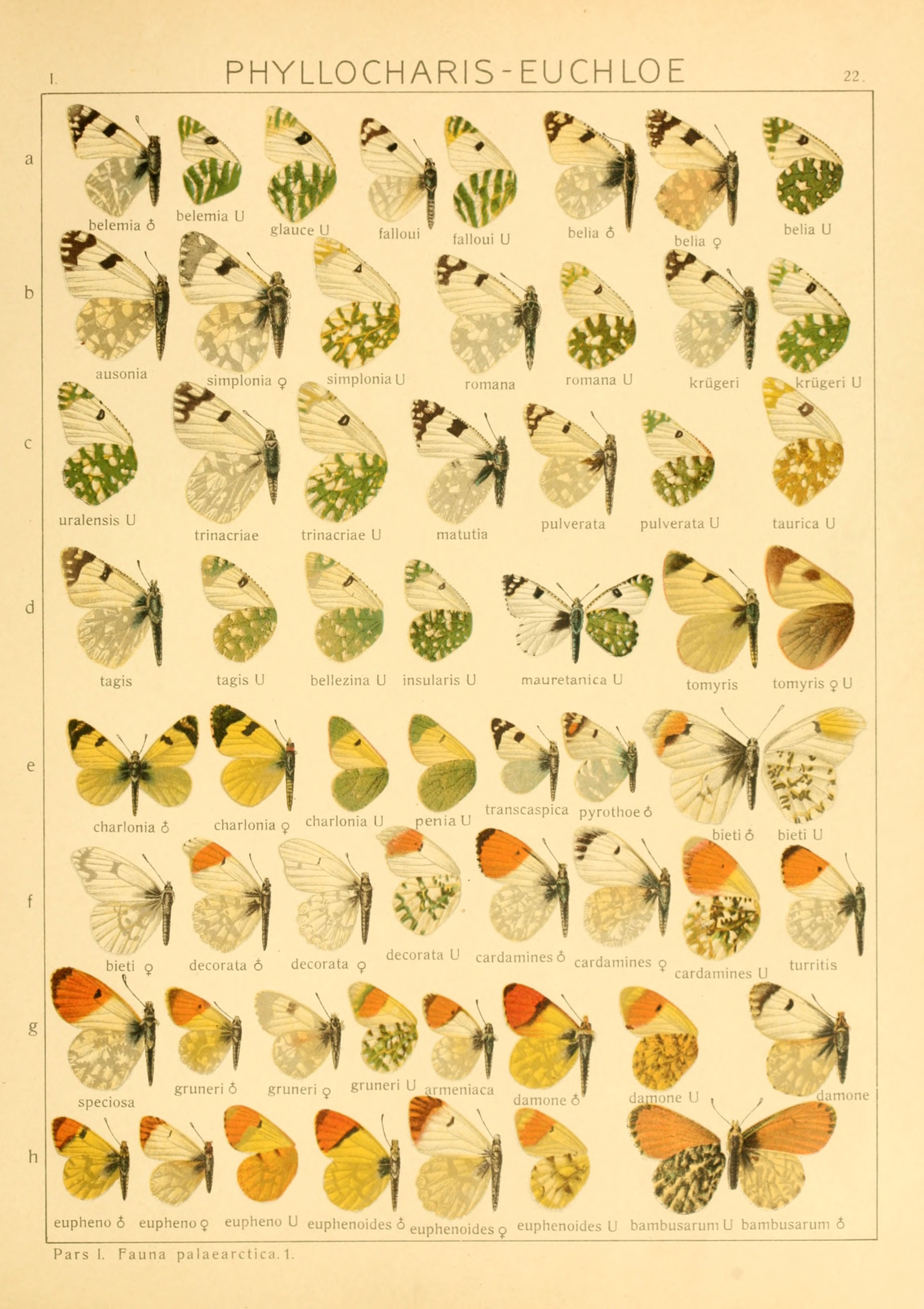
Anthocharis in Seitz

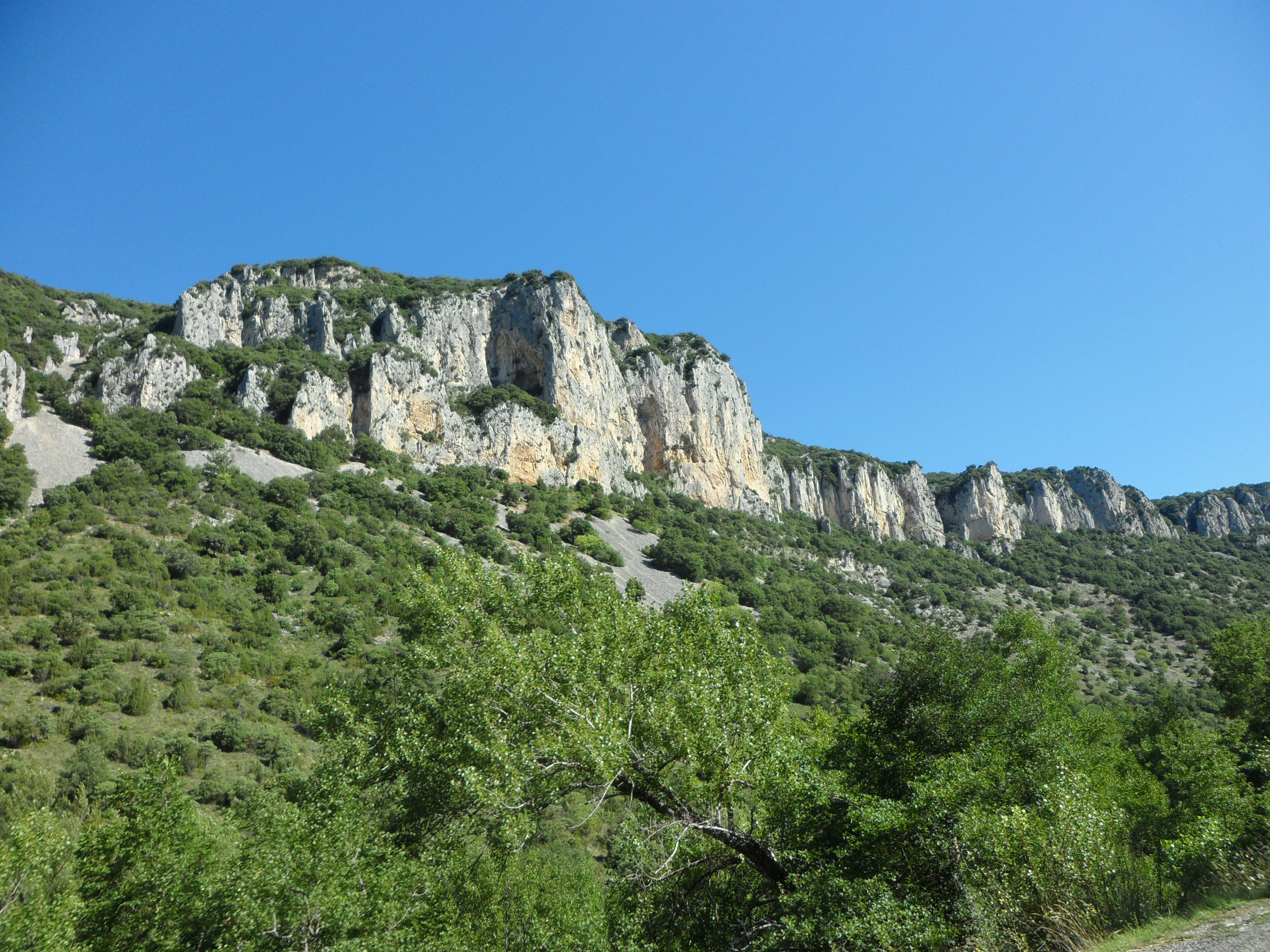
Habitat in Ardeche
