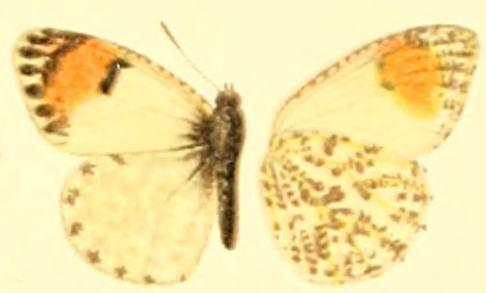

Conservation status
- Apparently Secure (NatureServe)

Scientific classification
- Kingdom: Animalia
- Phylum: Arthropoda
- Class: Insecta
- Order: Lepidoptera
- Family: Pieridae
- Genus: Anthocharis
- Species: A. thoosa

Binomial name
- Anthocharis thoosa (Scudder, 1878)

Synonyms
- Synchloe thoosa Scudder, 1878; Anthocharis sara thoosa (Scudder, 1878)

= Anthocharis thoosa =

Southwestern orangetip

Species of butterfly

Anthocharis thoosa, the southwestern orangetip, is a butterfly which has a range mainly from the American Rocky Mountains down into Mexico. It is a member of the Anthocharis sara complex.
