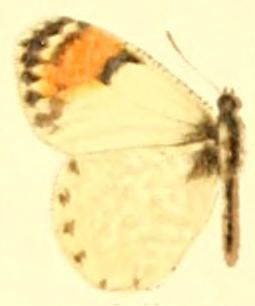

Conservation status
- Secure (NatureServe)

Scientific classification
- Kingdom: Animalia
- Phylum: Arthropoda
- Class: Insecta
- Order: Lepidoptera
- Family: Pieridae
- Genus: Anthocharis
- Species: A. julia

Binomial name
- Anthocharis julia (W.H. Edwards, 1872)

= Anthocharis julia =

Southern Rocky Mountain orangetip

Species of butterfly

Anthocharis julia, also known as the Southern Rocky Mountain Orangetip, is a type of butterfly found in the southern Rocky Mountains on the eastern side of the range. Their caterpillars feed on rock cress (Arabis) species. Adults feed on flower nectar from host plants as well as thistles, fiddleneck, and brodiaeas. Its habitats include forested riparian areas, canyons among foothills, and washes, usually in oak woodland.
