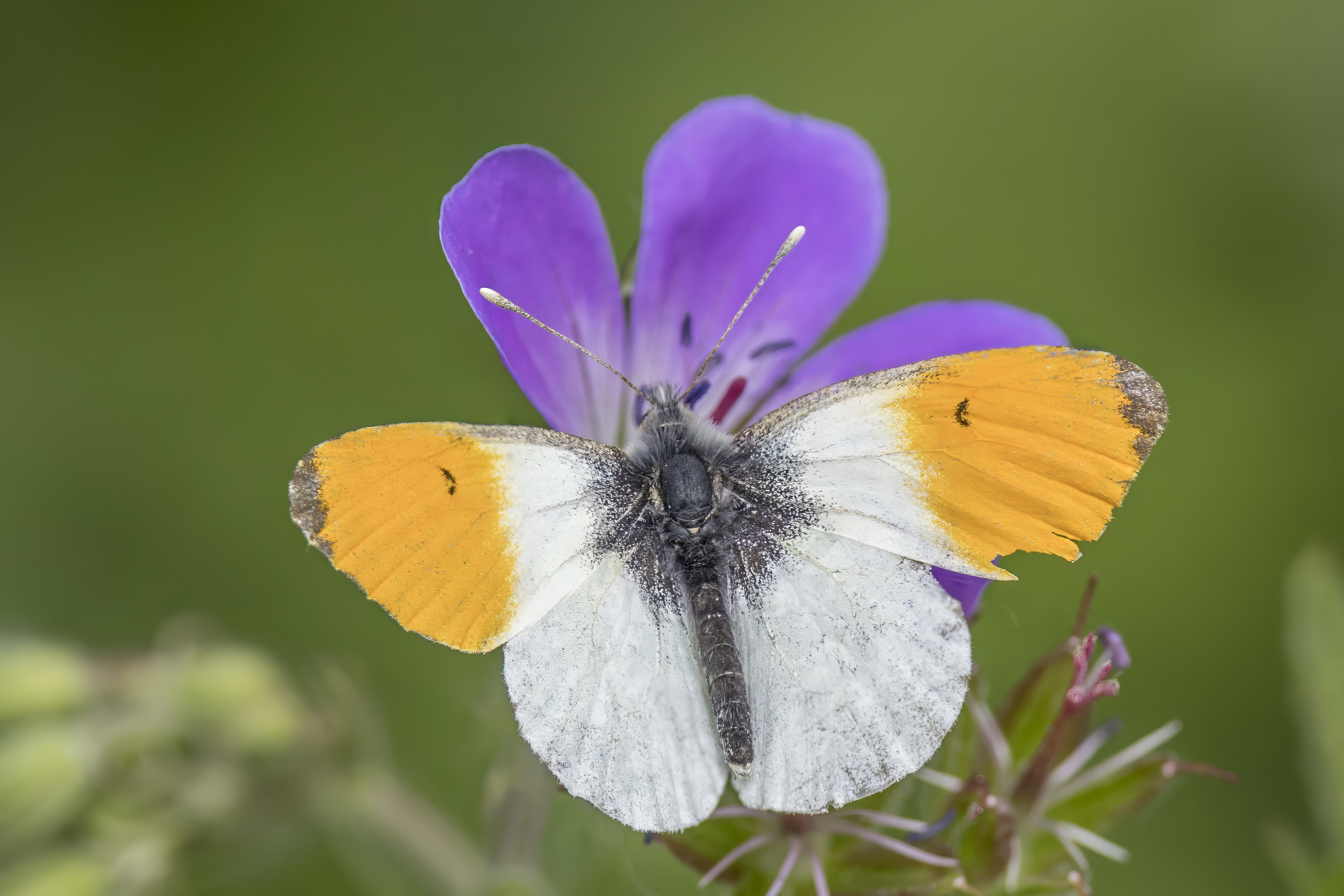
- Male, Geiranger, Norway
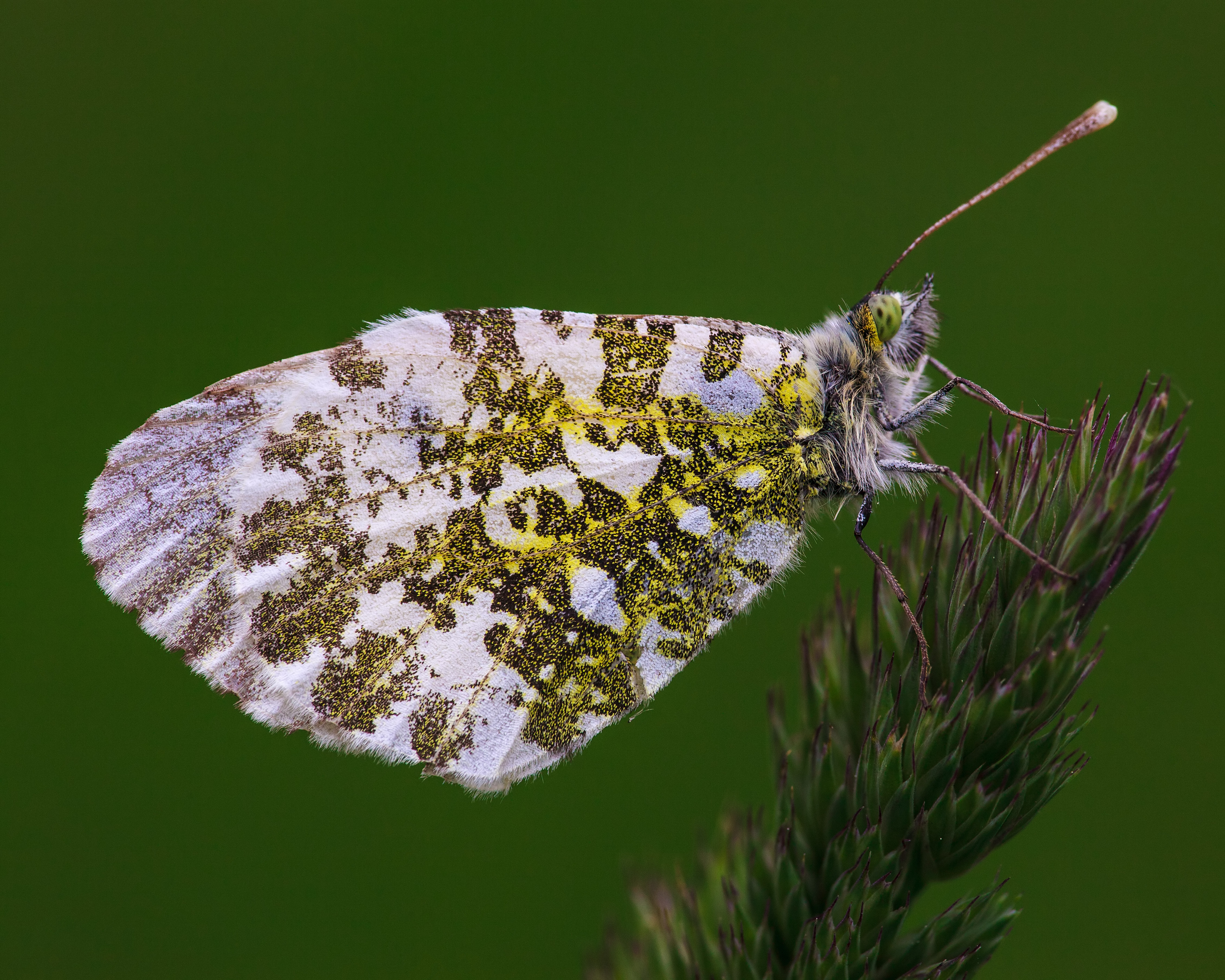
- Female, Rosenfeld, Germany

Conservation status
- Least Concern (IUCN 3.1)

Scientific classification
- Kingdom: Animalia
- Phylum: Arthropoda
- Class: Insecta
- Order: Lepidoptera
- Family: Pieridae
- Genus: Anthocharis
- Species: A. cardamines

Binomial name
- Anthocharis cardamines (Linnaeus, 1758)

Subspecies
- See subspecies

Synonyms
- Euchloë cardamines

= Anthocharis cardamines =

Orange tip

Species of butterfly

Anthocharis cardamines, the orange tip, is a butterfly in the family Pieridae, which contains about 1,100 species. A. cardamines is mainly found throughout Europe and temperate Asia (Palearctic). The males feature wings with a signature orange pigmentation, which is the origin of A. cardamines' common name.

Males and females of this species occupy different habitats: males mostly frequent the edges of forests whereas females frequent meadows. A. cardamines feeds on most plants found within its habitat but the females selectively oviposit on young inflorescence of crucifers.

Mating is usually controlled by females as virgin females found in flight are always pursued by males immediately. Females can signal different meanings to the approaching males by using their abdomen. There is evidence that mated females have an anti-aphrodisiac and that their usage of the abdomen has a closely related function in presenting these pheromones to males.

This species has been affected by changing temperatures, and its first appearance has shifted forward 17.3 days in the Spring.

== Description ==
The common name derives from the bright orange tips of the male's forewings. The males are a common sight in spring, flying along hedgerows and damp meadows in search of the more reclusive female which lacks the orange and is often mistaken for other species of butterfly. The undersides are mottled green and white and create a superb camouflage when settled on flowerheads such as cow parsley and garlic mustard (Alliaria petiolata).

Males display a variation in body size, which is attributed to their host plant. Males reared on C. pratensis become the smaller of the two variants, and those reared on A. petiolata become the larger.

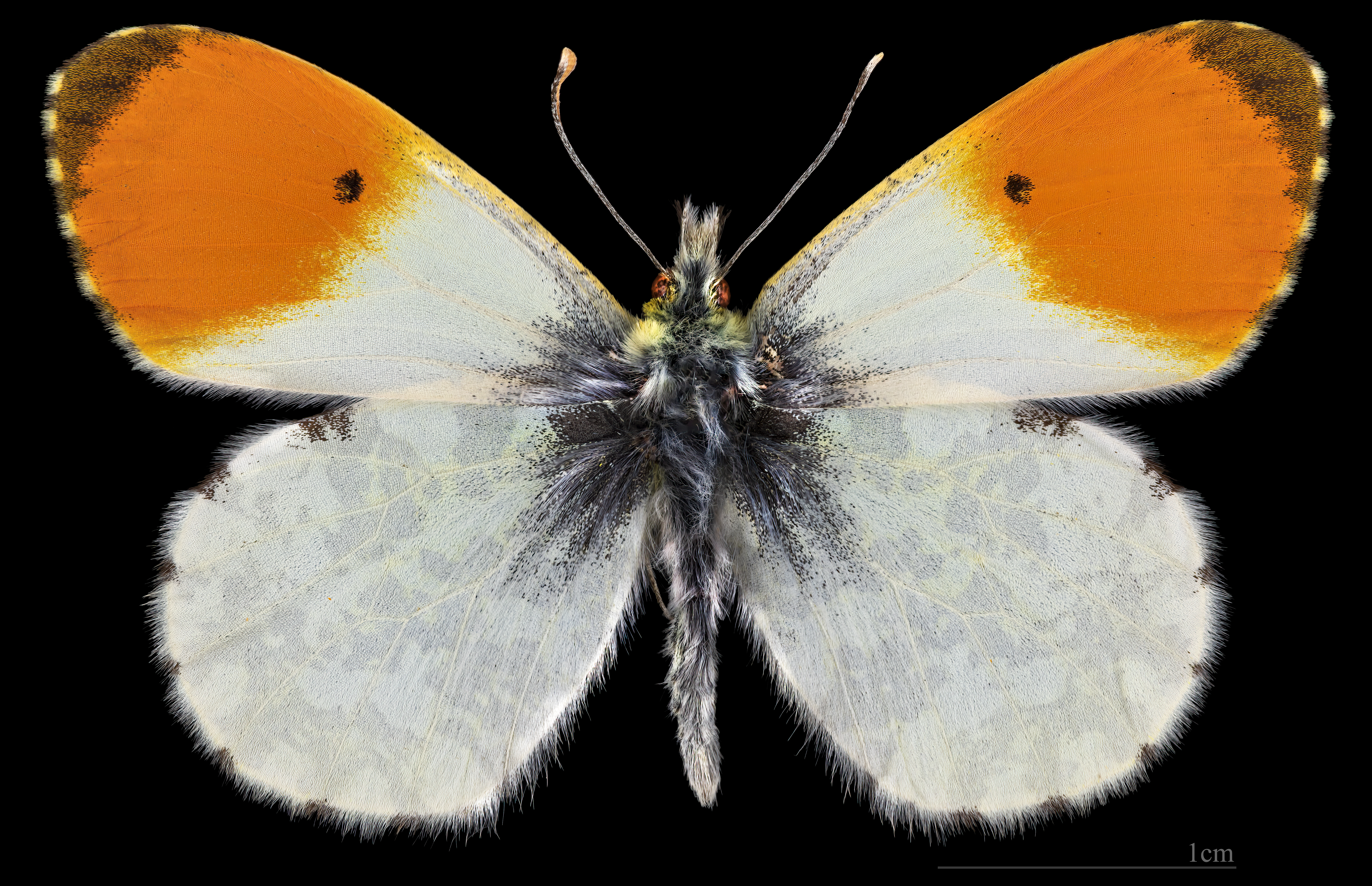
Anthocharis cardamines ♂

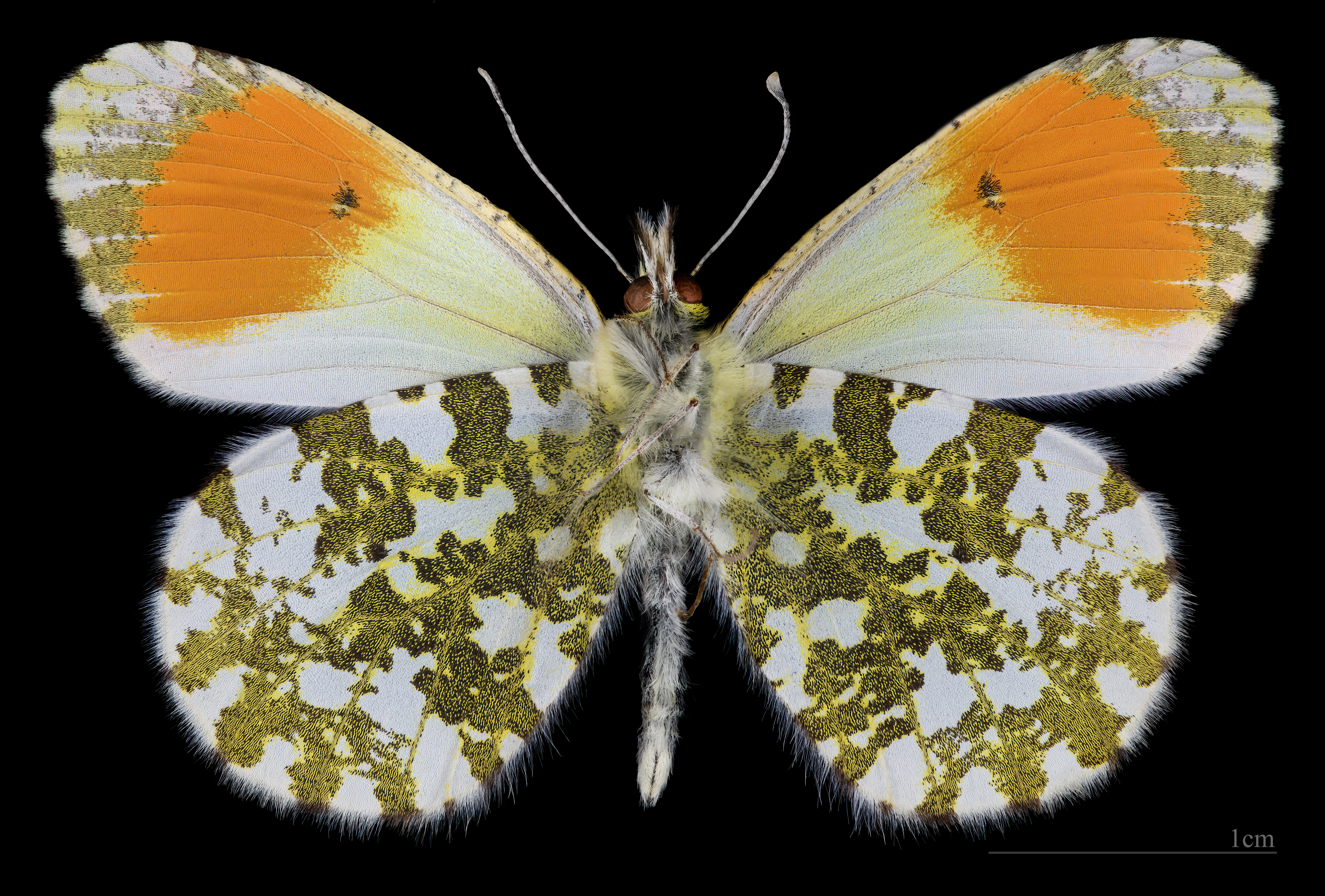
Anthocharis cardamines ♂ △

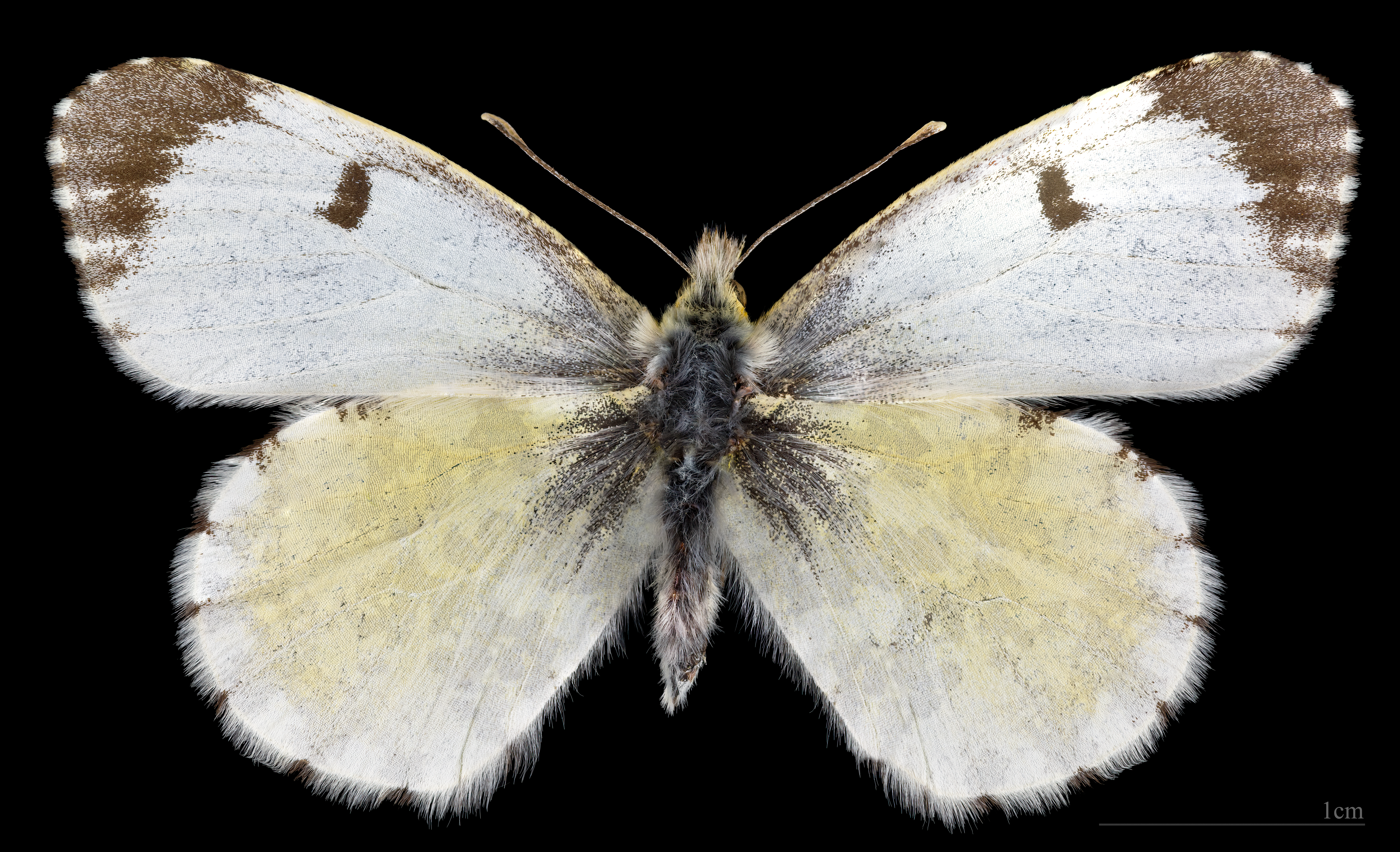
Anthocharis cardamines ♀

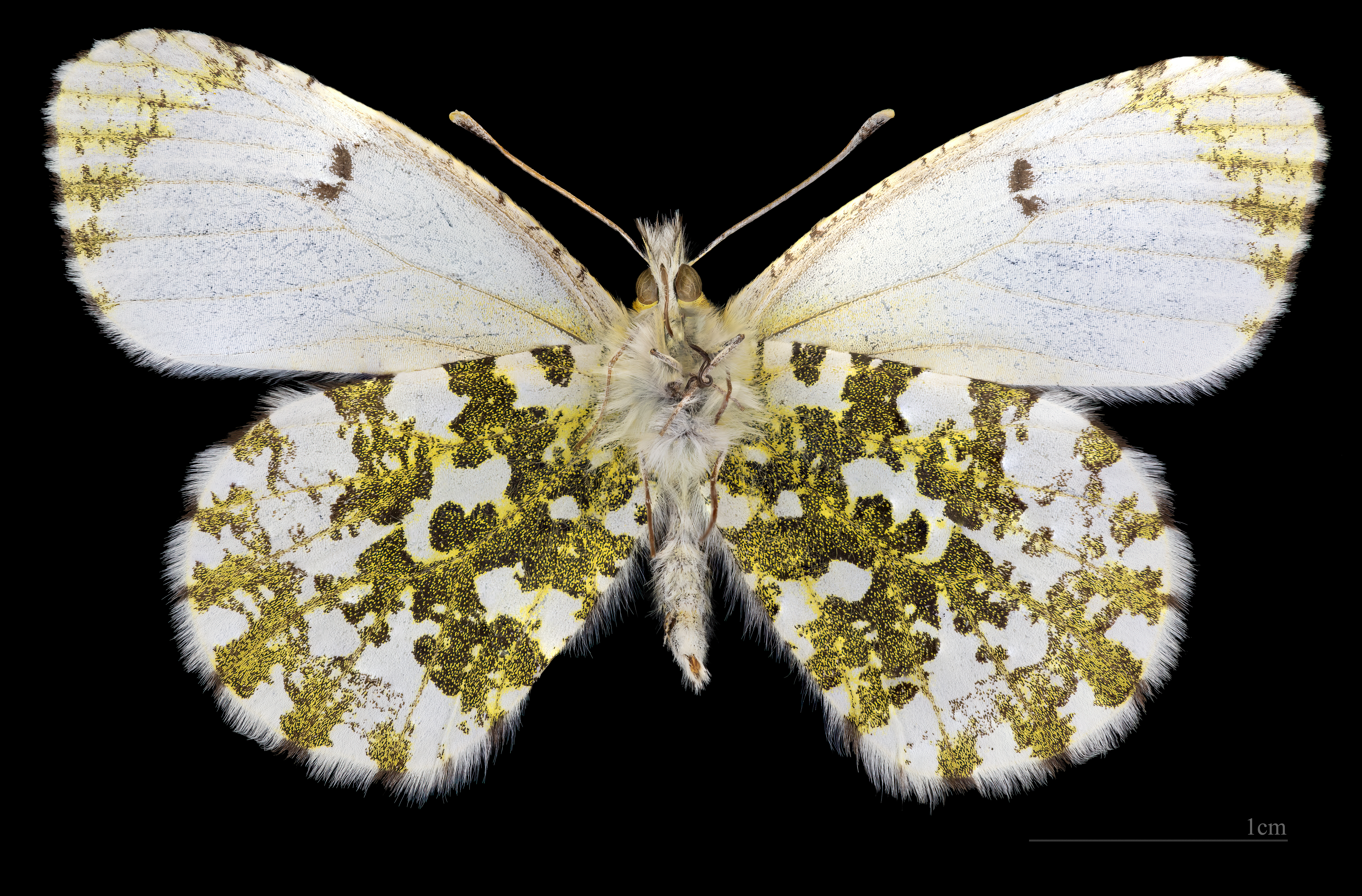
Anthocharis cardamines ♀ △

== Distribution and habitat ==
A. cardamines can be found throughout Europe and across the Palearctic to China.

The habitats of males and females differ significantly. Males are restricted to edges and clearings of forests for their entire lives. On rare occurrences, males will leave forest edges and enter meadows, but this is only to cross and reach another forest edge. They prefer to fly in bright sunlight and avoid areas of shade in the forest. Females are mainly found in open meadows and dry hillocks for a majority of their lives. Females only spend short period of time in forests before re-entering nearby meadows. In Armenia the species inhabits not only forests and woodlands, but also meadows, where males occur together with females.

== Food resources ==
- Lathyrus montanus
- Viola canina
- Viola riviniana
- Geranium robertianum
- Viola tricolor
- Capsella bursa-pastoris
- Lychnis flos-cuculi

Female A. cardamines feed on the flowers listed above, in addition to all species of flowers located in the habitats where their host plants are found. They do not interrupt host plant search to find foraging habitats; instead, they visit available flowers in host plant habitats.

== Parental care ==
=== Oviposition ===
Females will tend to only deposit eggs on crucifers if they are in bloom. Furthermore, they prefer to oviposit on young inflorescences, and there have been instances of A. cardamines that refuse to deposit eggs on inflorescences that had aged. If the stem of the inflorescence is not strong enough to support the weight of the female A. cardamines, they will cease egg laying.

=== Egg guarding ===
Initially, it was believed that the bright orange color of A. cardamines egg deterred further egg laying. However, new studies have discovered another deterrent. To prevent other females from laying eggs on the same flowerhead, female A. cardamines will deposit a pheromone during egg laying. This pheromone will deter other females from also laying an egg on that flower head. Flower heads with more than one egg can still be found because the pheromone is water-soluble and relatively short-lived.

=== Host plant learning and selection ===
When choosing host plants, female A. cardamines only lay eggs on host plants growing in the sun. Those in the shade are completely avoided, and plants partially covered in shade are only selected if the female does not have to travel through shaded areas to reach the plant. Females are extremely selective for host plant size, and larger flower heads are preferred to smaller ones. Even when smaller flower heads are overly abundant, female A. cardamines will completely ignore them in search of larger flower heads. Females will also ignore flower heads already containing a conspecific egg. This is because larva from the already laid eggs will hatch first and cannibalize any other present eggs.

== Life history ==
=== Life cycle ===
==== Egg ====
Eggs of A. cardamines are always deposited on inflorescences of crucifers. When first laid, eggs are white in colour and eventually change to orange and then brown after a few days. Eggs are covered with a pheromone that deters other females from ovipositing on the same crucifer.

==== Larva ====
When hatched, the larva consumes its egg shell before eating the seed pods of its host plant. The fully grown larva leaves the food plant after its five larval instars and pupates on lower vegetation. If more than one egg had been laid on the same host plant, then the larva to first hatch will cannibalize its sibling. This is the major reason why Orange tip females avoid eggs laying on the same crucifer.

==== Pupa ====
While the earlier stages of A. cardamines are easy to find since most individuals develop on a single plant, the pupa is very difficult to locate.

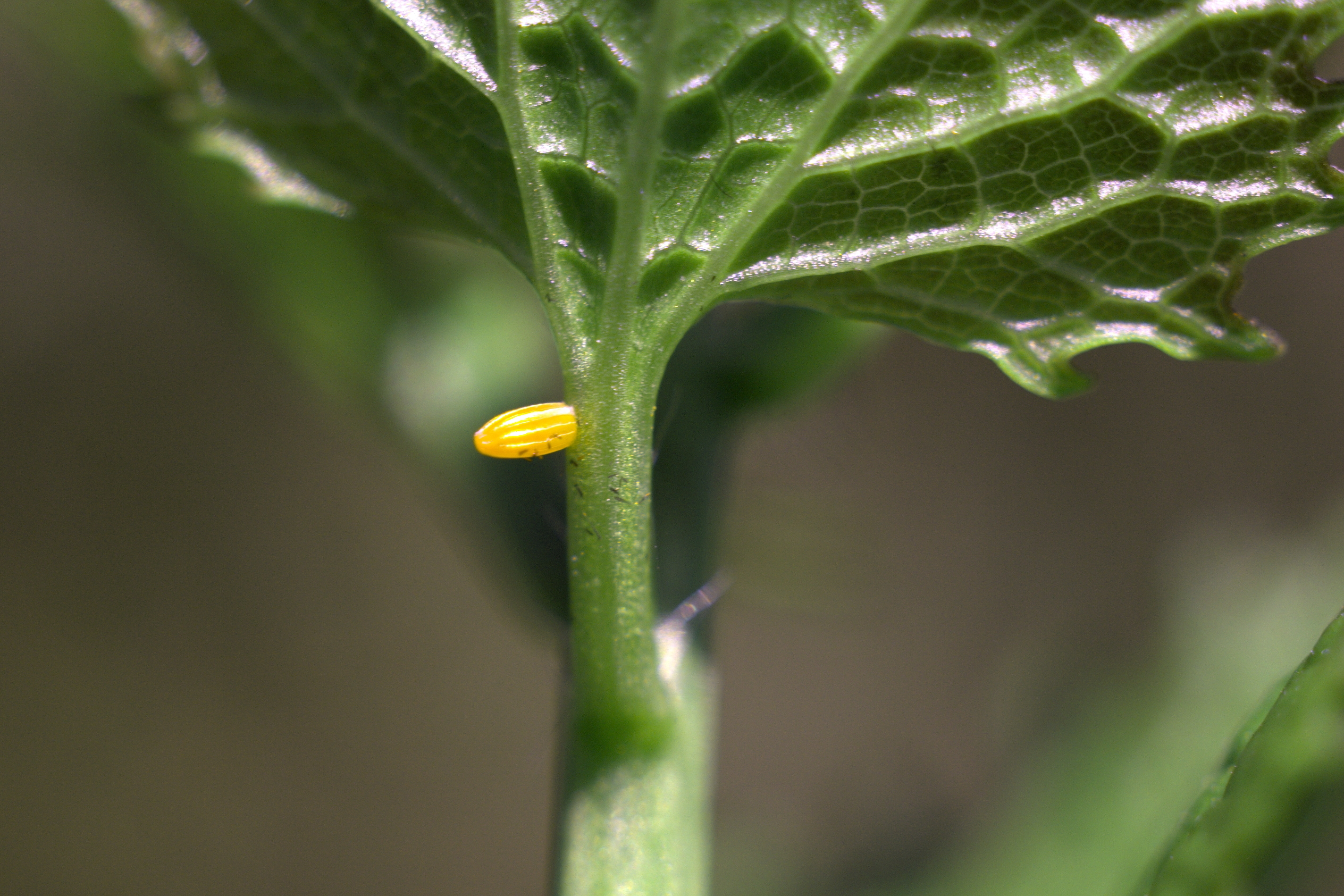
Egg

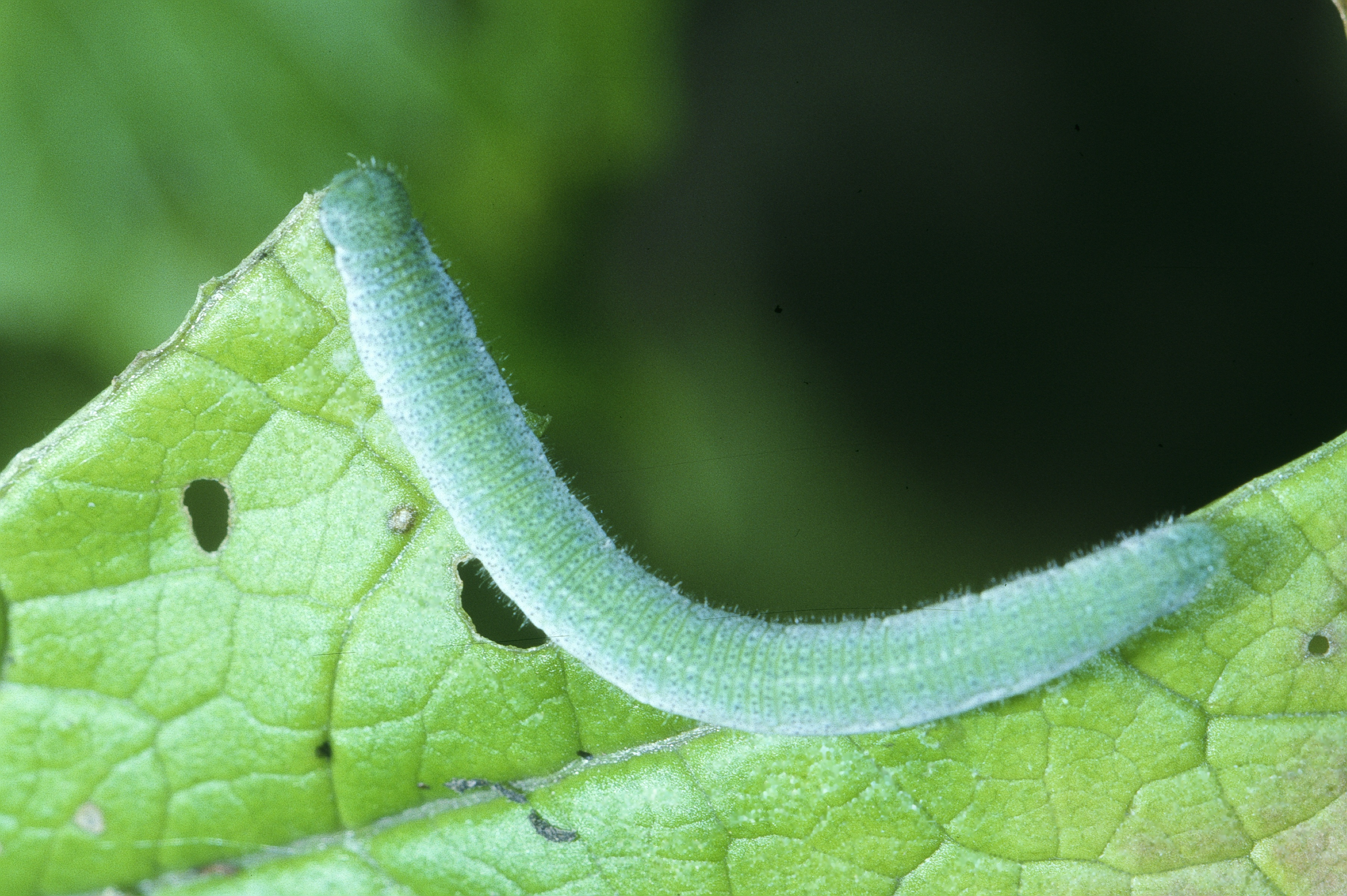
Larva

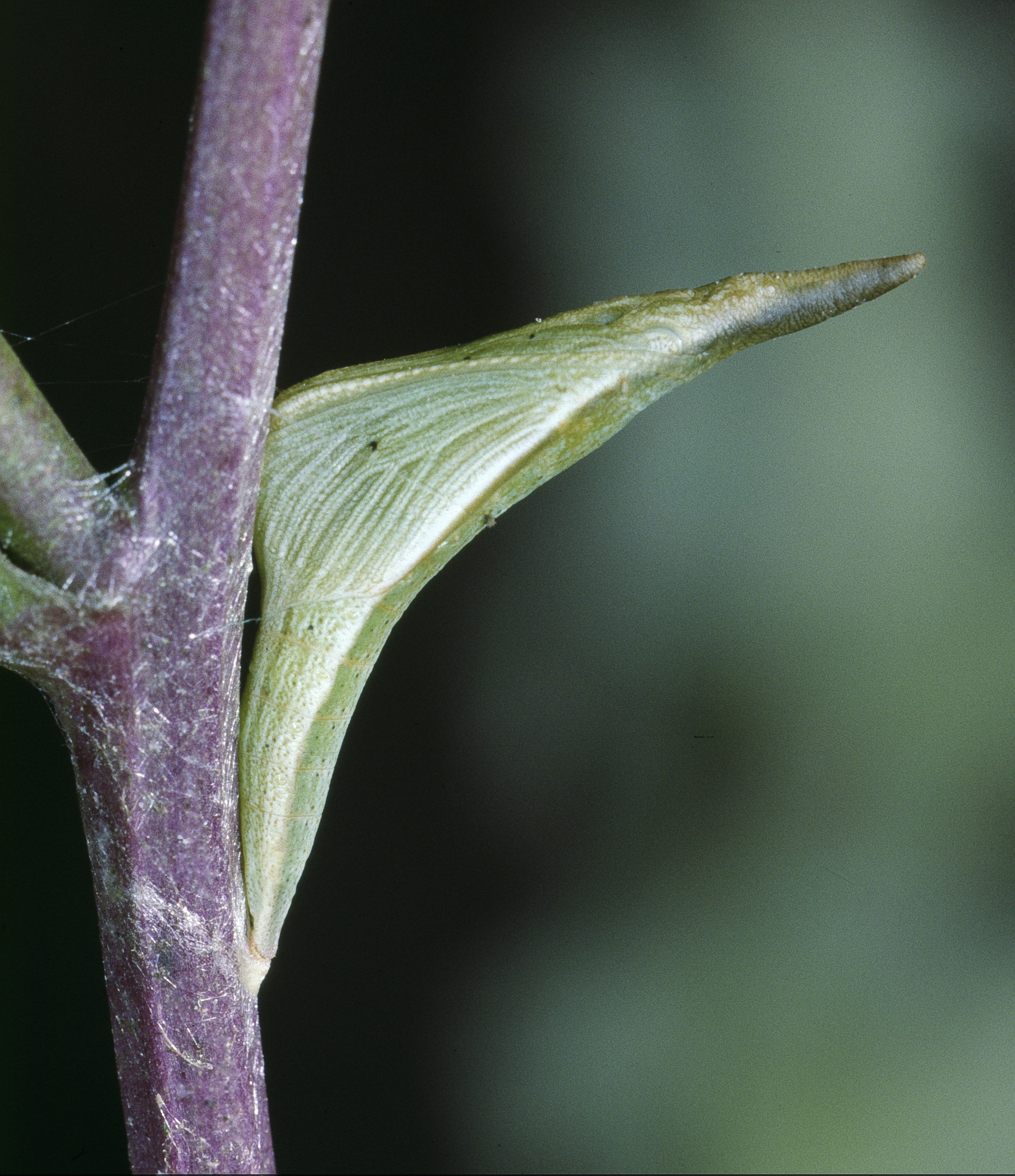
Pupa

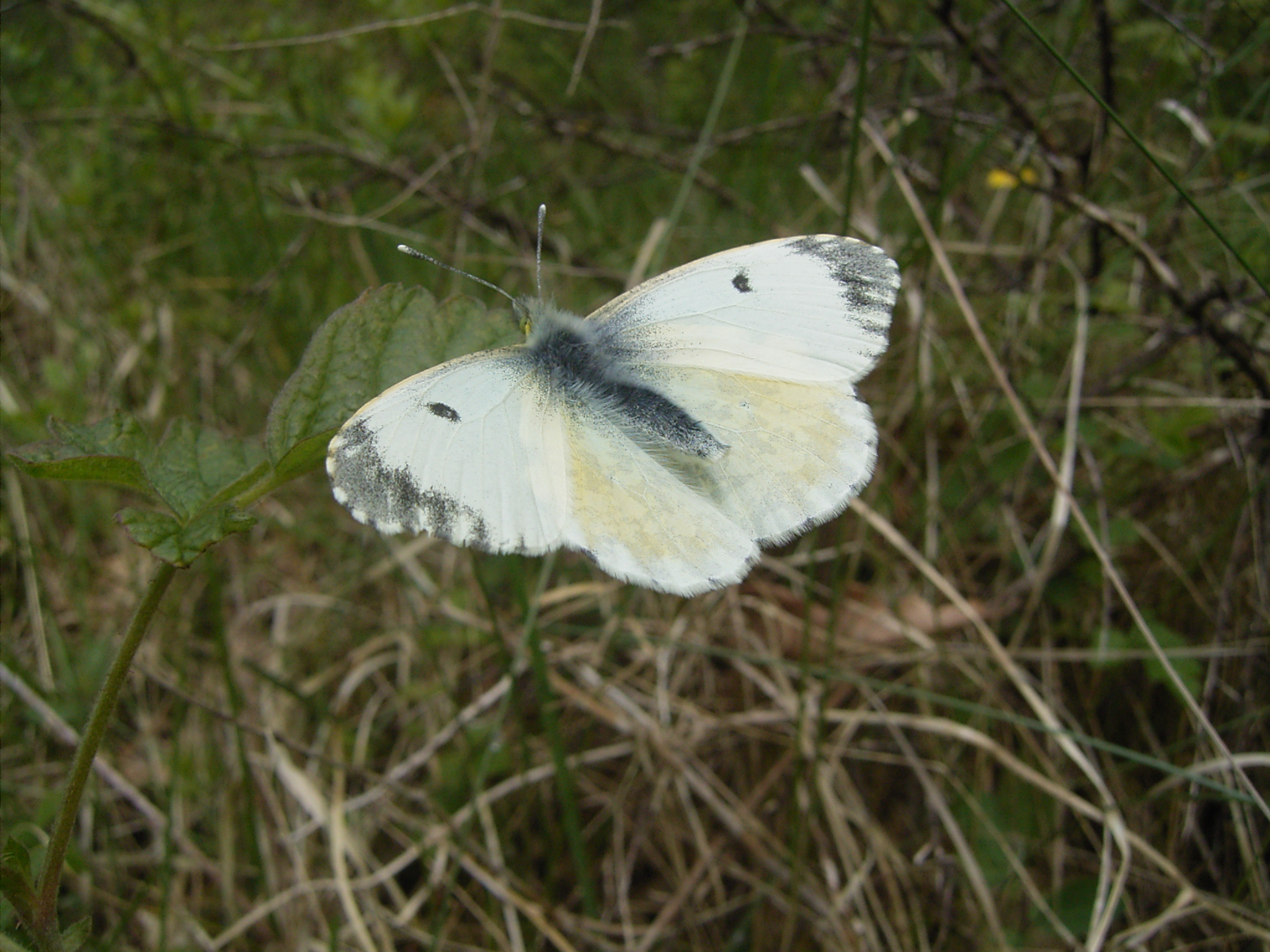
Female imago

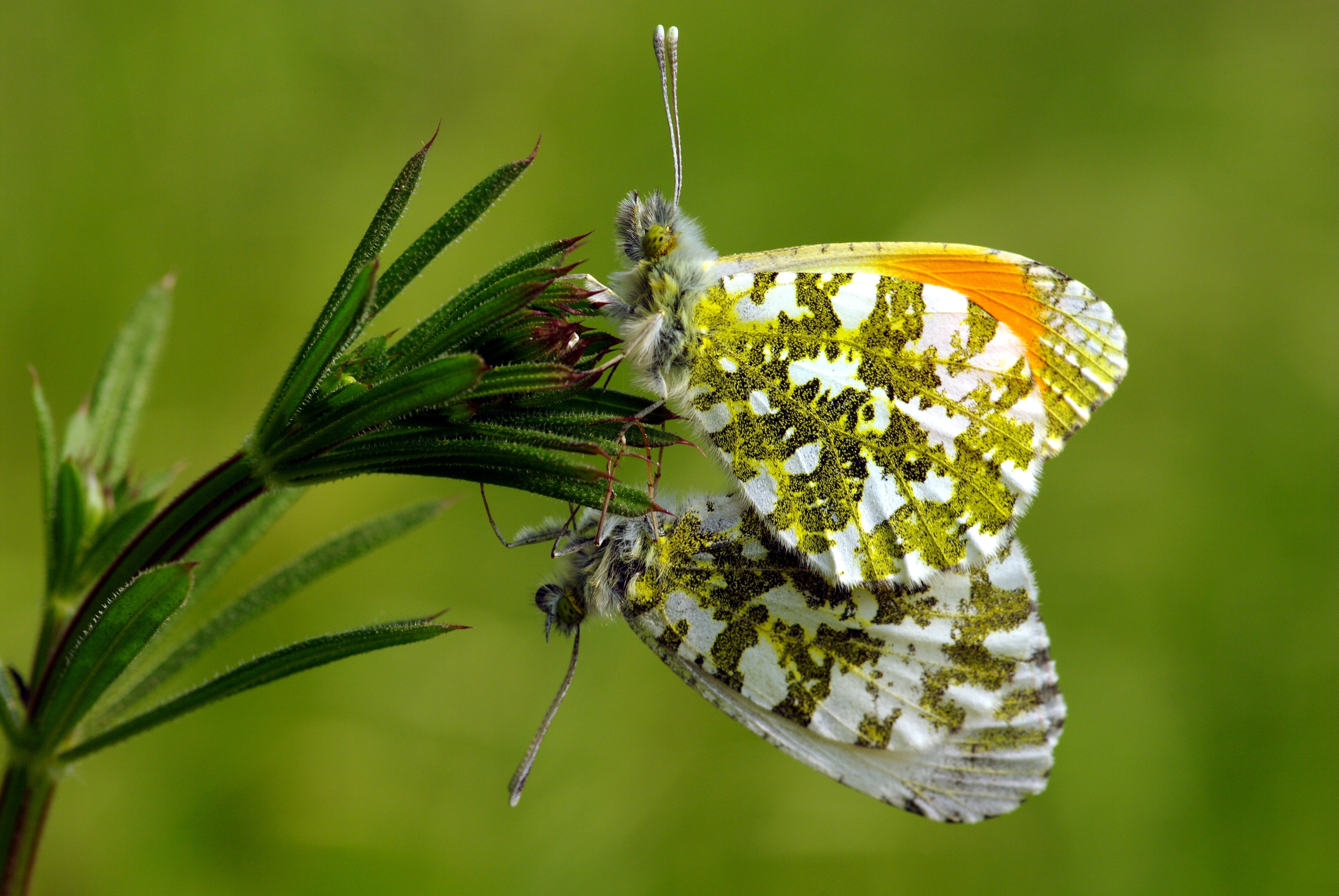
Mating, showing disruptively coloured underside

== Migration ==
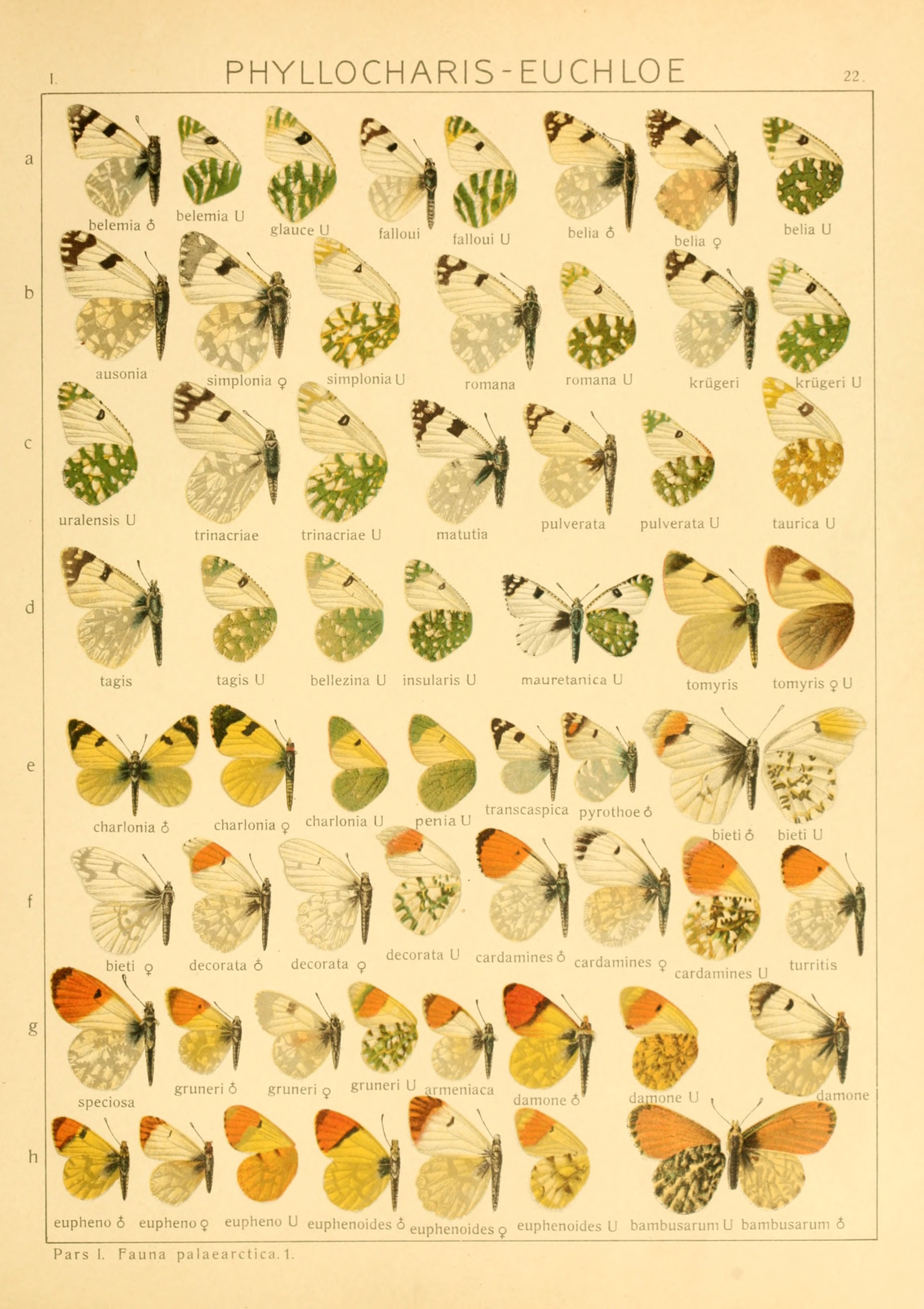
Anthocharis in Seitz

=== Regional dispersal ===
In Britain, there have been patterns found relating weather and A. cardamines appearances. From data collected from 1976 to 1998, spring and summer temperatures were found to have increased by approximately 1 degree Celsius. This has affected first appearance of A. cardamines, which has advanced by 17.3 days with the increasing temperature. The increased temperature has also been to connected to increases in duration of flight period of A.cardamines in Britain.

== Enemies ==
=== Predation ===
Corpses of A. cardamines caterpillars are often found with darkening around a wound near the tail. These injuries are consistent with damage inflicted by spiders, which are their main predators.

The host plants of A. cardamines are often grazed by Muntjac deer. The deer favor plants with young flowers, which corresponds to the preferred plants of A. cardamines for egg laying. As a result, Muntjac deer are responsible for consuming up to nineteen percent of A. cardamines young through indirect predation.

== Mating ==
=== Courting ===
The result of male courting depends heavily on the location of the female when courted. Females found in flight are immediately pursued by males, and the encounter almost always results in acceptance of the male mating attempt. When males encounter females already perched on vegetation, their mating attempts are usually met by a raised abdomen.

Both mated and virgin females respond to males with a raised abdomen, but the signals take different meanings. When a male encounters a mated female with a raised abdomen, it is taken as a signal of rejection, and he quickly leaves. When virgin females raise their abdomen, the signal takes on a male detention function instead of rejection. Males will continue to court a perched, virgin female with a raised abdomen until she acquiesces or flees.

=== Pheromone ===
While a specific pheromone has not been identified in A. cardamines, since both the rejection signal and detention signal in females are visually identical scientists hypothesize that a chemical signal distinguish the two. Mated females tend to track the males with their abdomens during the courting attempt, and this is behavioral evidence that mated females have an anti-aphrodisiac, and that the raised abdomen presents the pheromone as close as possible to the male.

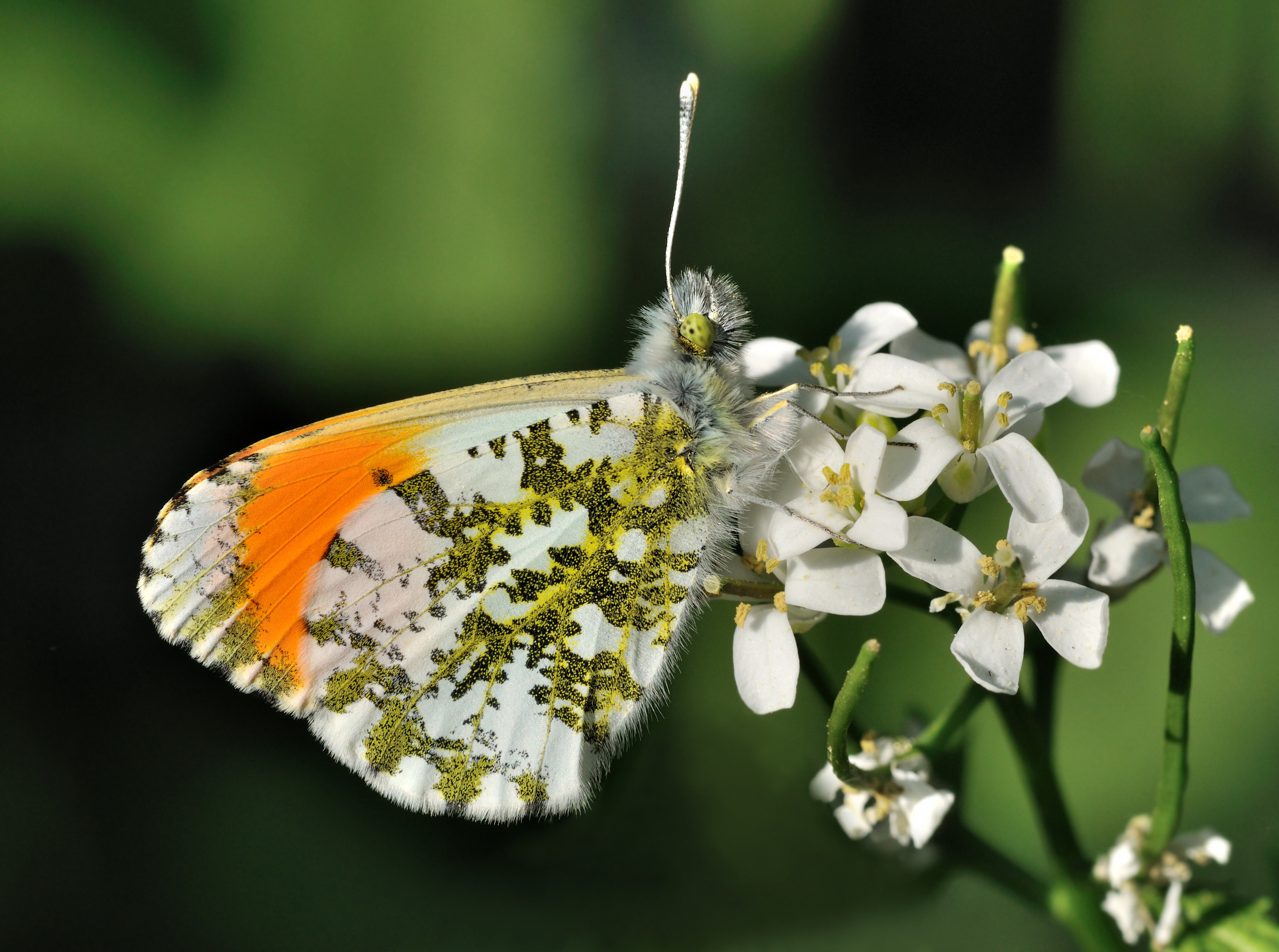
Side view of a male on garlic mustard (Alliaria petiolata) in Ahlen, Germany

== Subspecies ==
- A. c. cardamines (Linnaeus, 1758) – In the male of the name-typical cardamines the orange-red apical patch does not reach much further than to the black discocellular spot, the rest of the upperside being white with the exception of the narrowly lack apical margin, the proximal area of the forewing beneath and the underside of the hindwing being likewise white, the latter with greenish ("parsley") markings, which are rather variable in extent. In the female the orange-red apical patch is wanting, but the black apical marking is much wider and the black discocellular spot larger, otherwise the female similar to the male.
- A. c. meridionalis (Verity, 1908)
- A. c. phoenissa (Kalchberg 1805)
- A. c. alexandra (Hemming, 1933) – Found in the mountain ridges of Northern Tian-Shan at elevations of 1200–2700 m. Flight period is April–July.
- A. c. isshikii – Distinct spot found both in pupae and adults and found in Japan.

== See also ==
- List of butterflies of Great Britain
