= List of butterflies of Europe (Pieridae) =

This is a list of the butterflies of family Pieridae, or the "whites", which are found in Europe. It is a part of List of the butterflies of Europe.

== Pieridae – whites ==
Subfamily Dismorphiinae

- Wood white, Leptidea sinapis (Linnaeus, 1758)
- Réal's wood white, Leptidea reali Reissinger, 1989
- Leptidea juvernica Williams, 1946
- Fenton's wood white, Leptidea morsei (Fenton, 1881)
- Eastern wood white, Leptidea duponcheli (Staudinger, 1871)

Subfamily Coliadinae

- Berger's clouded yellow, Colias alfacariensis Ribbe, 1805
- Clouded yellow, Colias croceus (Fourcroy, 1785)
- Northern clouded yellow, Colias hecla Lefèbvre, 1836
- Pale clouded yellow, Colias hyale (Linnaeus, 1758)
- Eastern pale clouded yellow, Colias erate (Esper, 1805)
- Pale Arctic clouded yellow, Colias palaeno (Linnaeus, 1761)
- Mountain clouded yellow, Colias phicomone (Esper, 1780)
- Greek clouded yellow, Colias aurorina Herrich-Schäffer, 1850
- Lesser clouded yellow, Colias chrysotheme Esper, 1781
- Booth's sulphur, Colias tyche (de Böber, 1812)
- Balkan clouded yellow, Colias caucasica Staudinger, 1871
- Danube clouded yellow, Colias myrmidone Esper, 1780
- African migrant, Catopsilia florella (Fabricius, 1775)
- Cleopatra, Gonepteryx cleopatra (Linnaeus, 1767)
- Common brimstone, Gonepteryx rhamni (Linnaeus, 1758)
- Powdered brimstone, Gonepteryx farinosa (Zeller, 1847)
- Canary Island brimstone, Gonepteryx cleobule (Hübner, 1824) Endemic to Canary Islands
- Gonepteryx eversi Rehnelt, 1974 Endemic to Canary Islands

Subfamily Pierinae

- Orange tip, Anthocharis cardamines (Linnaeus 1758)
- Eastern orange tip, Anthocharis damone Boisduval, 1836
- Provence orange tip, Anthocharis euphenoides Staudinger, 1869
- Grüner's orange tip, Anthocharis gruneri (Herrich-Schäffer, 1851)
- Black-veined white, Aporia crataegi (Linnaeus, 1758)
- Small orange tip, Colotis evagore (Klug, 1829)
- Eastern dappled white, Euchloe ausonia (Hübner, 1804)
- Western dappled white, Euchloe crameri Butler, 1869
- Portuguese dappled white, Euchloe tagis (Hübner, 1804)
- Corsican dappled white, Euchloe insularis (Staudinger, 1861) Endemic to Corsica and Sardinia
- Greenish black-tip, Euchloe charlonia (Donzel, 1842)
- Spanish greenish black-tip, Euchloe bazae Fabiano, 1993 Endemic to Spain
- Eastern greenish black-tip, Euchloe penia (Freyer, 1805)
- Green-striped white, Euchloe belemia (Esper, 1800)
- Mountain dappled white, Euchloe simplonia (Boisduval, 1878)
- Large white, Pieris brassicae (Linnaeus, 1758)
- Canary Islands large white, Pieris cheiranthi (Hübner, 1808)
- Dark-veined white, Pieris bryoniae (Hübner, 1806)
- Mountain small white, Pieris ergane (Geyer, 1828)
- Southern small white, Pieris mannii (Mayer, 1851)
- Green-veined white, Pieris napi (Linnaeus, 1758)
- Small white, Pieris rapae (Linnaeus, 1758)
- Krueper's small white, Pieris krueperi Staudinger, 1860
- Lofty Bath white, Pontia callidice (Hübner, 1806)
- Bath white, Pontia daplidice (Linnaeus, 1758)
- Eastern Bath white, Pontia edusa (Fabricius, 1777)
- Lesser Bath white, Pontia chloridice (Hübner, 1813)
- Sooty orange tip, Zegris eupheme (Esper, 1805)

== See also ==
- List of butterflies of Europe (Nymphalidae)
