= Euchloe ausonia dephalis =

Pearl white

Scientific classification
- Kingdom: Animalia
- Phylum: Arthropoda
- Clade: Pancrustacea
- Class: Insecta
- Order: Lepidoptera
- Family: Pieridae
- Genus: Euchloe
- Species: E. ausonia
- Subspecies: E. a. dephalis

Trinomial name
- Euchloe ausonia dephalis Hübner 1803

Subspecies of butterfly

Euchloe ausonia dephalis, the pearl white, is a small butterfly of the family Pieridae, that is, the yellows and whites, which is found in India. It is a subspecies of the eastern dappled white (Euchloe ausonia).

== See also ==
- Pieridae
- List of butterflies of India (Pieridae)
