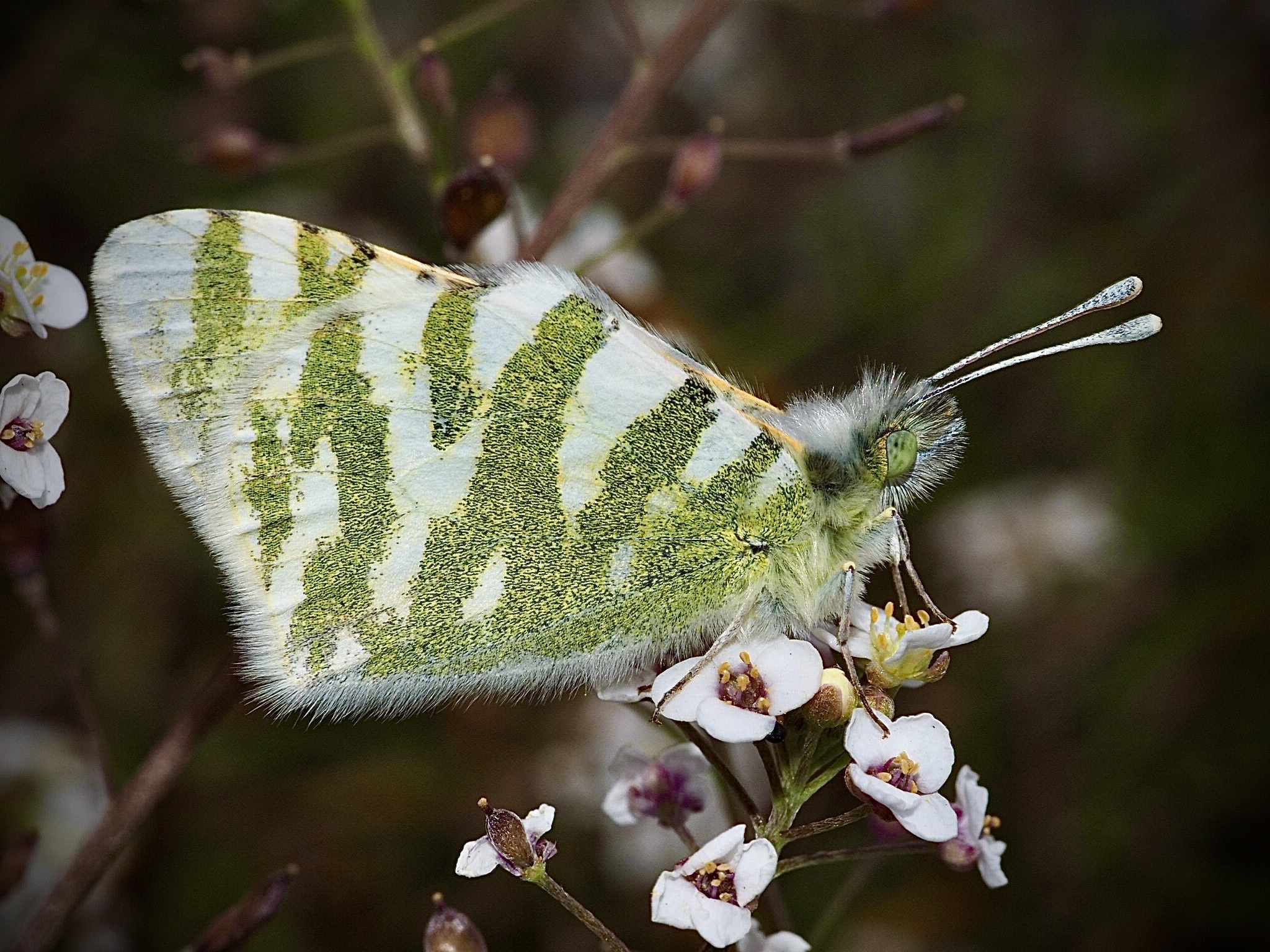

Scientific classification
- Kingdom: Animalia
- Phylum: Arthropoda
- Class: Insecta
- Order: Lepidoptera
- Family: Pieridae
- Genus: Euchloe
- Species: E. grancanariensis

Binomial name
- Euchloe grancanariensis Acosta, 2008

Synonyms
- Euchloe constantini Back, 2008

= Euchloe grancanariensis =

Species of butterfly

Euchloes grancanariensis is a species of butterfly in the family Pieridae. It is endemic to Gran Canaria in the Canary Islands.
