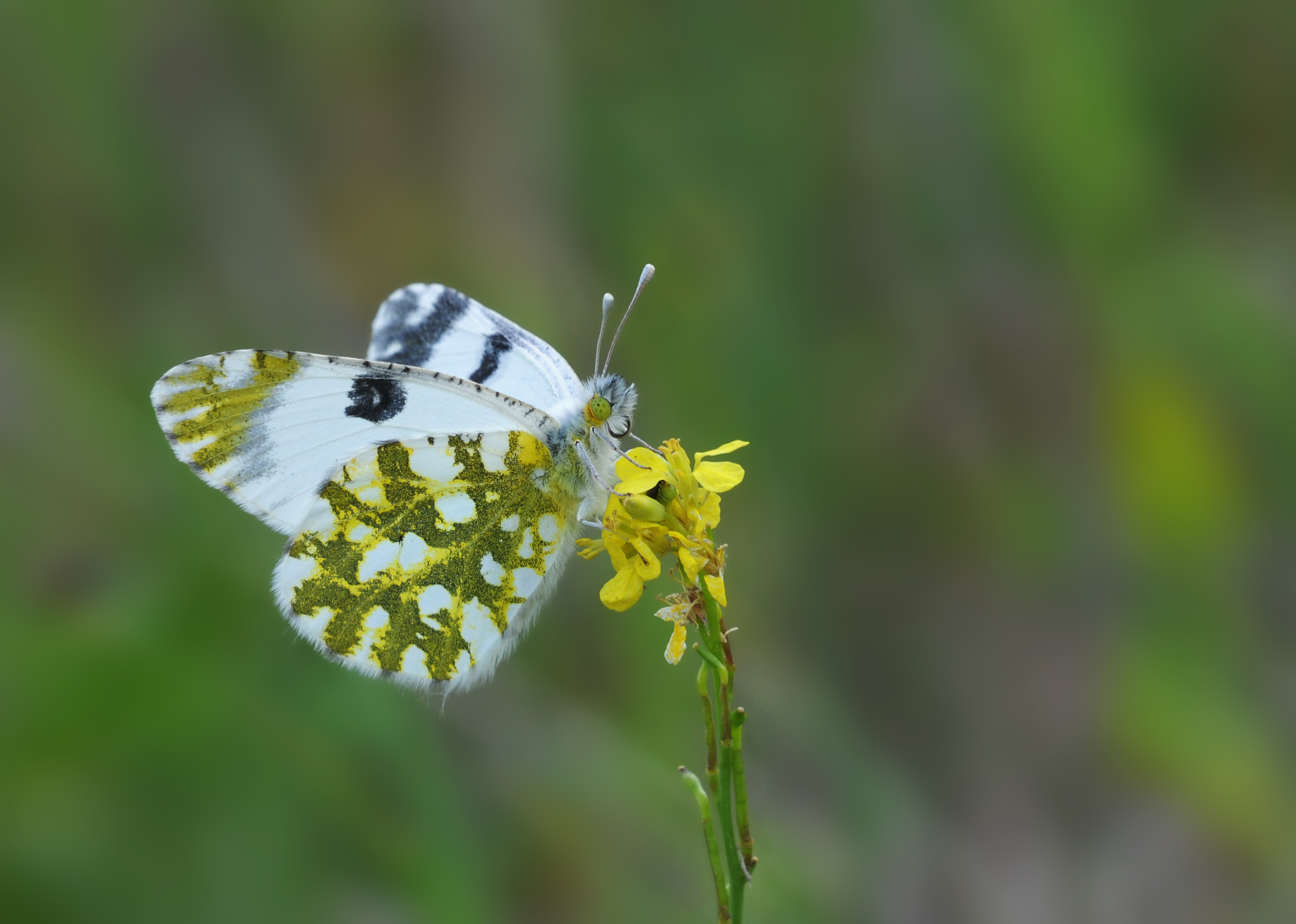

Scientific classification
- Kingdom: Animalia
- Phylum: Arthropoda
- Class: Insecta
- Order: Lepidoptera
- Family: Pieridae
- Genus: Euchloe
- Species: E. ausonia

Binomial name
- Euchloe ausonia (Hubner, 1805)

= Euchloe ausonia =

Eastern dappled white

Species of butterfly

Euchloe ausonia, the eastern dappled white, is a southern European and Palearctic butterfly found mostly to the south and east of its almost indistinguishable relative the western dappled white.

== Description ==
The wingspan is 36–48 mm. The forewings are white with black tips and a black spot. The underside is characterized by black and yellow scales, which create a greenish-white pattern. The female is generally darker. The two generations differ in pattern. The colour of the caterpillar varies from yellowish to greenish to bluish. It has obvious side stripes. The dorsal line and the dorsal side line are darker than the base colour. The segments have numerous, very small, black dots. The pupa is light brown and relatively slim.

== Distribution and habitat ==
Euchloe ausonia occurs in Europe in central and southern Italy as well as in the Balkan Peninsula including most of the larger, Greek islands. The northern border in Europe runs through southern Austria, Hungary and southern Ukraine. In the east, the presence in the south continues to Israel and Jordan and in the east to northern Iraq, Iran and Afghanistan, to the north via the Caucasus up to southern Kazakhstan and across the Palearctic to Tian Shan, Altai and Tibet. The species prefers rocky slopes, rocky meadows, abandoned or neglected cultivated land, open olive groves, roadsides, mountain meadows and also forest edges up to 2000 m above sea level. In the habitat nectar plants, particularly cruciferous must be common as well as, of course, the caterpillar food plants.

== Biology ==
The larvae feed on the flowers and young fruits of Sinapis arvensis, Isatis tinctoria, Isatis glauca, Aethionema saxatile, Iberis sempervirens, Biscutella mollis, Biscutella laevigata, Bunias erucago and Aurinia saxatilis. They go to an altitude of 1600 m. In most of its range, there are two generations. Adults are on wing from the beginning of March to the beginning of July. In mountainous and very dry areas, there is only one generation.

== Systematics and subspecies ==
The three species Euchloe ausonia, Euchloe crameri and Euchloe simplonia are closely related. Many authors refer to these species as the Euchloe ausonia-complex, -superspecies or -species group. Sometimes Euchloe naina is also added to this group, but crossbreeding experiments suggest it may be a subspecies of Euchloe simplonia. Because of these taxonomic problems older literature often refers to a very different geographical distribution and also the number of subspecies is not certain. The following subspecies are listed:

- Euchloe ausonia maxima Verity, 1925 (Crimea)
- Euchloe ausonia graeca (Verity, 1925) (Greece, southern Siberia)
- Euchloe ausonia pulverata (Christoph, 1884) (Tien Shan)
- Euchloe ausonia volgensis Krulikovsky, 1897 (southern Russia)
- Euchloe ausonia melisande Frühstorfer, 1908 (Jordan)
- Euchloe ausonia irinia Dubatolov & Kosterin, 1994 (Kazakhstan)

== Similar species ==
The species can be confused in its distribution area only with a few species. In Tuscany, the distribution area overlaps with Euchloe tagis or with the subspecies Euchloe tagis calvensis. This species is smaller on average. The black colouring of the rather large discoidal spot spreads into the forewing cell. The anal angle of the hind wing is smaller than in E. ausonia. In addition E. ausonia is sympatric with Euchloe crameri in Liguria. In this species, the outer margin of the forewing is slightly concave, in E. ausonia it is slightly convex to almost straight. However, a reliable distinction is hardly possible due to the variability of the two generations.
