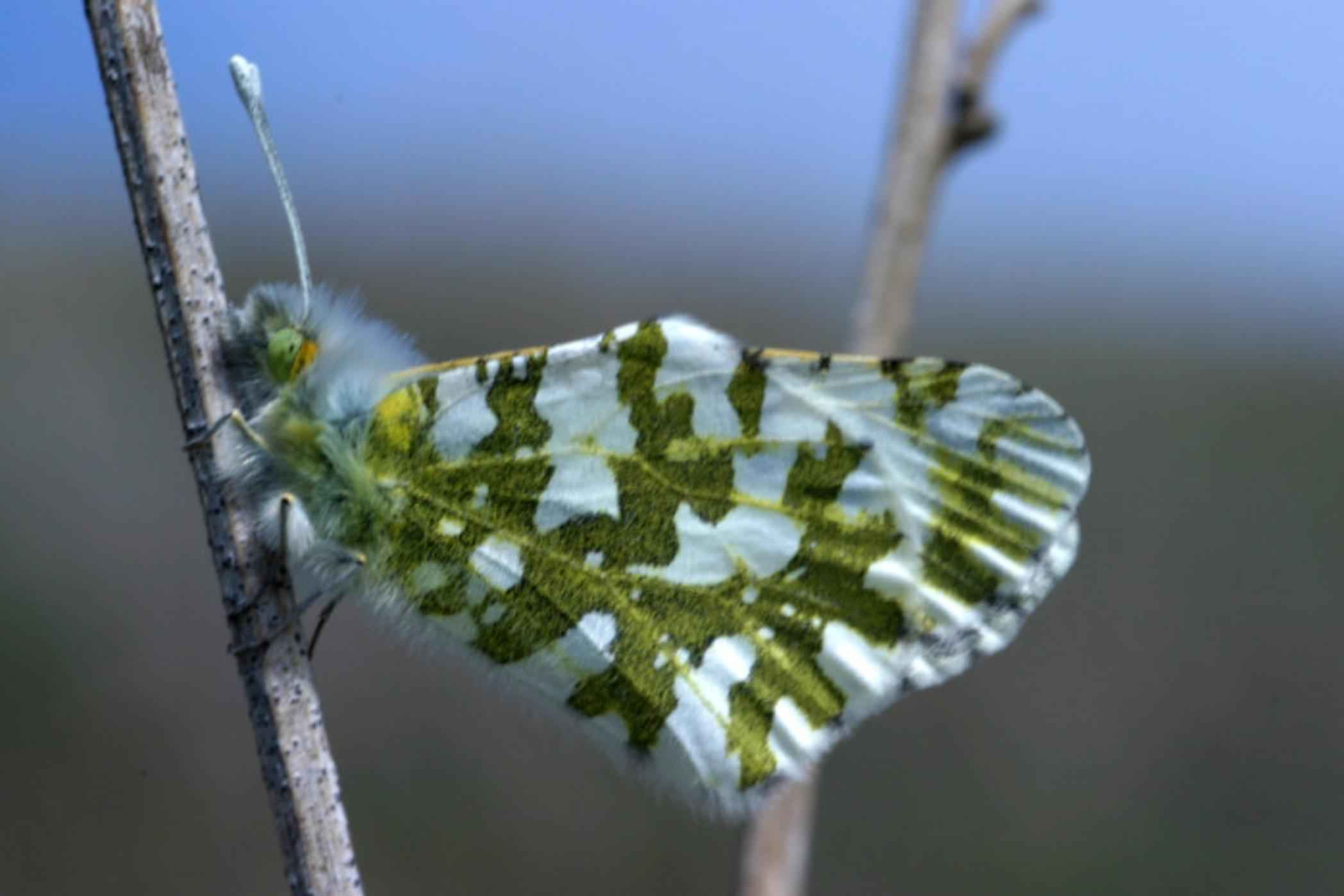

Conservation status
- Endangered (ESA)

Scientific classification
- Kingdom: Animalia
- Phylum: Arthropoda
- Clade: Pancrustacea
- Class: Insecta
- Order: Lepidoptera
- Family: Pieridae
- Genus: Euchloe
- Species: E. ausonides
- Subspecies: E. a. insulanus

Trinomial name
- Euchloe ausonides insulanus Guppy & Shepard, 2001

= Euchloe ausonides insulana =

Island marble butterfly

Subspecies of butterfly

Euchloe ausonides insulanus, the island marble butterfly, is a subspecies of the Euchloe ausonides (large marble butterfly) and is found in the San Juan Islands in Washington in the northwestern United States. The butterfly was thought to be extinct and was last observed on Gabriola Island, British Columbia in 1908. The species was rediscovered during a prairie butterfly survey in San Juan Island National Historical Park in 1998. After this rediscovery, surveys were conducted throughout the presumed range and found a few populations on San Juan Island and Lopez Island, but no remaining populations in Canada.

== Description ==
The Island Marble is medium sized butterfly that is distinguishable by its white and green mottled pattern under its hind wings.

== Habitat ==
The Island Marble butterfly is primarily coastal prairie dwelling species and an indicator for the health of the prairie ecosystem. This species has three known host plants which are located in different ecosystems. Brassica rapa grows primarily in the prairies, Sisymbrium altissium grows in sandy habitats, and Lepidium virginicum grows in coastal areas. Previously, the Island Marble Butterly inhabited various areas in the San Juan and Lopez islands. However, it is currently only found in the American Camp site at San Juan Island National Historical Park.

== Ecology ==
The Island Marble Butterfly spends on average 7 days in its butterfly stage. During this time the butterfly finds a mate, nectars, and lays eggs on a host plant. There are three known host plants for the Island Marble Butterfly: Brassica rapa, Sisymbrium altissimum, and Lepidium virginicum var. menziesii. The lifespan of an Island Marble Butterfly ranges from six to nine days.

== Status ==
On May 5, 2020, the Island Marble butterfly was listed as endangered under the Endangered Species Act of 1973. The Canadian Species at Risk Act (SARA) listed the island marble butterfly as being extirpated in Canada in May 2000 and again in April 2010. On August 22, 2012, the Xerces Society for Invertebrate Conservation submitted a petition for protection with the US Fish and Wildlife Service (USFWS). The island marble butterfly is currently noted on the Washington State Species of Concern List.

The Island Marble Butterflies still have a chance as according to Naturalist Briony Penn, while these butterflies reside on islands, they still have a chance as islands may form as a type of shelter where the butterflies can repopulate (Penn, 2004).
