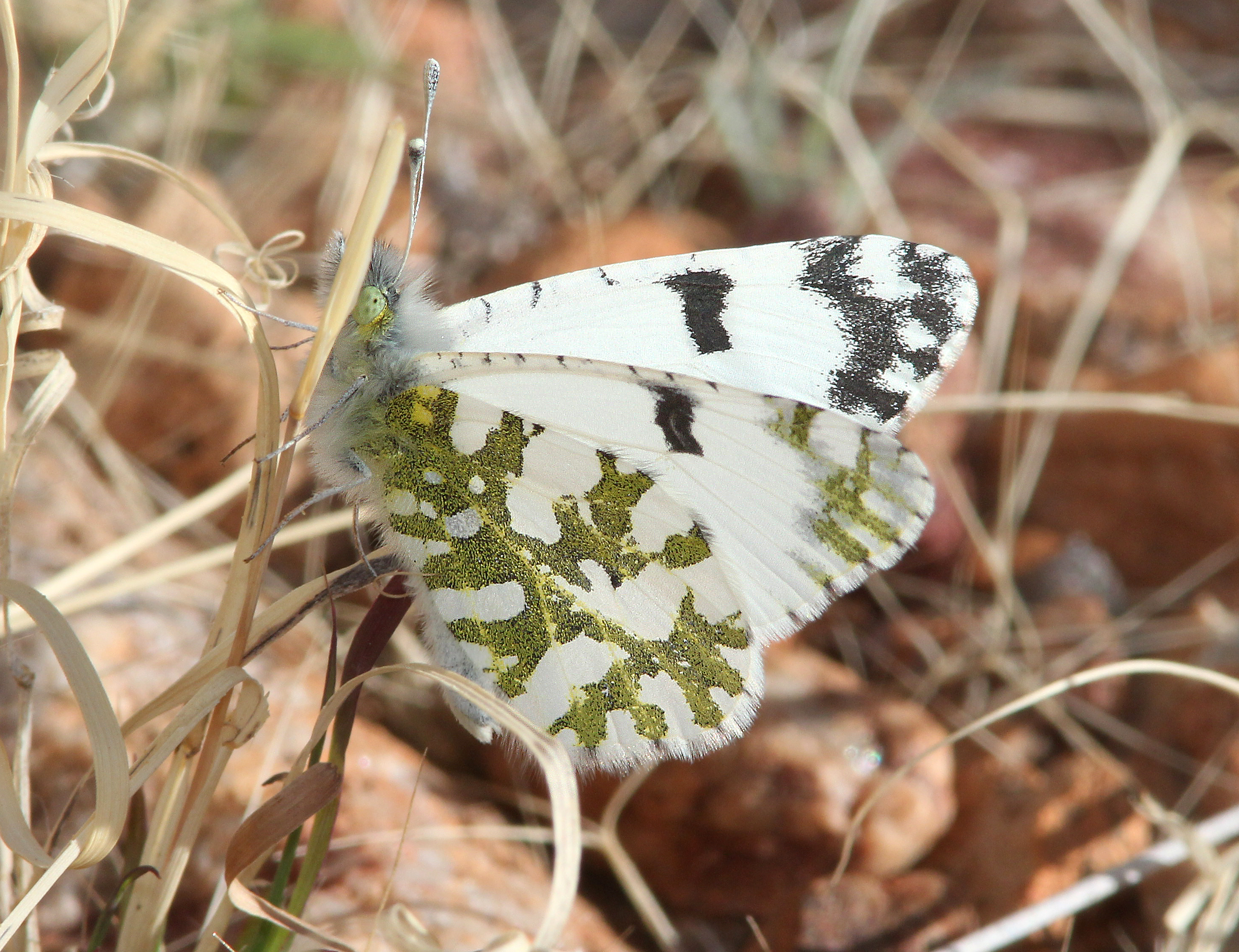

Scientific classification
- Kingdom: Animalia
- Phylum: Arthropoda
- Class: Insecta
- Order: Lepidoptera
- Family: Pieridae
- Genus: Euchloe
- Species: E. lotta

Binomial name
- Euchloe lotta (Beutenmüller, 1898)

= Euchloe lotta =

Desert marble

Species of butterfly

Euchloe lotta, the desert marble, is a species of butterfly that occurs in the interior of British Columbia, Canada.

It is mostly white with black markings on the topside of the forewing tips and body. The underside has greenish-grey veins especially in the hindwing. The wingspan is from 38 to 40 mm.

The desert marble's flight season in North America is from April to May. It inhabits sagelands, deserts, juniper woodland, dry, rocky areas, dry ravines, and canyon walls.

Larvae feed on Arabis furcata, Arabis sparsiflora, Arabis bolboellii, and Halimolobos whitedi.
