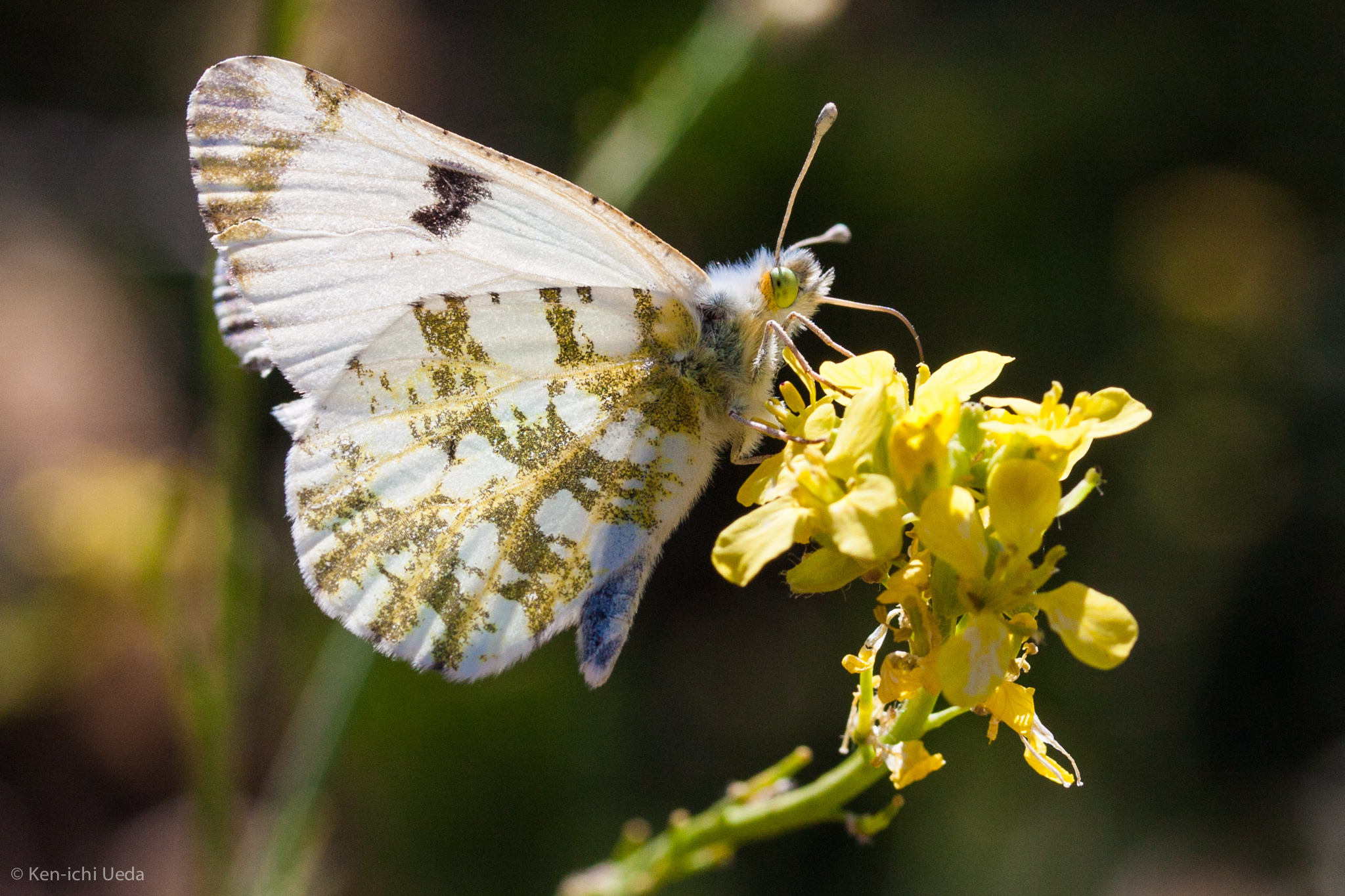

Conservation status
- Apparently Secure (NatureServe)

Scientific classification
- Kingdom: Animalia
- Phylum: Arthropoda
- Clade: Pancrustacea
- Class: Insecta
- Order: Lepidoptera
- Family: Pieridae
- Genus: Euchloe
- Species: E. ausonides

Binomial name
- Euchloe ausonides (Lucas, 1852)

Subspecies
- Five, see text

= Euchloe ausonides =

Species of butterfly

Euchloe ausonides, the large marble or creamy marblewing, is a species of butterfly that occurs in western North America. It lays eggs on the terminal flower buds of a variety of plants in the mustard family, including introduced Eurasian species, and the larvae feed on the buds, flowers and fruit of these plants. In California, it has witnessed population declines since the 1980s, especially in the Central Valley and the Bay Area. In Washington, subspecies the island marble butterfly (Euchloe ausonides ssp. insulanus) was listed as an endangered species under the Endangered Species Act in 2020.

== Description ==
The caterpillar is a dark green to a bluish gray color that is covered in black dots. It is marked with yellow and white stripes lengthwise along its back and sides. The size of the caterpillar reaches a length of 3/4 in.

The large marble is a medium-sized butterfly. It has white scales that are scattered in the forewing and a black pattern on the tip of the forewing. There is compact green marbling on the underside of the hindwing. The wingspan of this butterfly can go from 3.8 - 5.1 cm.

Females of E. ausonides are able to move at greater distances and speeds than males.

== Distribution ==
Euchloe ausonides can be found in the west of North America. They can range from the south of Alaska to central California and northern New Mexico. The island marble subspecies is nonmigratory.

== Habitat ==
Euchloe ausonides tend to live in open, sunny areas such as valleys, hillsides, fields and meadows. They often fly low next to streams and trails. A requirement of the marble butterfly's habitat is a “host” plant. This provides a place for the butterfly to lay its eggs, and provides food for the growing caterpillars. The subspecies, the island marble, is home to the San Juan Islands. Host plants, including the field mustard (Brassica rapa), are quite common in the San Juan Islands. Additional host plants that are important to the marble butterflies are tall tumble mustard (Sisymbrium altissimum) and tall peppergrass (Lepidium virginicum).

== Diet ==
The larva eats only on buds, flowers, and fruits. Adult large marbles like to drink nectar from the flowers of the mustard family and other plants.

== Reproduction ==
=== Mating behaviors ===
Males will fly, or patrol, about 1 meter above the ground looking for females. The males will draw near white paper models, other light butterflies and other Euchloe individuals within about 20 cm. They will either turn away and continue flight, or hover in courtship. Both the males and females fly at a rapid rate of about 5 meters per second and will often travel 100 meters or more without resting. If a flying male encounters a flying female, they will first hover near each other with the male behind. The female will then land, and the male lands behind her and bends his abdomen to clasp hers. If the weather permits, mating can occur all throughout the day.

=== Reproduction ===
In the late spring, adult butterflies will appear from their chrysalis and will fly free for about 7–9 days. Within this time, they will feed on nectar plants, find a mate, fertilize their eggs, and finally lay their eggs on host plants. Euchloe ausonides' eggs are laid on terminal flower buds. After about 10–12 days, their eggs will hatch and a caterpillar is born. The caterpillars will eat the host plants.

== Conservation status ==
Its subspecies, Euchloe ausonides insulanus, or the island marble, is an endangered species. Because of its rarity and fragility, this butterfly officially listed under the Endangered Species Act (ESA) as of May 4, 2020. It was once thought to be extinct, but it has been rediscovered on San Juan Island in Washington.

=== Conservation efforts ===
There have been multiple organizations putting in efforts to try and conserve the island marble for many years. Organizations such as US Fish and Wildlife Service (USFWS), Washington Department of Fish and Wildlife, the San Juan Preservation Trust, The National Park Service, and even a host of private landowners, schools, and concerned citizens have taken a stand to help conserve these endangered butterflies.

To help local landowners understand and distinguish island marble butterflies, USFWS and Washington Department of Fish and Wildlife worked together to develop information in order to provide voluntary guidelines for producing and managing island marble habitat.

=== Threats ===
Although the island marble has been listed and is now protected under the Endangered Species Act, the rare butterfly still faces many threats. Currently, grazing by deer is a big problem for the endangered species. The mustard plants that the island marble use for larval food and nectar are being eaten by the deer. This may reduce the number of host plants that are suitable for the butterflies to lay their eggs on. Along with this, the deer inadvertently eat the caterpillars, eggs, and pupae. In addition to the deer, there are also threats from non-native grazers introduced by people, including invasive European rabbits and snails, which also eat much of the native vegetation. There have been a few actions that have taken place to deal with this problem.

== Subspecies ==
- Euchloe ausonides coloradensis (H. Edwards, 1881)
- Euchloe ausonides palaeoreios Johnson, 1977
- Euchloe ausonides mayi F. & R. Chermock, 1940
- Euchloe ausonides transmontana Austin & Emmel, 1998
- Euchloe ausonides insulana Guppy & Shepard, 2001 – Island marble
