= Euchloe guaymasensis =

Scientific classification
- Kingdom: Animalia
- Phylum: Arthropoda
- Class: Insecta
- Order: Lepidoptera
- Family: Pieridae
- Genus: Euchloe
- Species: E. guaymasensis

Binomial name
- Euchloe guaymasensis Opler, 1986

Species of butterfly

Euchloe guaymasensis, the Sonoran marble or Sonoran white, is a species of butterfly in the family Pieridae. It is native to Sonora in Mexico and has been seen once in Arizona in the United States.

The butterfly has a wingspan of 31–37 millimetres (1.2–1.5 in). The upperside is pale yellow. The forewing has a black tip and a black bar toward the front edge. The underside is marbled with green.

This species occurs in rocky desert habitat. Its host plant is western tansymustard (Descurainia pinnata). Adults fly in February and March.

This species was first collected in 1983 from a microwave relay 40 miles (64 km) north of Guaymas in Sonora.
