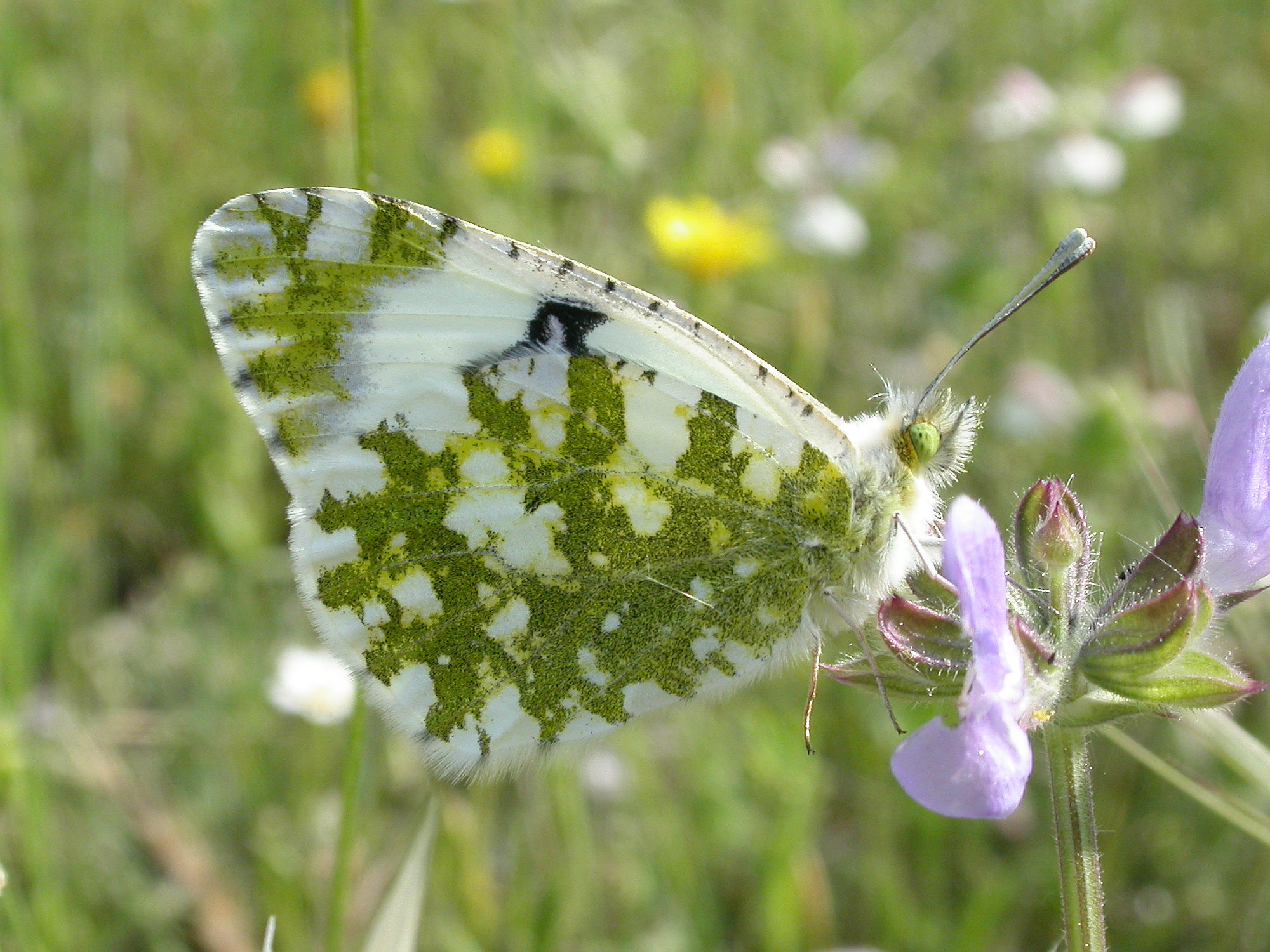

Scientific classification
- Kingdom: Animalia
- Phylum: Arthropoda
- Clade: Pancrustacea
- Class: Insecta
- Order: Lepidoptera
- Family: Pieridae
- Genus: Euchloe
- Species: E. crameri

Binomial name
- Euchloe crameri (Butler, 1869)

= Euchloe crameri =

Western dappled white

Species of butterfly

Euchloe crameri, the western dappled white, is a butterfly in the family Pieridae.

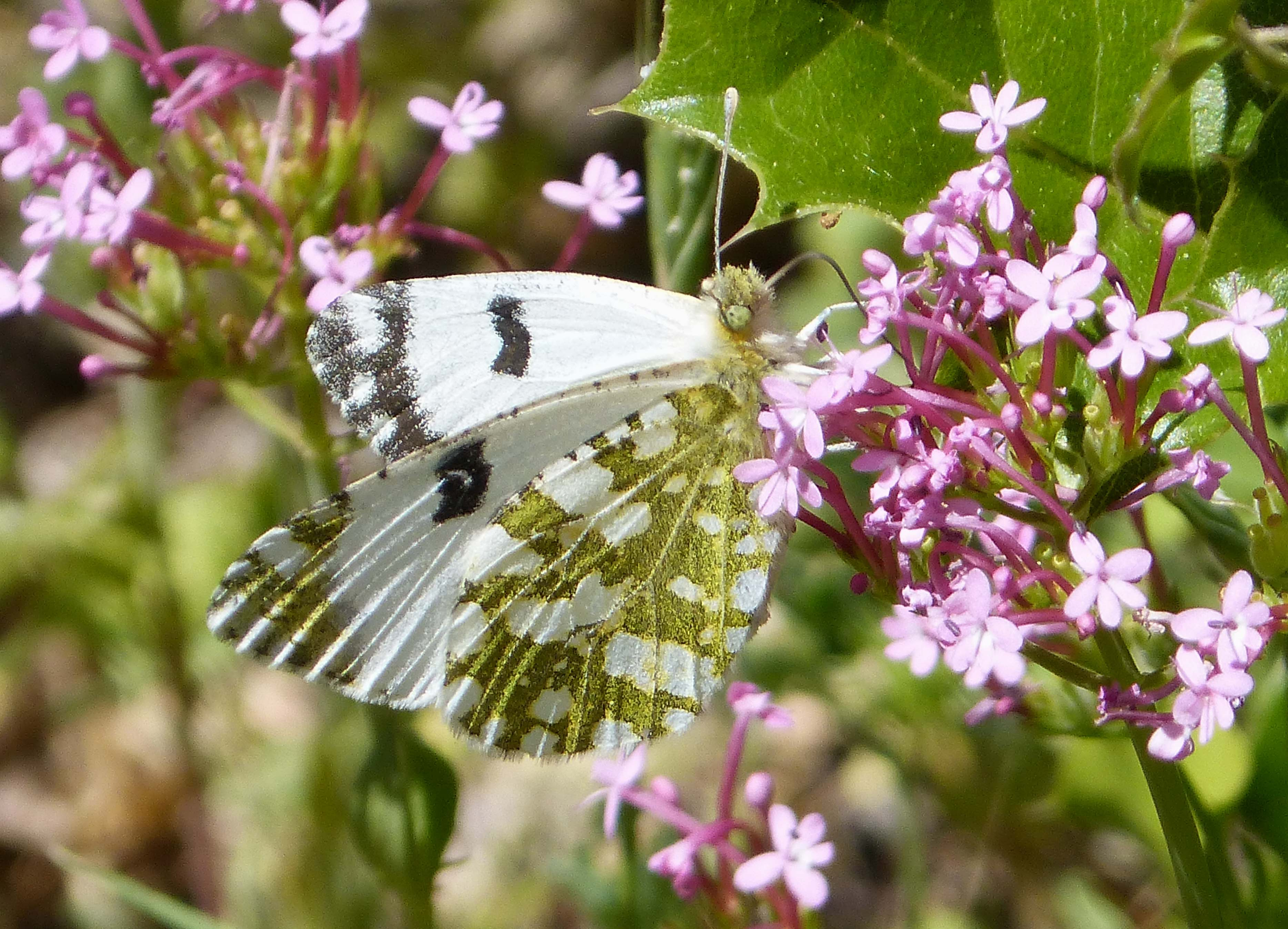

== Description ==
Fore and hind wings pearly white on the upperside, with a black apex, mottled white. Underside of the forewings very similar, although the apex spot is greenish; in the hind wings, the greenish colour predominates, with white spots. The female is larger, with a more greenish colour, a consequence of the superposition of black and yellow scales. Very similar to Euchloe ausonia.

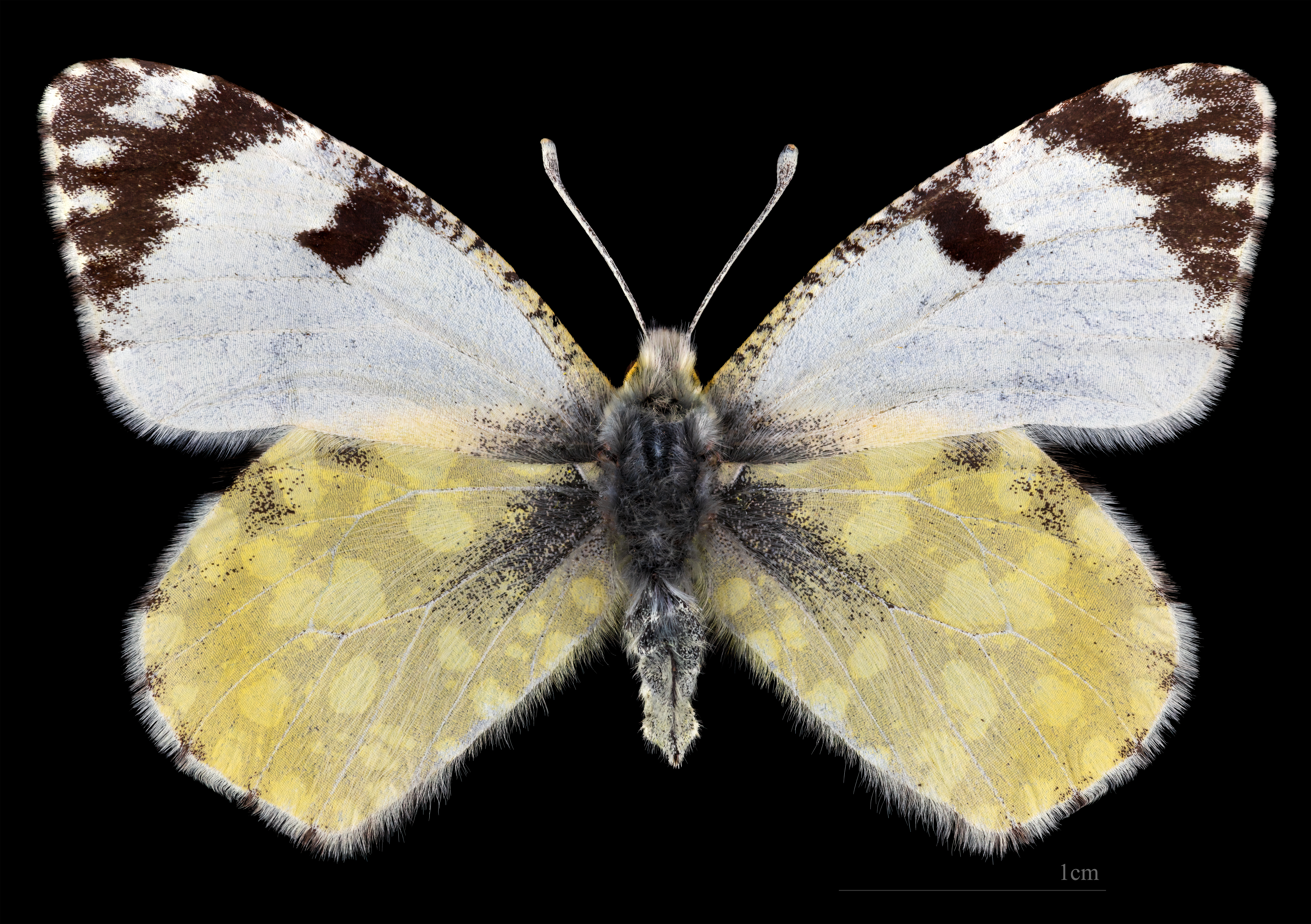
Euchloe crameri ♀

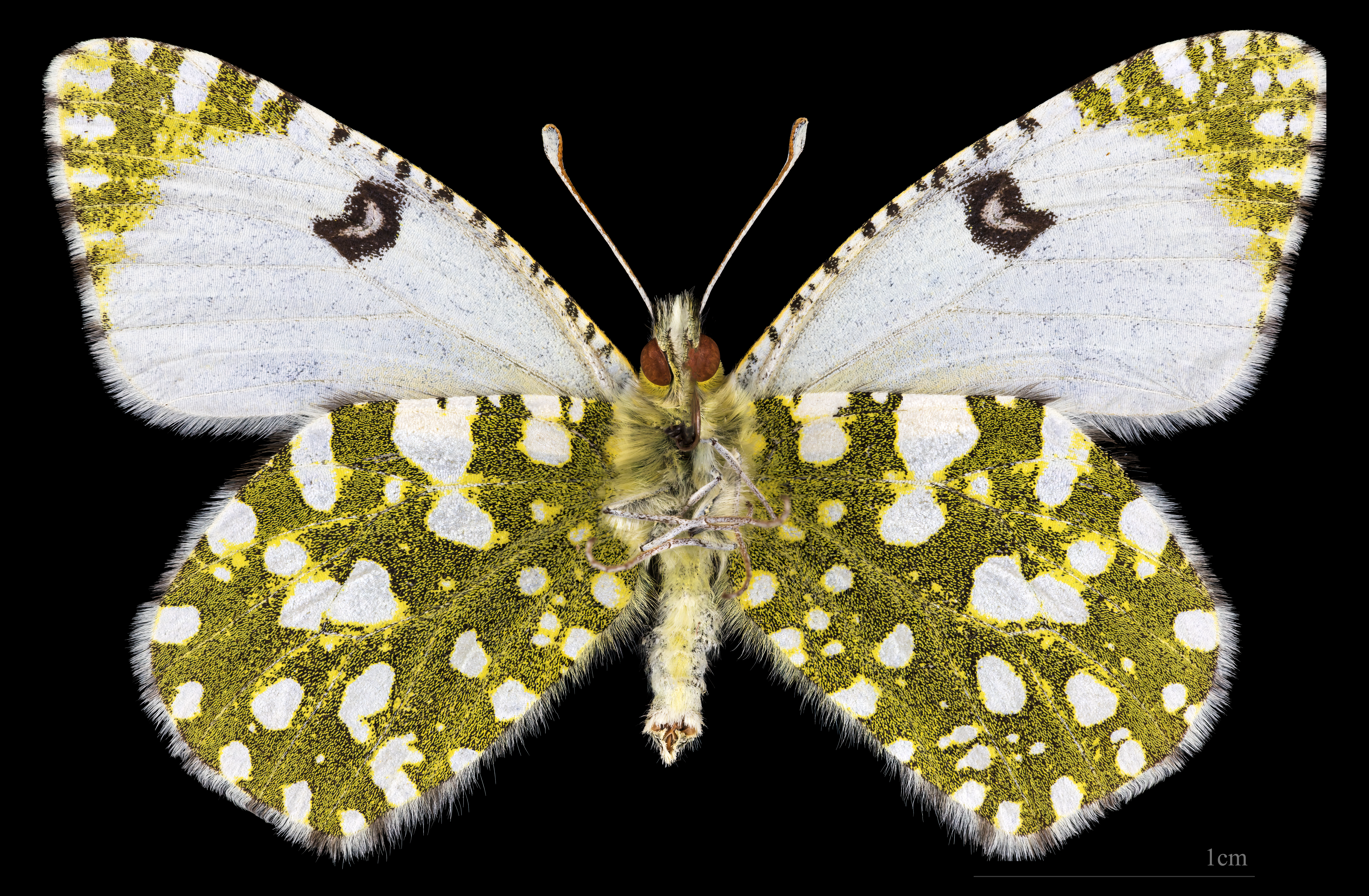
Euchloe crameri ♀ △

== Distribution and habitat ==
Widely distributed and mainly western, from Northwest Africa, Iberian Peninsula, S and SE of France, N of Italy, Ligurian Alps to Bologna. Its distribution overlaps with that of E. simplonia in E Pyrenees and SE of France . In Spain and Portugal it occurs abundantly in the Iberian Peninsula, especially in the Mediterranean area. It is a very adaptable and nomadic species, so it is found in all types of habitats from 0 -2400m. In Sierra Nevada (Spain) they have been observed even above 2500 m altitude, although in these populations there is only one annual reproduction, and their density is low. The specimens of this mountainous area were described by Heinrich Ribbe, in 1905, as a differentiated subspecies, under the name of Euchloe alhambra, although it has been rejected that there are differences that justify such a presumption. Likes open, warm and dry areas, and in rural lands, preferably cultivated.

== Flight period ==
Bivoltine, reproduces twice a year, with the first brood in February, and the second between April and May. Flies until August.

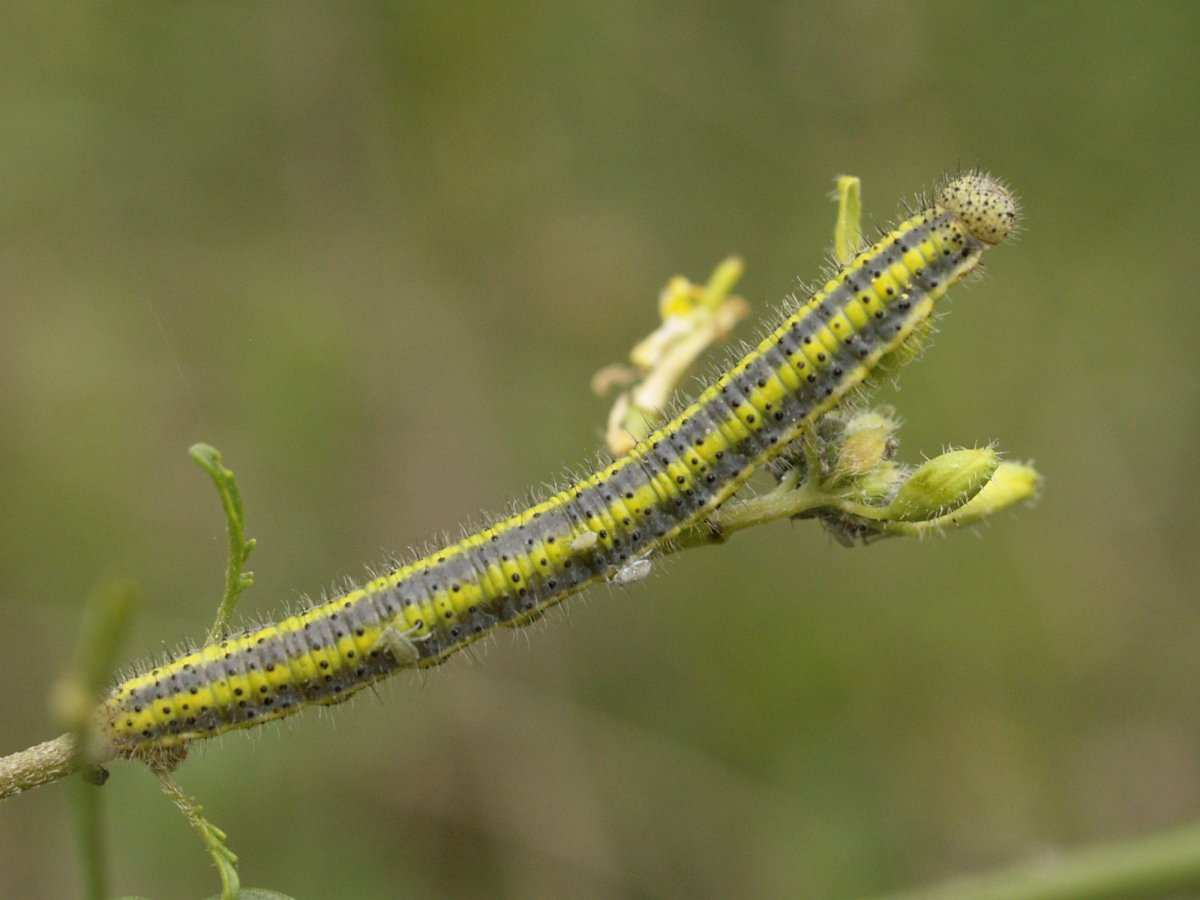
larva

== Biology ==
Oviposition is on the floral buds of various plants (Sinapis arvensis, Moricandia foleyi , Sinapis alba, Biscutella spathulata, Erucastrum naturiifolium), individually, and the caterpillar develops quickly on the leaves, soon attaining the chrysalis phase. Not all chrysalis develop into adult individuals in the first year, as some of them hibernate, remaining in that state, sometimes, up to several years; Therefore, the second generation is always partial.

== Subspecies ==
Euchloe crameri mauretanica (Röber 1907)
