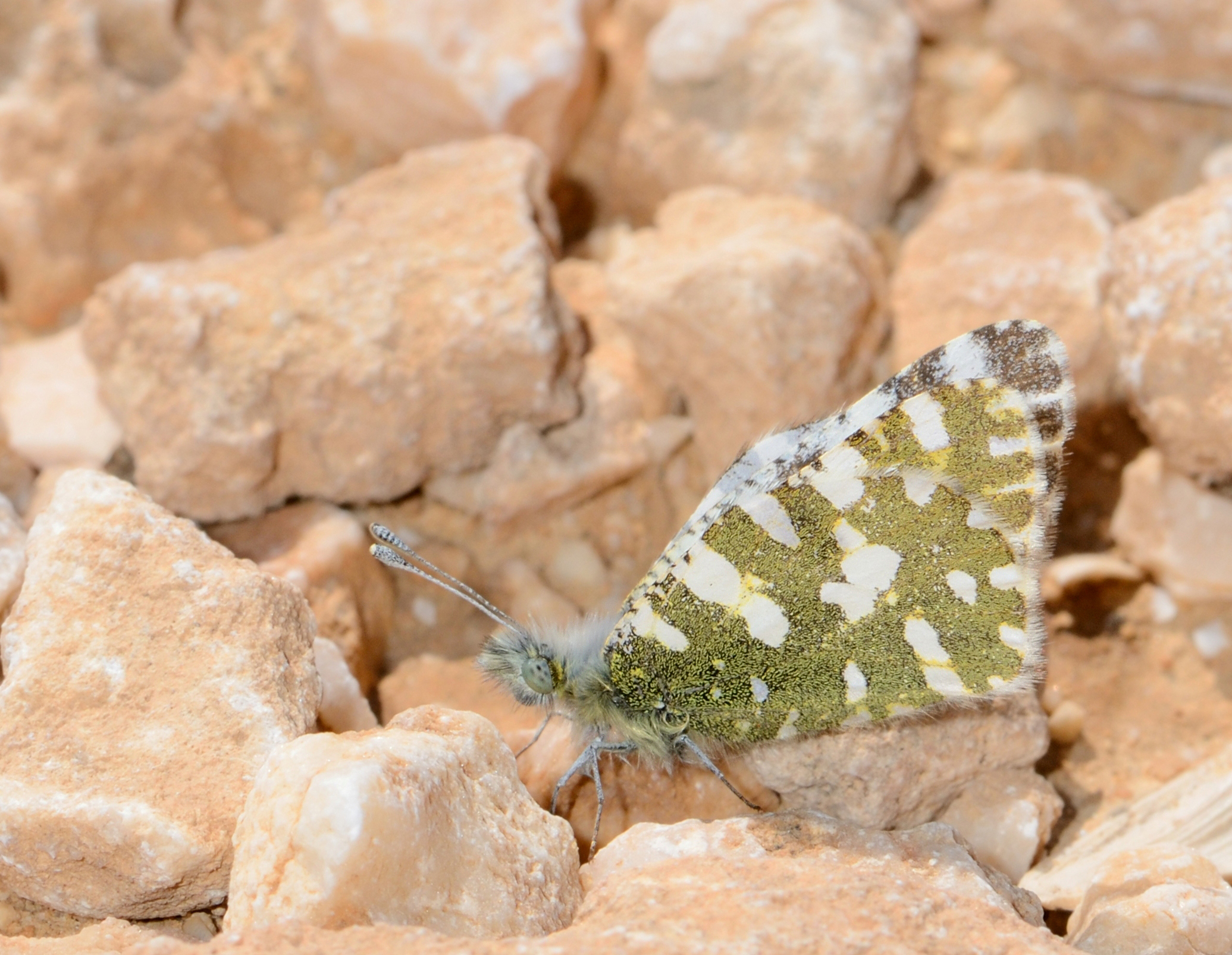

Scientific classification
- Kingdom: Animalia
- Phylum: Arthropoda
- Class: Insecta
- Order: Lepidoptera
- Family: Pieridae
- Genus: Euchloe
- Species: E. aegyptiaca

Binomial name
- Euchloe aegyptiaca Verity, 1911

Synonyms
- Euchloe belia r. aegyptiaca Verity, 1911

= Euchloe aegyptiaca =

Species of butterfly

Euchloe aegyptiaca is a butterfly in the family Pieridae. It is found from Libya to Egypt and Jordan, extending into Saudi Arabia.

The larvae feed on Brassicaceae species, including Diplotaxis harra.
