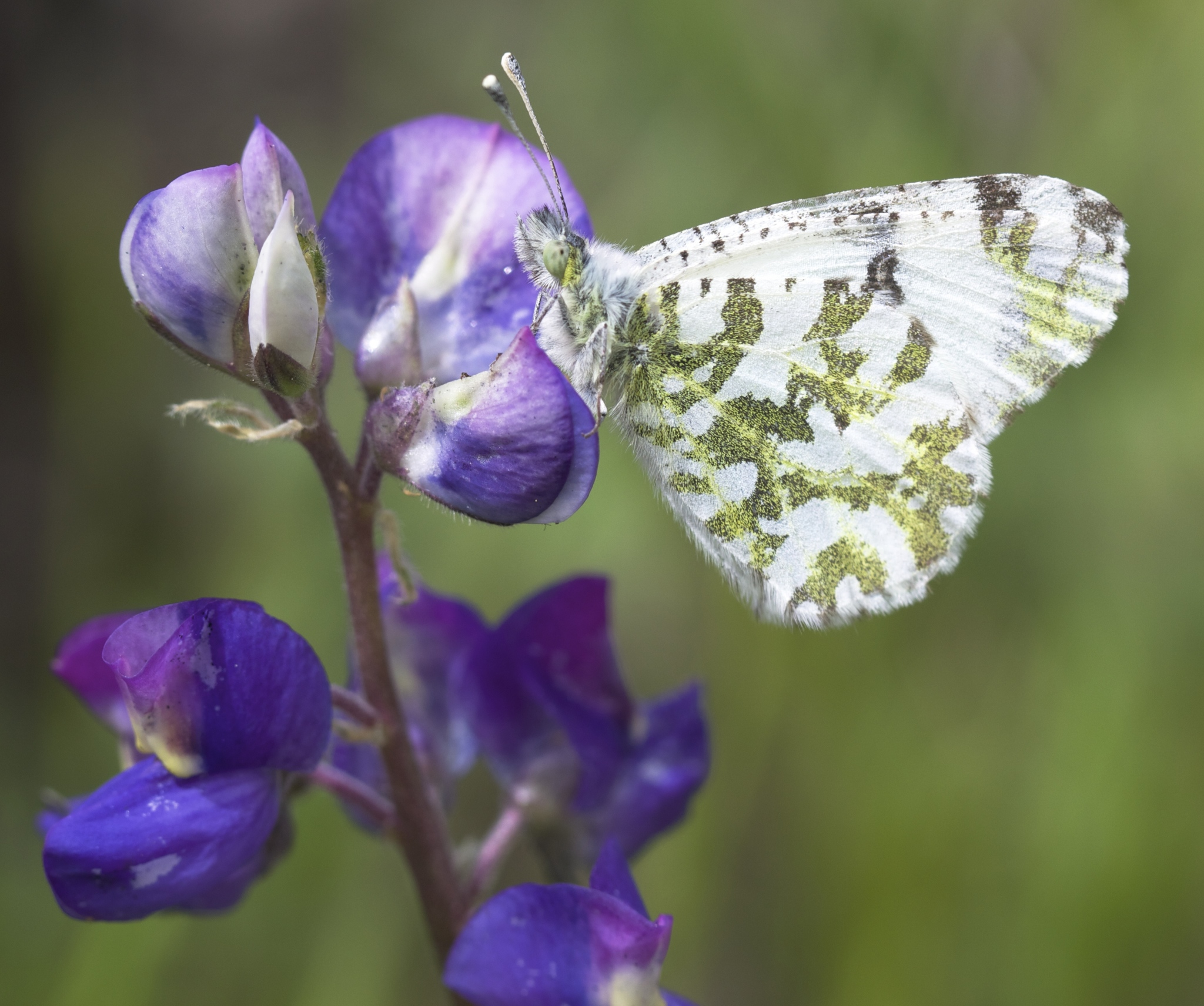

Conservation status
- Vulnerable (NatureServe)

Scientific classification
- Kingdom: Animalia
- Phylum: Arthropoda
- Clade: Pancrustacea
- Class: Insecta
- Order: Lepidoptera
- Family: Pieridae
- Genus: Euchloe
- Species: E. hyantis

Binomial name
- Euchloe hyantis (W.H. Edwards, 1871)

Synonyms
- Euchloe pseudoausonides Verity, 1908; Euchloe orientalides Verity, 1908; Euchloe pumilio Strand, 1914

= Euchloe hyantis =

Species of butterfly

Euchloe hyantis, the pearly marble, pearly marblewing or California marble, is a butterfly in the family Pieridae. It is found on the West Coast of North America from southern Oregon south through California west of the Sierra Nevada crest to northern Baja California, Mexico. The habitat consists of rocky canyons, cliffs, moraines and gravelly flats.

The wingspan is 28–37 mm (1.1–1.5 in). Adults are on wing from April to early July in one generation per year.

The larvae feed on the flowers and fruits of Brassicaceae species, especially Streptanthus species. Chrysalids hibernate.

== Subspecies ==
The following subspecies are recognized:

- Euchloe hyantis hyantis
- Euchloe hyantis andrewsi Martin, 1936
