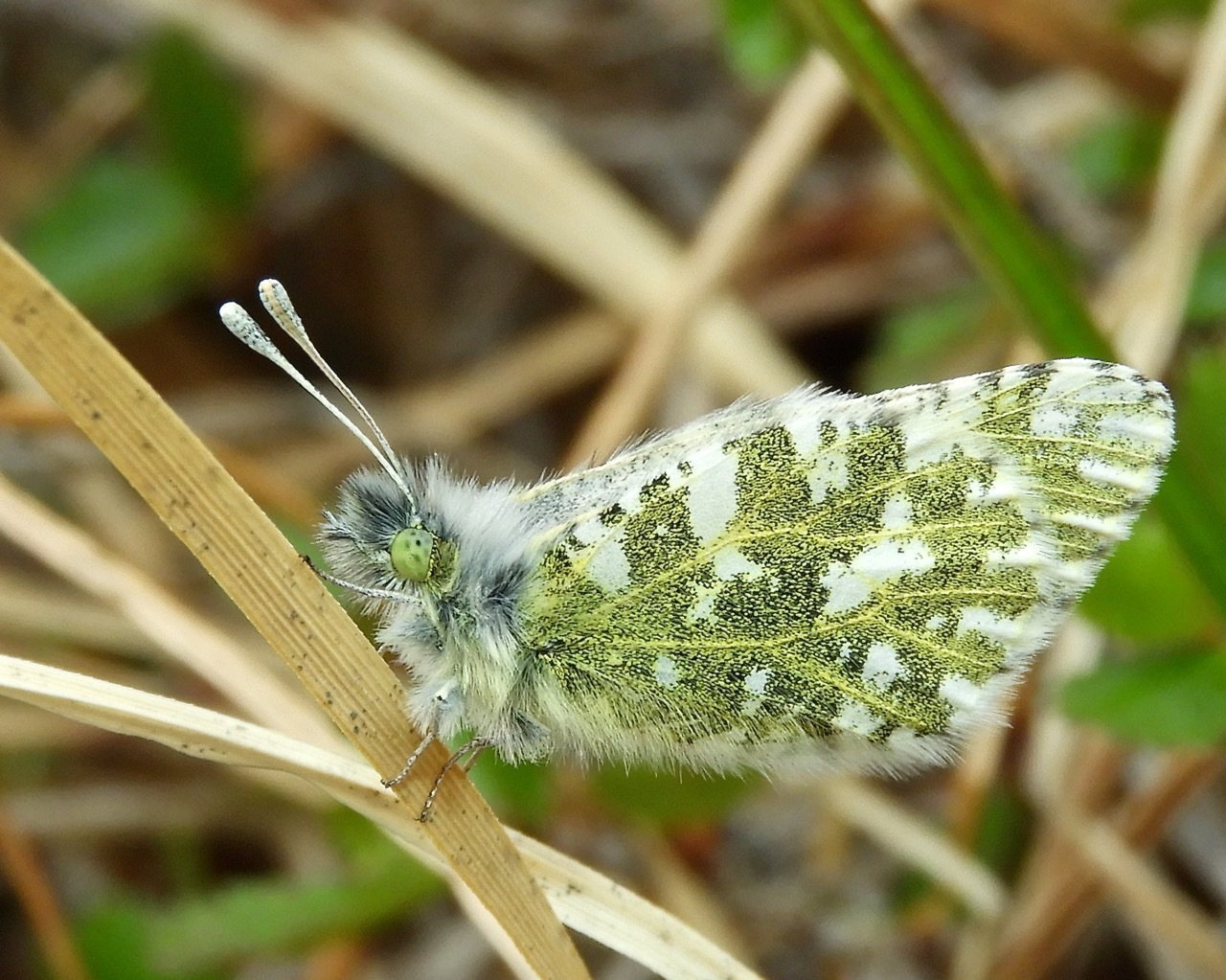

Conservation status
- Secure (NatureServe)

Scientific classification
- Kingdom: Animalia
- Phylum: Arthropoda
- Clade: Pancrustacea
- Class: Insecta
- Order: Lepidoptera
- Family: Pieridae
- Genus: Euchloe
- Species: E. creusa

Binomial name
- Euchloe creusa (Doubleday, [1847])

Synonyms
- Anthocharis creusa Doubleday, [1847]; Euchloe elsa Beutenmüller, 1898; Synchloe creusa

= Euchloe creusa =

Species of butterfly

Euchloe creusa, the northern marble, is a species of butterfly that occurs in northern North America.

It is mostly white with black markings on the topside of the forewing tips and body. The underside has greenish-grey veins especially in the hindwing. The wingspan is from 24 to 36 mm. Its habitats include subalpine moraines, forest clearings, glades, and dry tundra.

The northern marble's flight season is from late May to mid-July.

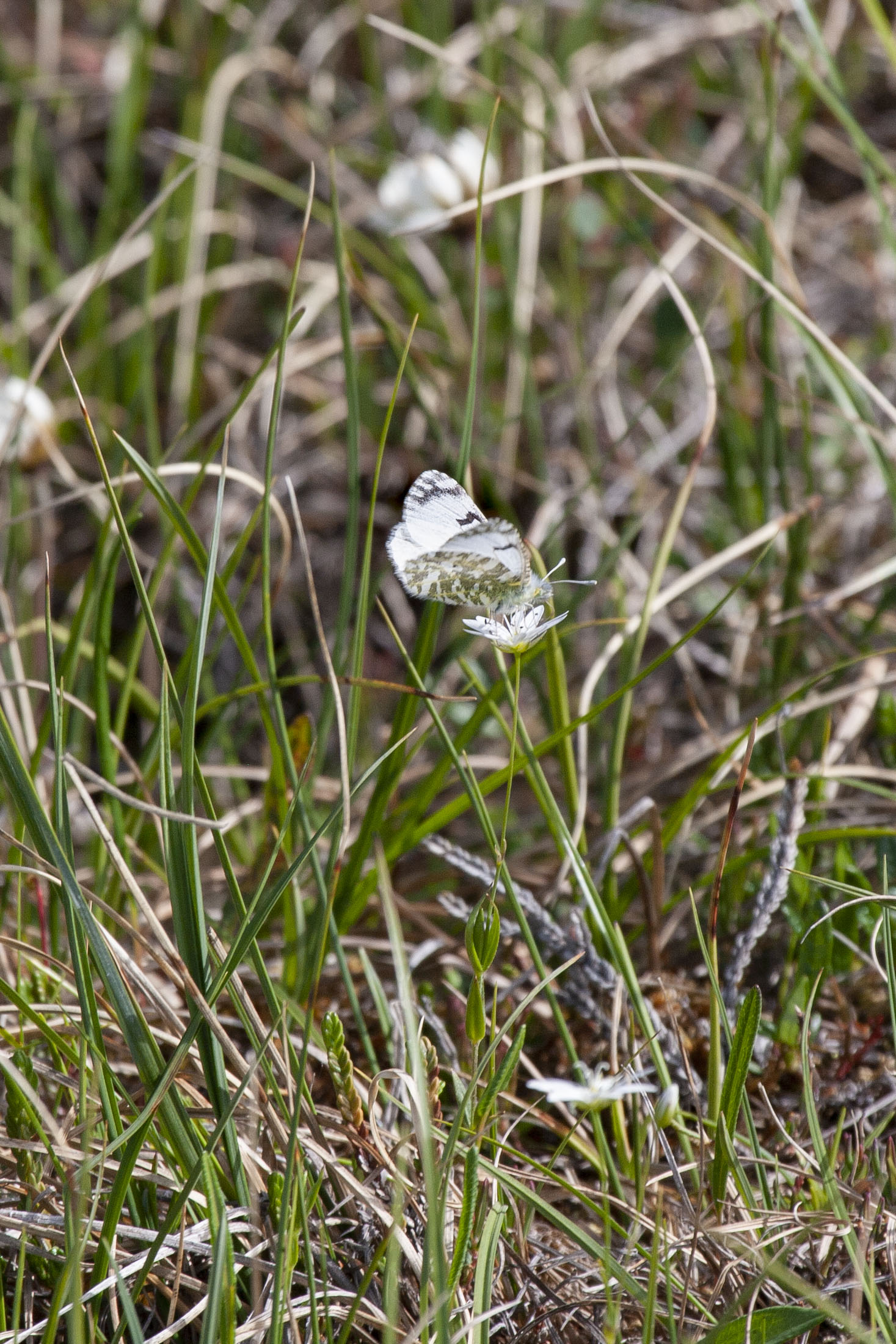
Northern marble

Larvae feed on Draba and Brassicaceae species.
