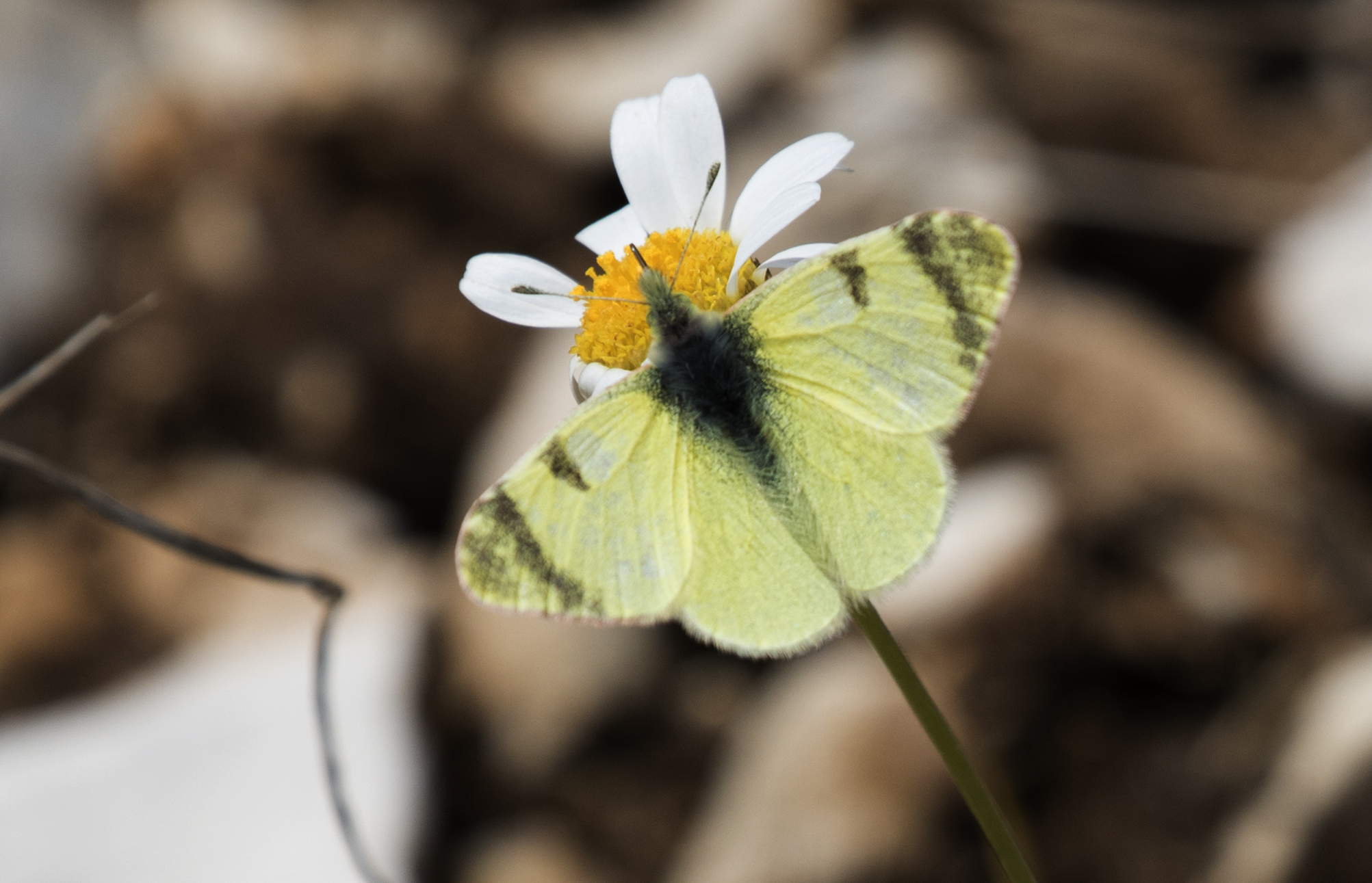

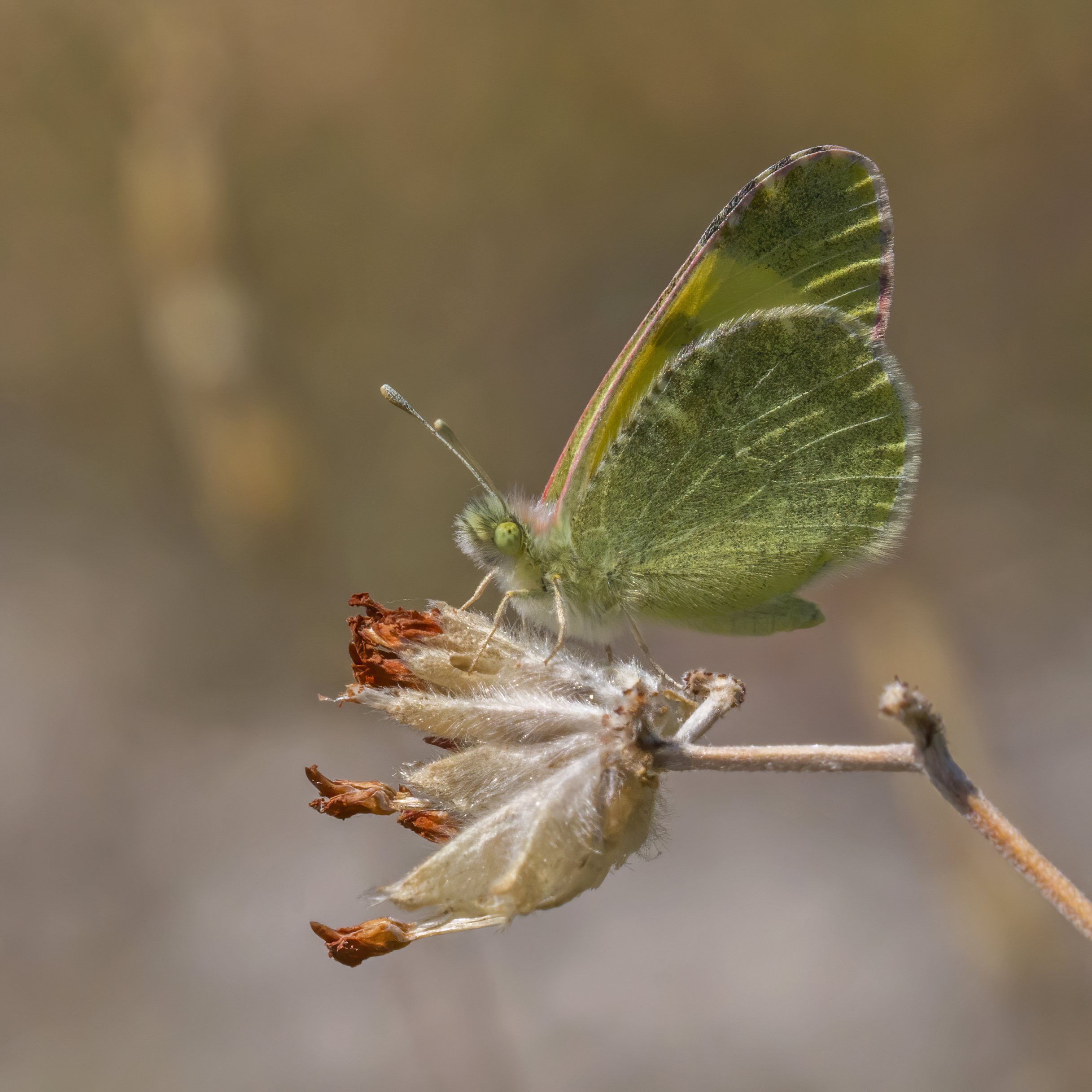

Scientific classification
- Kingdom: Animalia
- Phylum: Arthropoda
- Class: Insecta
- Order: Lepidoptera
- Family: Pieridae
- Genus: Euchloe
- Species: E. penia

Binomial name
- Euchloe penia (Freyer, 1805)

Synonyms
- Anthocharis thessalica Mezger, 1936; Elphinstonia penia; Pontia penia Freyer, 1805

= Euchloe penia =

Eastern greenish black-tip

Species of butterfly

Euchloe penia, the eastern greenish black-tip, is a butterfly in the family Pieridae. It is found in North Macedonia, Bulgaria, Greece, Turkey, Lebanon, Syria and northern Iraq. The habitat consists of dry and warm rocky areas.

The wingspan is 32–36 mm. Adults are bright greenish off yellow. There are two generations per year, with adults on wing in April and from June to July.

The larvae feed on Matthiola species including M. tessela and M. fruticulosa.

== Subspecies ==
- Euchloe penia penia
- Euchloe penia taleschicus Back & Leestmans, 2001
- Euchloe penia thessalica (Mezger, 1936)
