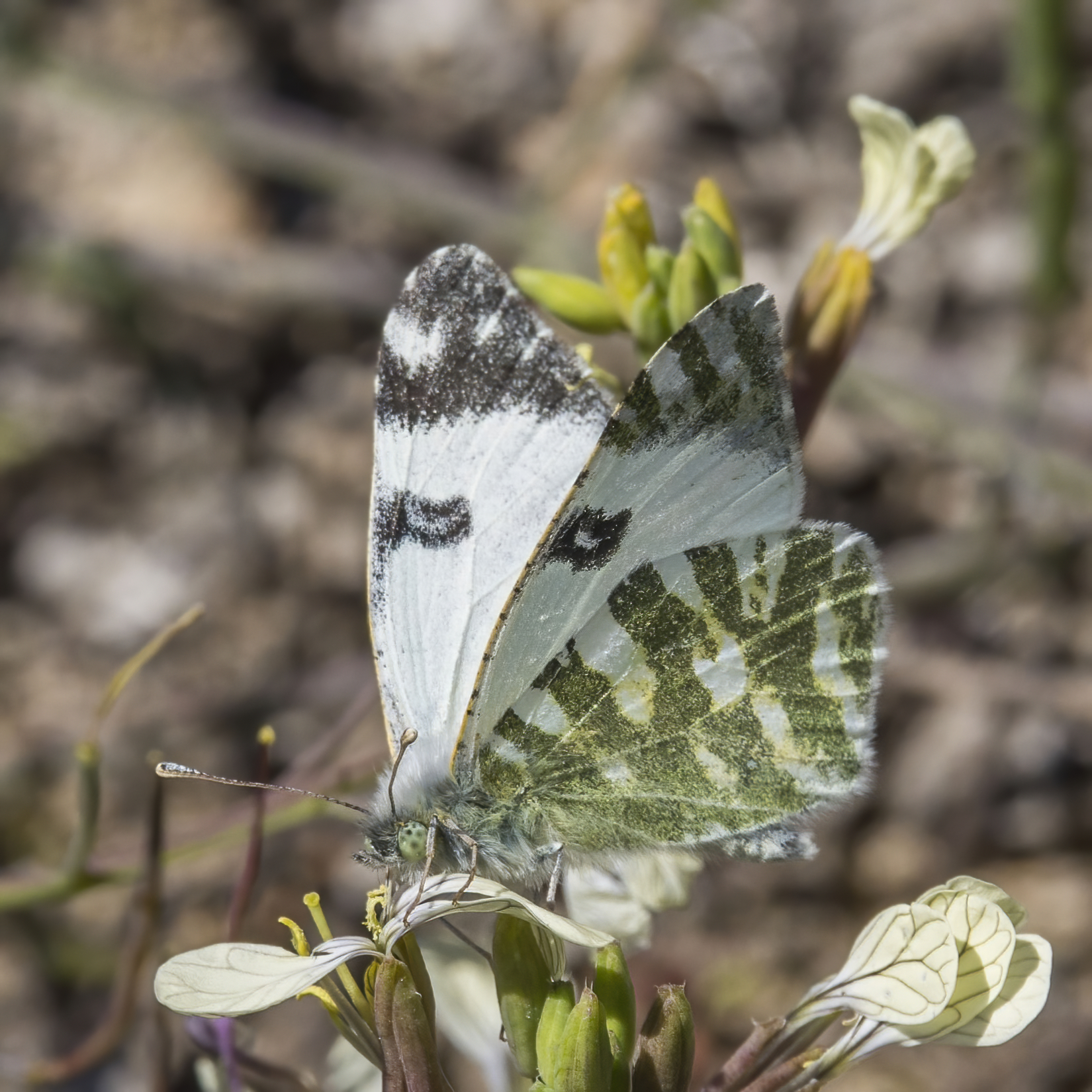
- Euchloe belemia belemia, Spain

Scientific classification
- Kingdom: Animalia
- Phylum: Arthropoda
- Clade: Pancrustacea
- Class: Insecta
- Order: Lepidoptera
- Family: Pieridae
- Genus: Euchloe
- Species: E. belemia

Binomial name
- Euchloe belemia (Esper, 1800)

Synonyms
- Papilio belemia Esper, 1800; Papilio glauce Hübner, [1803-1804]; Euchloe belemia ab. desertorum Turati, 1905; Euchloe belemia f. distincta Röber, 1907; Euchloe belemia ab. evanescens Röber, 1907; Euchloe belemia form. vern. röberi Rothschild, 1914; Anthocharis belemia var. glauce ab. conjuncta Holl, 1917; Euchloe belemia f. marmorata Chnéour, 1934

= Euchloe belemia =

Green-striped white

Species of butterfly

Euchloe belemia, the green-striped white, is a butterfly in the family Pieridae. Its range is northern Africa, Arabia (Oman, United Arab Emirates) and the southern Iberian Peninsula, especially Spain and Portugal.

The wingspan is 36–44 mm (1.4–1.7 in). Adults are on wing from February to June.

The larvae feed on Sisymbrium species (including Sisymbrium bourgeanum), Diplotaxis tennuisiliqua and Biscutella didyma. Its preferred habitat is lowland scrubland and semi-arid, as well as terraces and cultivated land.

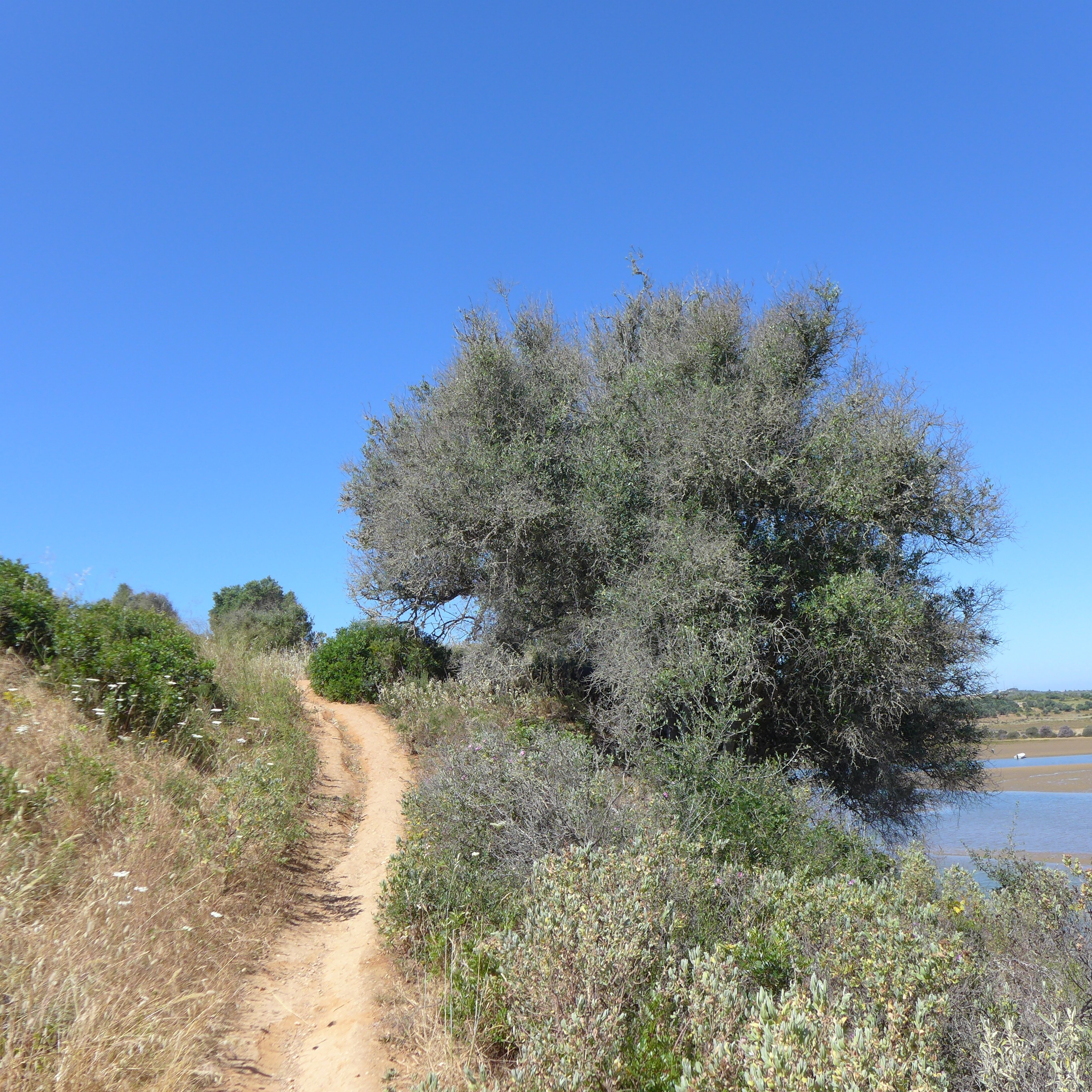
Habitat in Algarve, Portugal

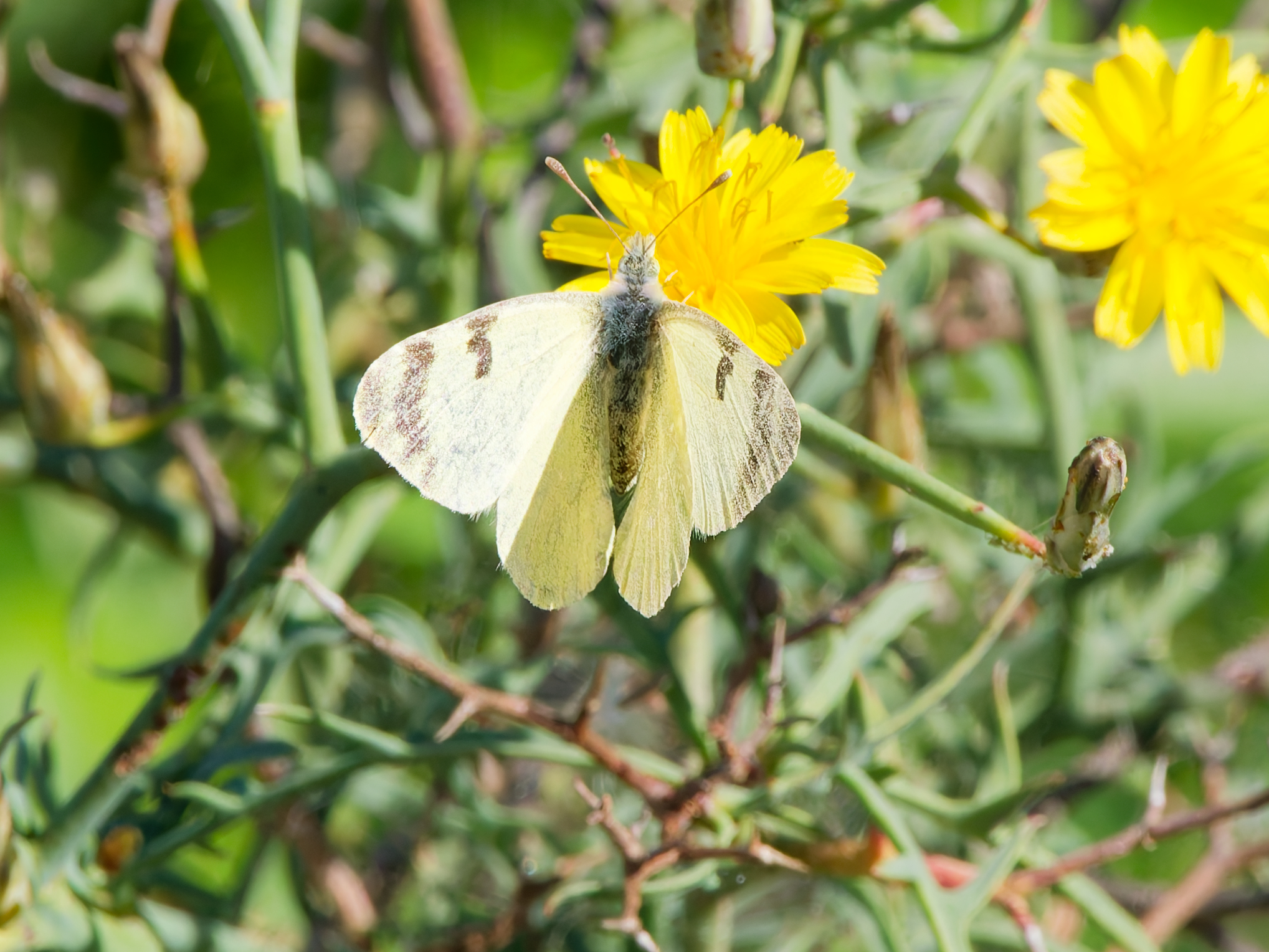
Euchloe hesperidum Fuerteventura Green-striped White in Fuerteventura

== Subspecies ==
- Euchloe belemia hesperidum Rothschild 1913
- Euchloe belemia eversi Eversi 1963
- Euchloe belemia abyssinica Stamm 1928 (Ethiopia, Somalia)
- Euchloe belemia belemia, Esper, 1800 (Oman, United Arab Emirates)
- Euchloe belemia palaestinensis Rüber 1907
- Euchloe belemia desertorum

== Repartition ==
The Euchloe subgenera groups are widely distributed in North Africa, the Iberian peninsula and the Canary Islands. The species Euchloe belemia in particular comprises at least six subspecies. The subspecies Euchloe belemia belemia and desertorum occur in the Iberian peninsula and North–West Africa, respectively. The subspecies Euchloe belemia palaestinensis and moslemi occur in Arabia.

The shortest genetic distance was found between Fuerteventura subspecies (E. b.hesperidum) and the Iberian-Moroccan subspecies (E.b. belemia and E. b. desertorum
