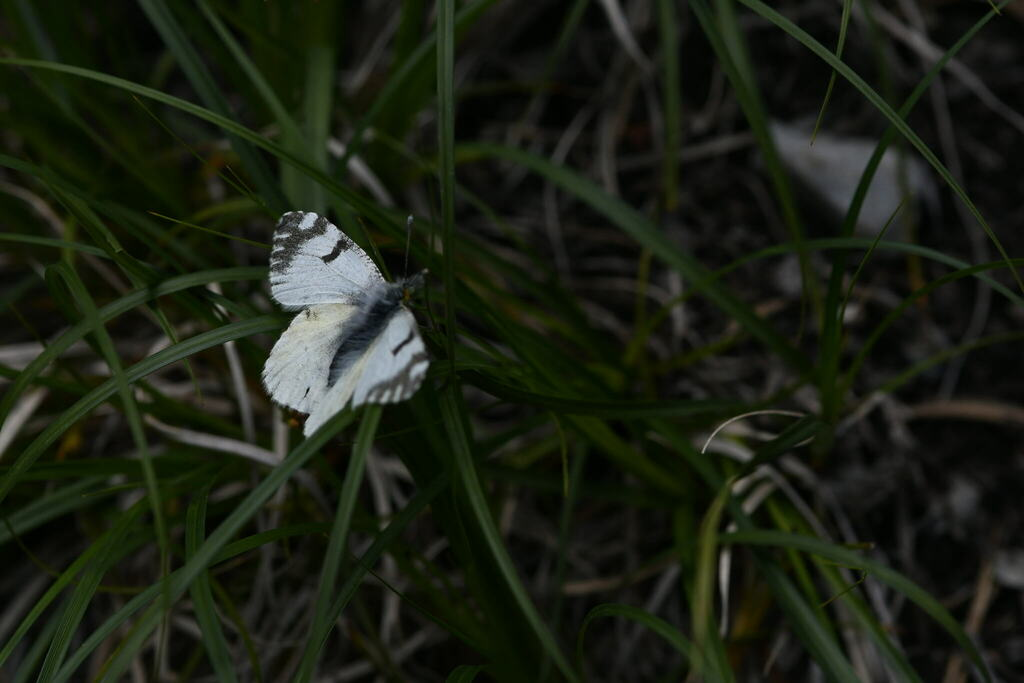

Conservation status
- Least Concern (IUCN 3.1)

Scientific classification
- Kingdom: Animalia
- Phylum: Arthropoda
- Class: Insecta
- Order: Lepidoptera
- Family: Pieridae
- Genus: Euchloe
- Species: E. simplonia

Binomial name
- Euchloe simplonia (Boisduval, 1878)

= Euchloe simplonia =

Mountain dappled white

Species of butterfly

Euchloe simplonia, the mountain dappled white, is a butterfly found in the mountainous regions of Western Europe. Its main foods are Sinapis, Isatis, Aethionema, Iberis and Biscutella species. Though data are lacking, it is believed that the species is restricted to a small area of the western Alps and is endangered in Europe. The species is closely related to Euchloe naina, and cross-breeding experiments suggest that E. nania may be a subspecies, though this is contested on morphological grounds.
