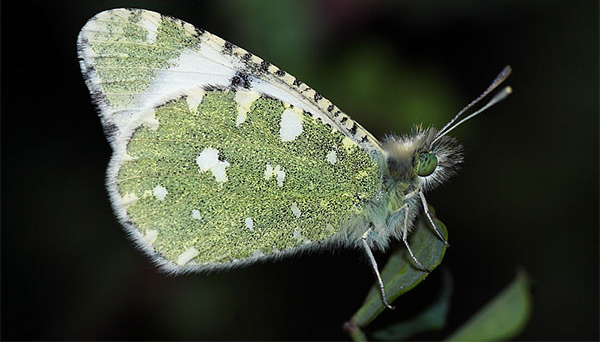

Scientific classification
- Kingdom: Animalia
- Phylum: Arthropoda
- Class: Insecta
- Order: Lepidoptera
- Family: Pieridae
- Genus: Euchloe
- Species: E. tagis

Binomial name
- Euchloe tagis (Hübner, 1804)

= Euchloe tagis =

Portuguese dappled white

Species of butterfly

Euchloe tagis, the Portuguese dappled white, is a butterfly in the family Pieridae.

It ranges through southern Europe where it is found from Portugal to northwestern Italy and northern Africa (there are local populations in Morocco and Algeria).

The imago has a black apical patch spotted with white on the forewing upperside, and a black discoid macula. The underside of the hind wings is gray-green, studded with white spots of variable extent.

This species is found in local, discrete populations limited to fairly small areas of suitable habitat which is invariably made of calcareous outcrops with Mediterranean scrubland where the food plants, crucifers of the genus Iberis are found.

The species flies from February to June, in a single generation. It winters at the chrysalis stage.

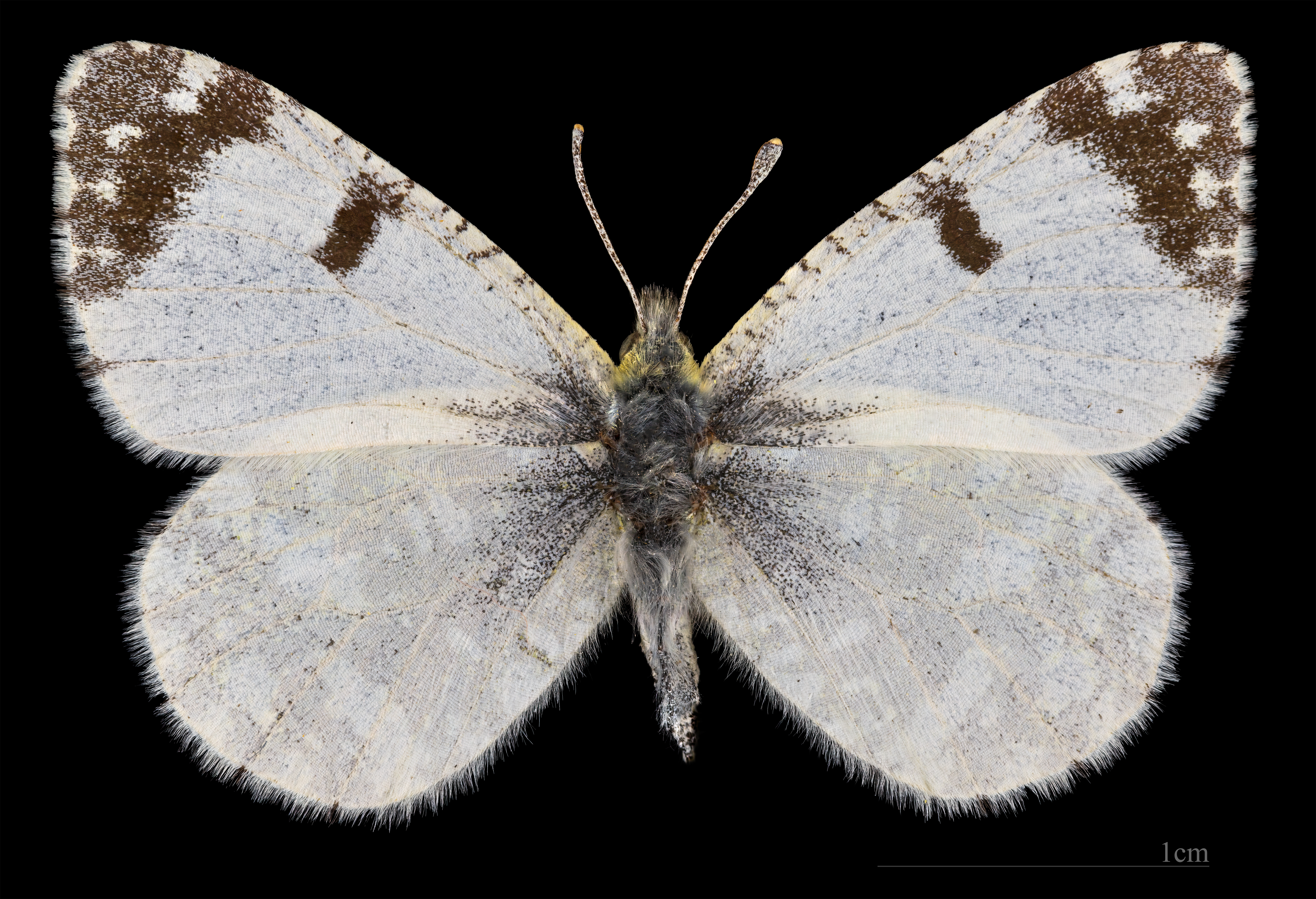
Euchloe tagis bellezina ♂

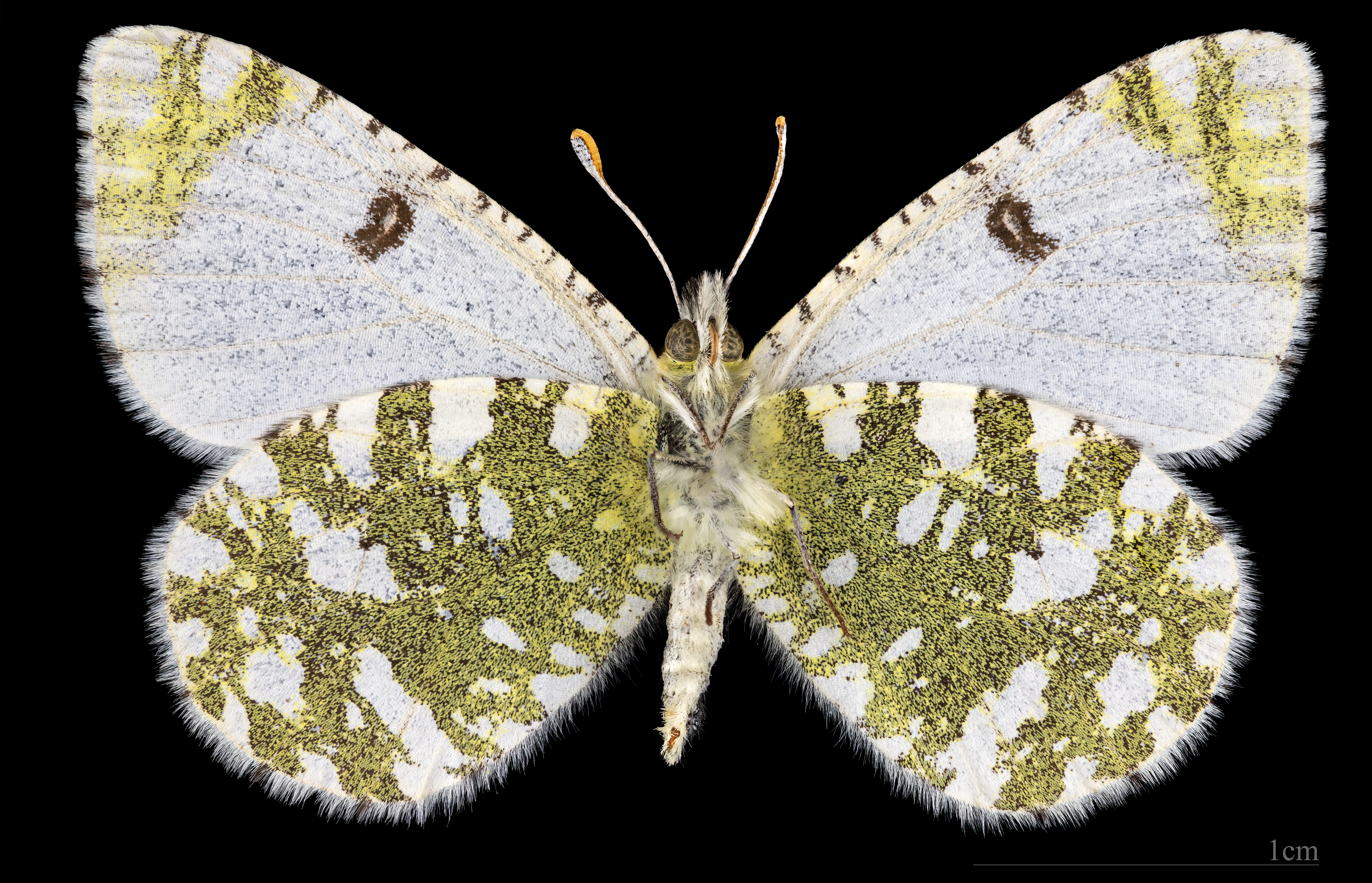
Euchloe tagis bellezina ♂ △

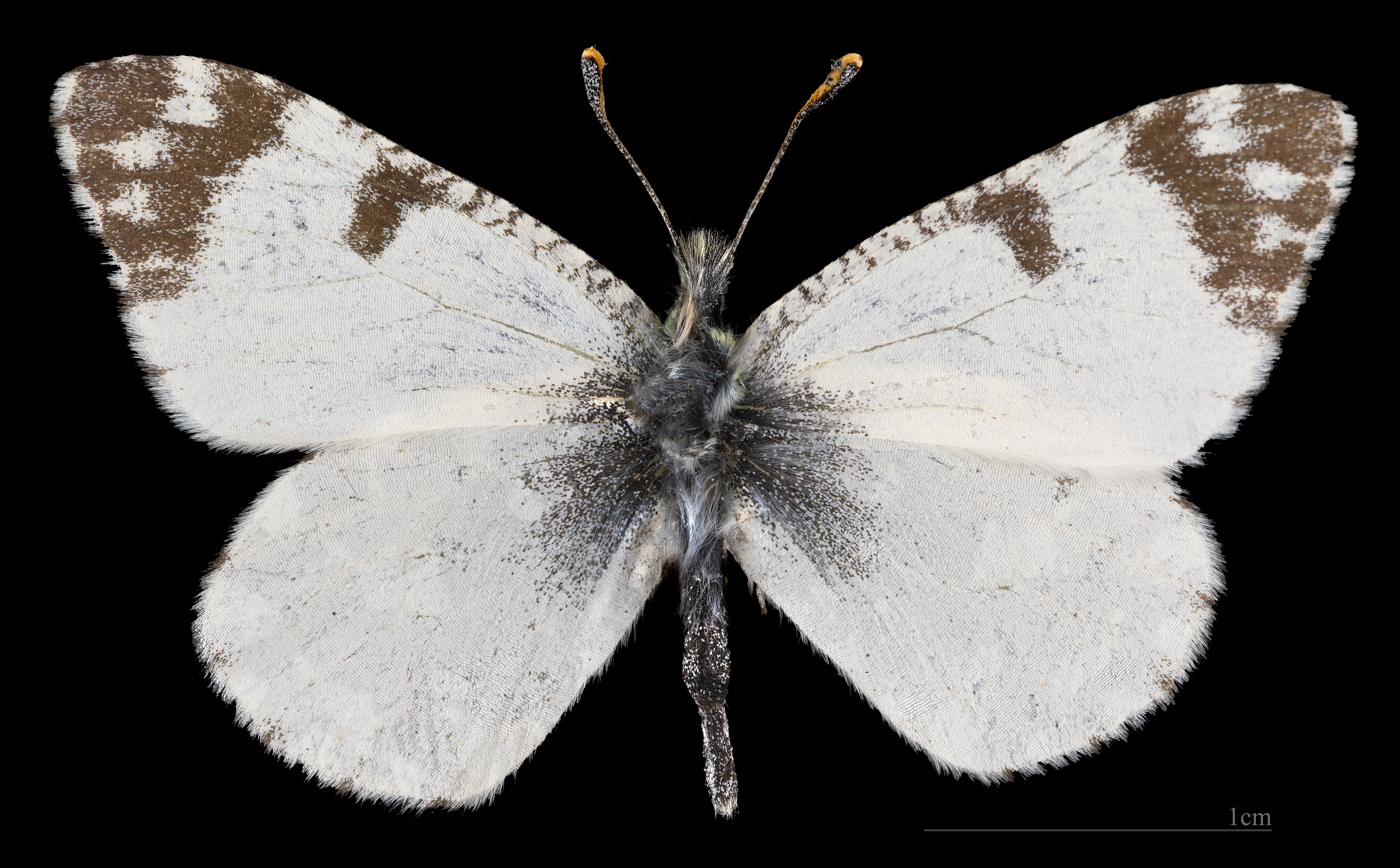
Euchloe tagis castillana ♂

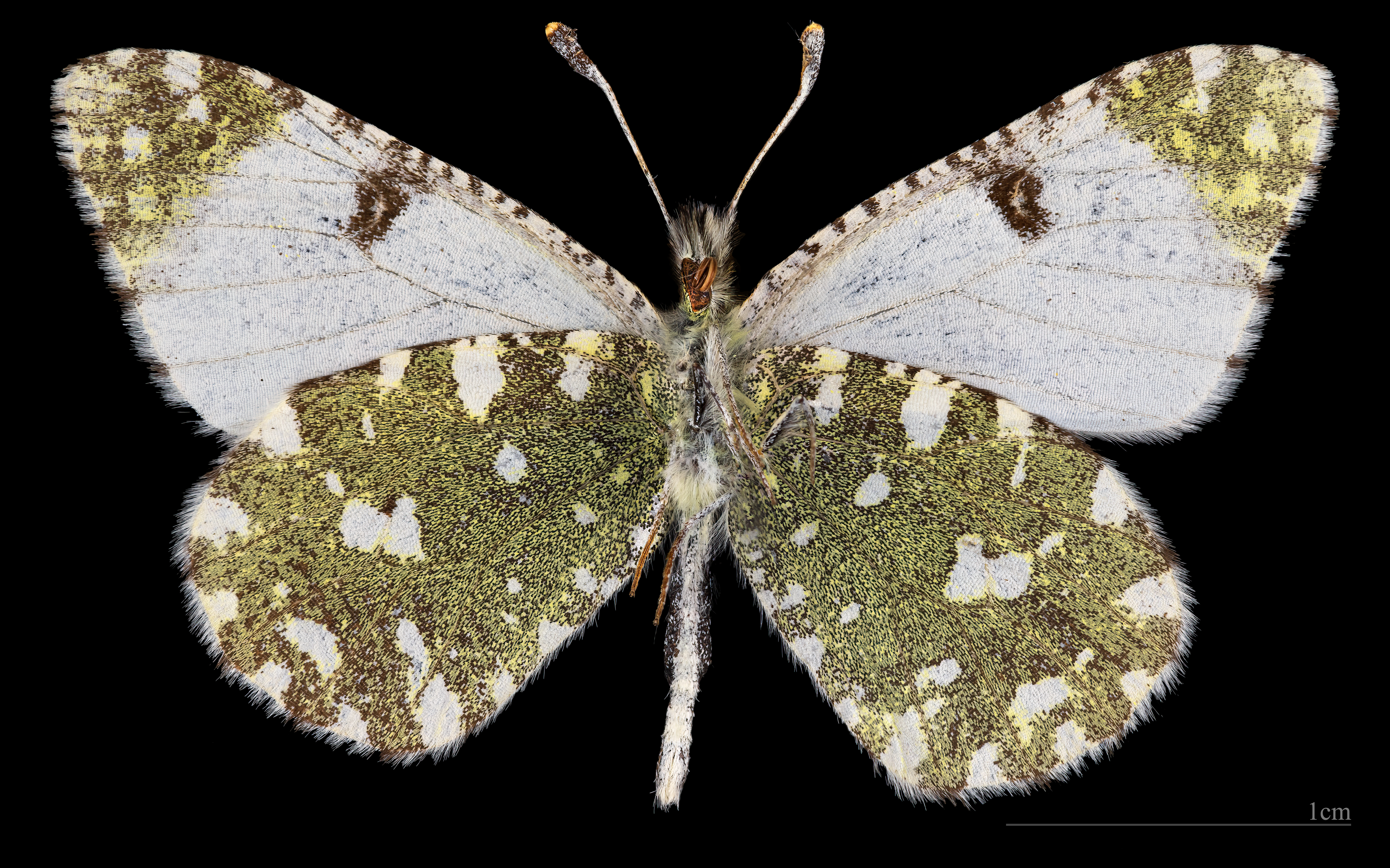
Euchloe tagis castillana ♂ △
