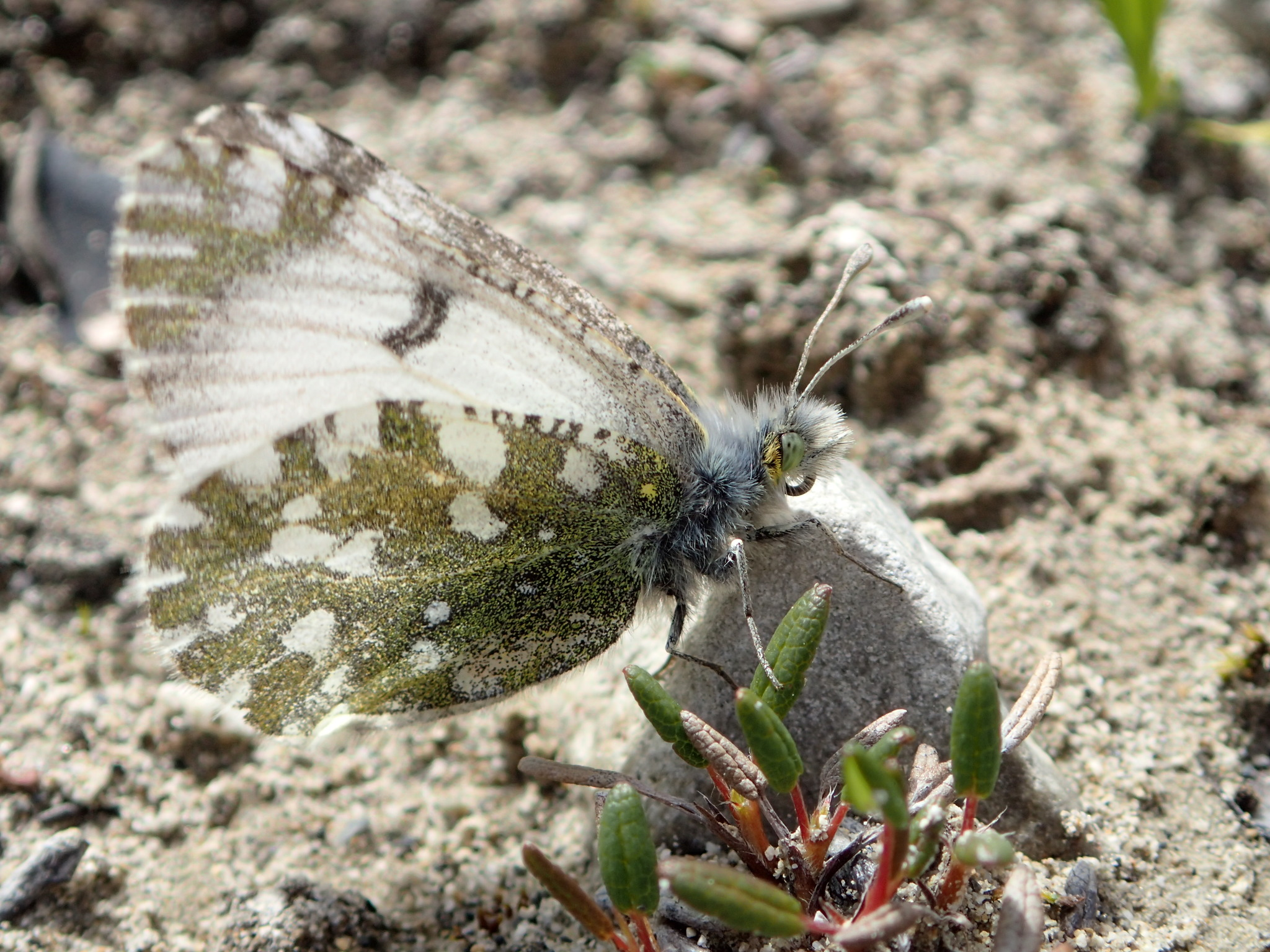

Conservation status
- Apparently Secure (NatureServe)

Scientific classification
- Kingdom: Animalia
- Phylum: Arthropoda
- Clade: Pancrustacea
- Class: Insecta
- Order: Lepidoptera
- Family: Pieridae
- Genus: Euchloe
- Species: E. naina

Binomial name
- Euchloe naina Kozhanchikov, 1923

Subspecies
- Three, see text

= Euchloe naina =

Species of butterfly

Euchloe naina, the green marble, is a species of butterfly that occurs in northern North America and Siberia and has been recorded mainly in the interior of Alaska but has also been recorded on Kodiak by Keith Bruce and verified by Kenelm Philips in 2012.

It is mostly white with black markings on the topside of the forewing tips and body. The underside has greenish-grey veins especially in the hindwing. The wingspan is from 30 to 36 mm. Its habitats include dry barren limestone scree slopes and valley bottoms.

The green marble's flight season in North American is from June 7 to 28.

== Subspecies ==
Listed alphabetically:

- Euchloe naina jakutia Back, 1990
- Euchloe naina naina Kozhantshikov, 1923
- Euchloe naina occidentalis Verity, 1908
