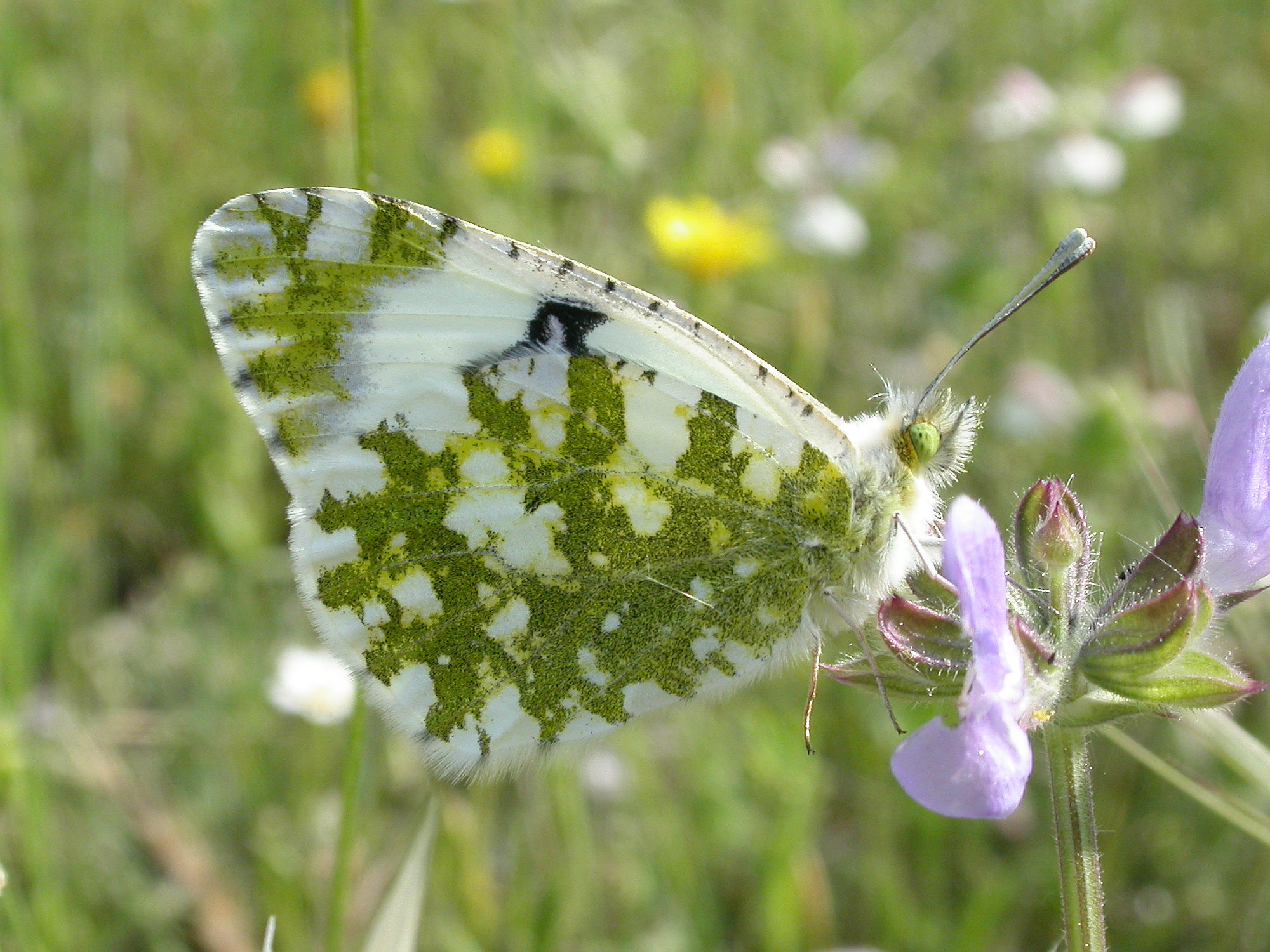
- Western dappled white (Euchloe crameri)
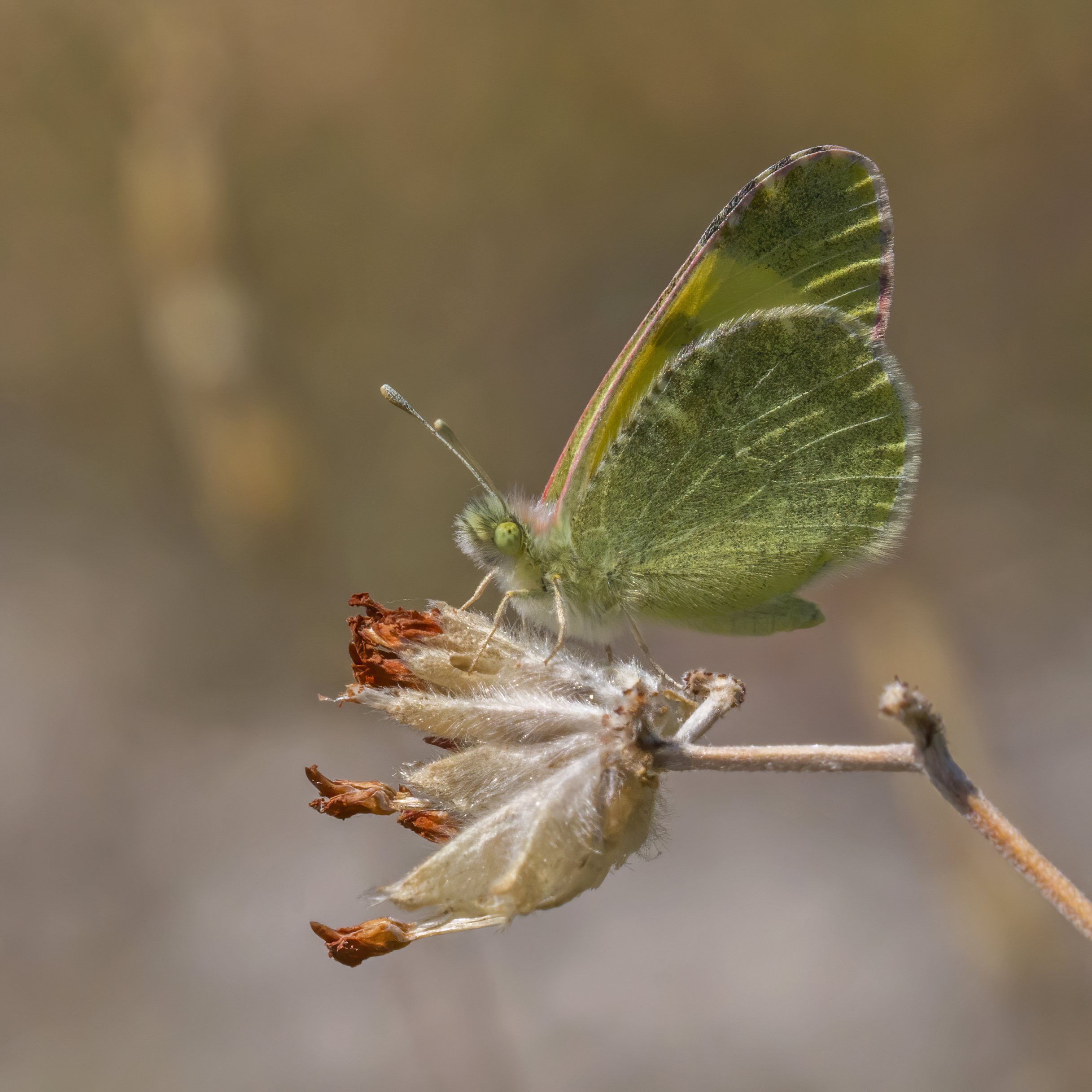
- Eastern greenish black-tip (Euchloe penia)

Scientific classification
- Kingdom: Animalia
- Phylum: Arthropoda
- Clade: Pancrustacea
- Class: Insecta
- Order: Lepidoptera
- Family: Pieridae
- Tribe: Anthocharini
- Genus: Euchloe; Hübner, [1819]

Species
- Several, see text

Synonyms
- Phyllocharis Schatz, [1886]; Elphinstonia Klots, 1930

= Euchloe =

Butterfly genus in family Pieridae

Euchloe is a genus of pierid butterflies from the orangetip tribe (Anthocharini). They are Holarctic in distribution, with most species in Europe, Central Asia, and North America. Like other Anthocharini, the American species are usually called marbles; the Old World species are known as dappled whites.

== Classification ==
Listed alphabetically within groups:
Subgenus Euchloe Hübner, 1819:

- Euchloe ausonia (Hübner, [1803-1804]) – eastern dappled white
- Euchloe ausonides (Lucas, 1852) – large marble or creamy marblewing
- Euchloe belemia (Esper, 1800) – green-striped white
- Euchloe crameri Butler, 1869 – western dappled white
- Euchloe creusa (Doubleday, [1847]) – northern marble
- Euchloe daphalis (Moore, 1865) - Asian Dappled White
- Euchloe falloui (Allard, 1867) - Desert Green-striped White
- Euchloe insularis (Staudinger, 1861)
- Euchloe melanochlorus, Rober, 1907 - Egyptian Dappled White
- Euchloe naina Kozhanchikov, 1923
- Euchloe ogilvia Back, 1990
- Euchloe orientalis (Bremer, 1864)
- Euchloe pulverata (Christoph, 1884)
- Euchloe simplonia (Bloisduval, 1828) – mountain dappled white
- Euchloe tagis (Hübner, [1803-1804]) – Portuguese dappled white

Subgenus Elphinstonia Klots, 1930:

- charlonia species group:
  - Euchloe bazae Fabiano, 1993
  - Euchloe charlonia (Donzel, 1842) – greenish black-tip or lemon white
  - Euchloe lucilla Butler, 1886
  - Euchloe transcaspica (Staudinger, 1891)
  - Euchloe penia (Freyer, 1852)
- tomyris species group:
  - Euchloe lessei Bernardi, 1957
  - Euchloe tomyris Christoph, 1884
  - Euchloe ziayani Leestmans & Back, 2001

Incertae sedis:

- Euchloe aegyptiaca Verity, 1911
- Euchloe falloui (Allard, 1867) – scarce green-striped white
- Euchloe guaymasensis Opler, 1986 – Sonoran marble
- Euchloe hyantis (Edwards, 1871) (sometimes in E. creusa) – California marble or pearly marblewing
- Euchloe lotta Beutenmüller, 1898 (sometimes in E. creusa or E. hyantis) – desert marble
- Euchloe olympia (Edwards, 1871) – Olympia marble
