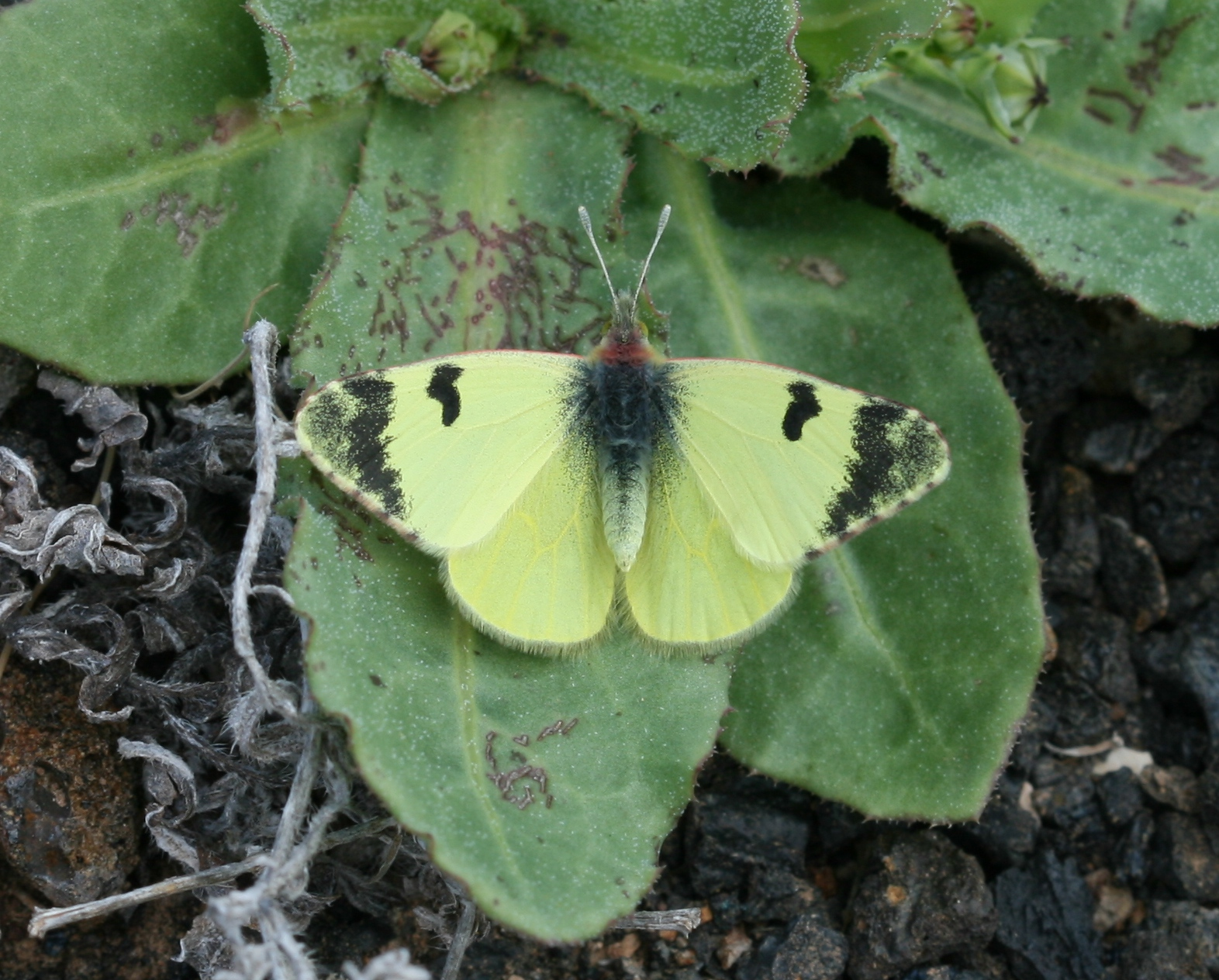

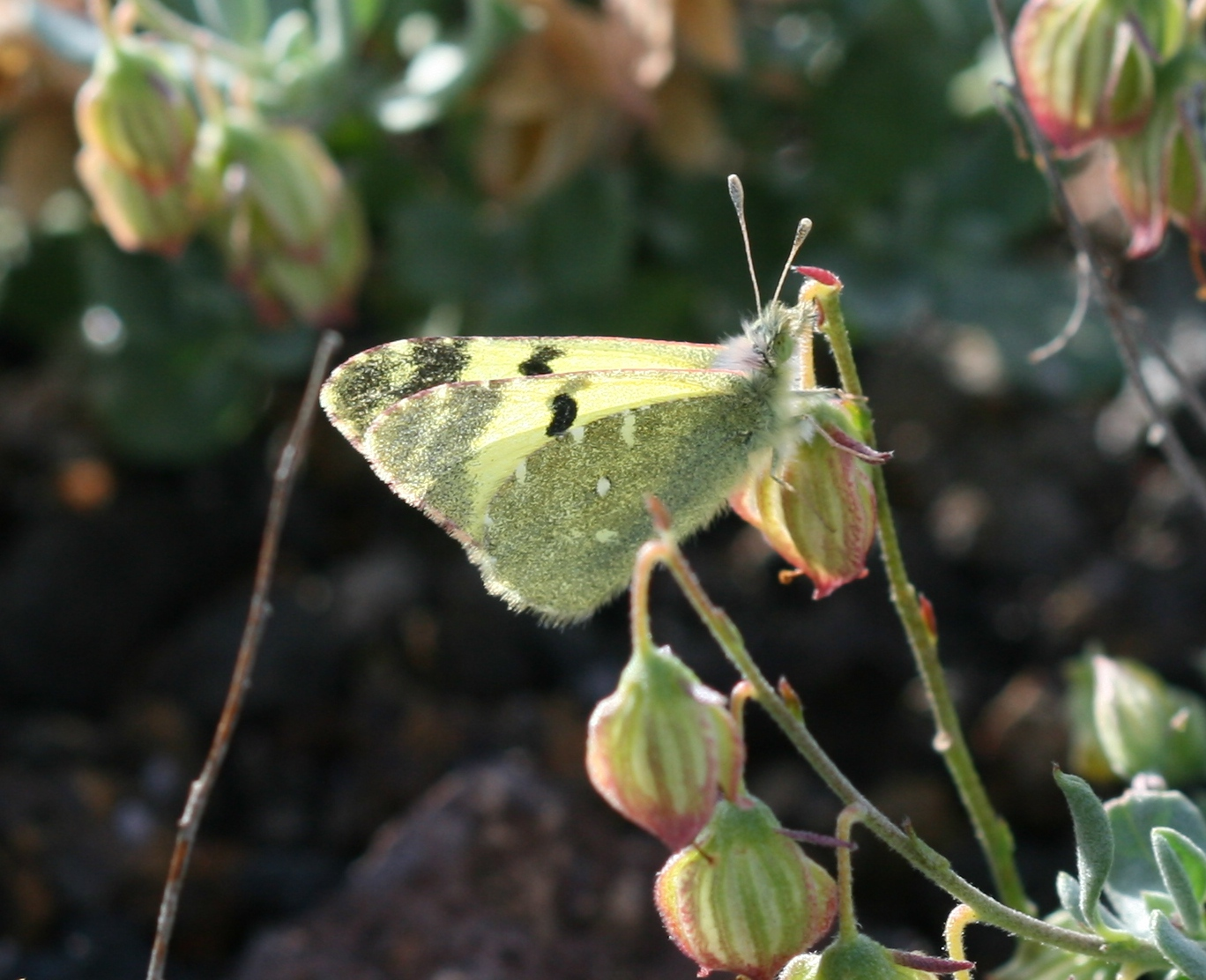

Scientific classification
- Kingdom: Animalia
- Phylum: Arthropoda
- Clade: Pancrustacea
- Class: Insecta
- Order: Lepidoptera
- Family: Pieridae
- Genus: Euchloe
- Species: E. charlonia

Binomial name
- Euchloe charlonia (Donzel, 1842)

Synonyms
- Anthocharis charlonia Donzel, 1842; Anthocharis levaillantii H. Lucas, 1847; Anthocharis charlonia f. atlantica Stauder, 1914; Anthocharis charlonia var. mesopotamica Staudinger, [1892]

= Euchloe charlonia =

Species of butterfly

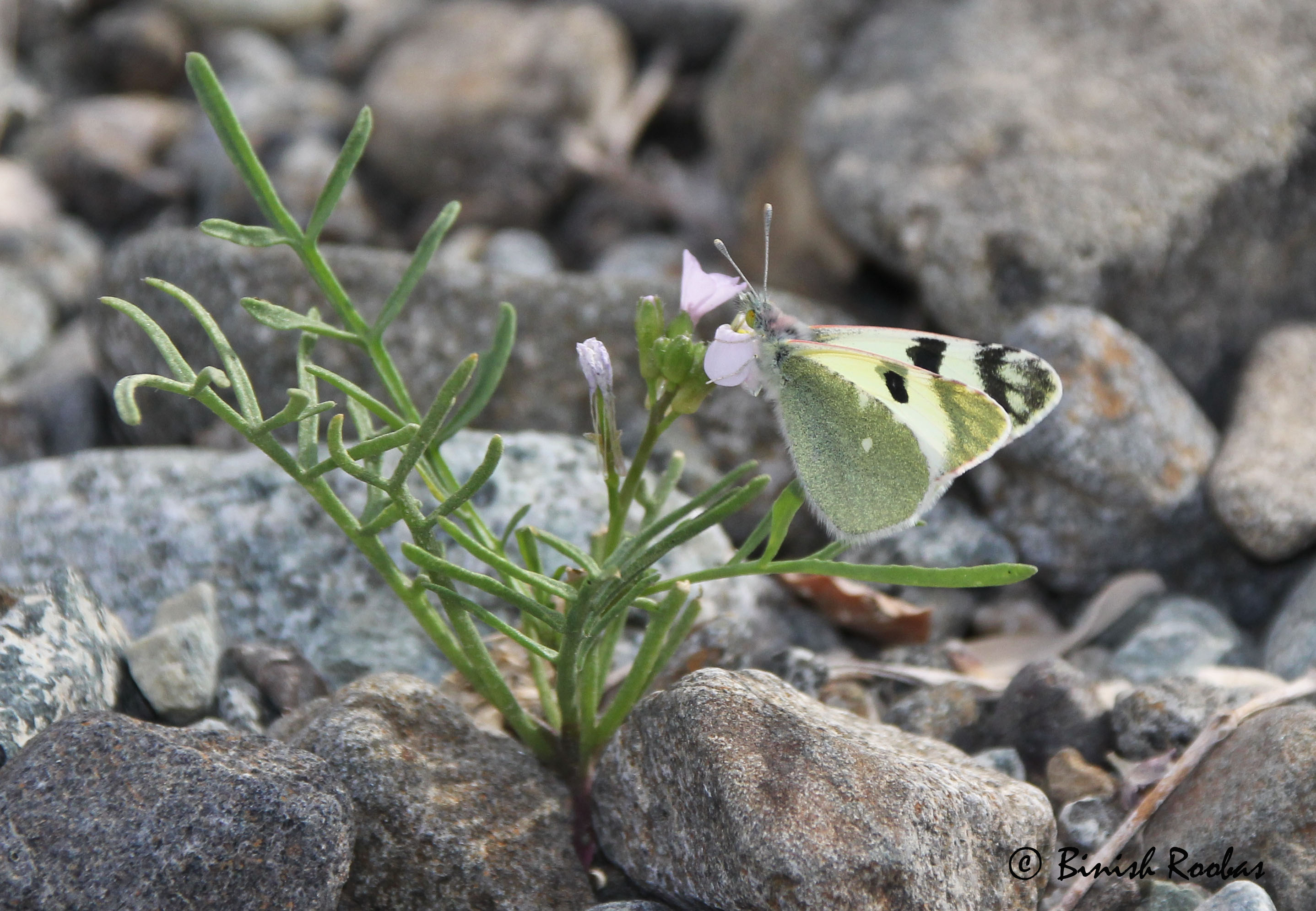
Elphinstonia charlonia from United Arab Emirates

Euchloe charlonia, the greenish black-tip or lemon white, is a butterfly in the family Pieridae. Its range is mainly in northern Africa, the Middle East and occasionally the southern Iberian Peninsula, especially Spain.

The larvae feed on Diplotaxis pendula, Succowia balearica, Moricandia arvensis, Eruca vesicaria, Cleome arabica, Reseda villosa, Eryngium tenue and Diplotaxis acris.

== Subspecies ==
- Euchloe charlonia charlonia (North Africa, Arabia)
- Euchloe charlonia mesopotamica (Staudinger, [1892])
