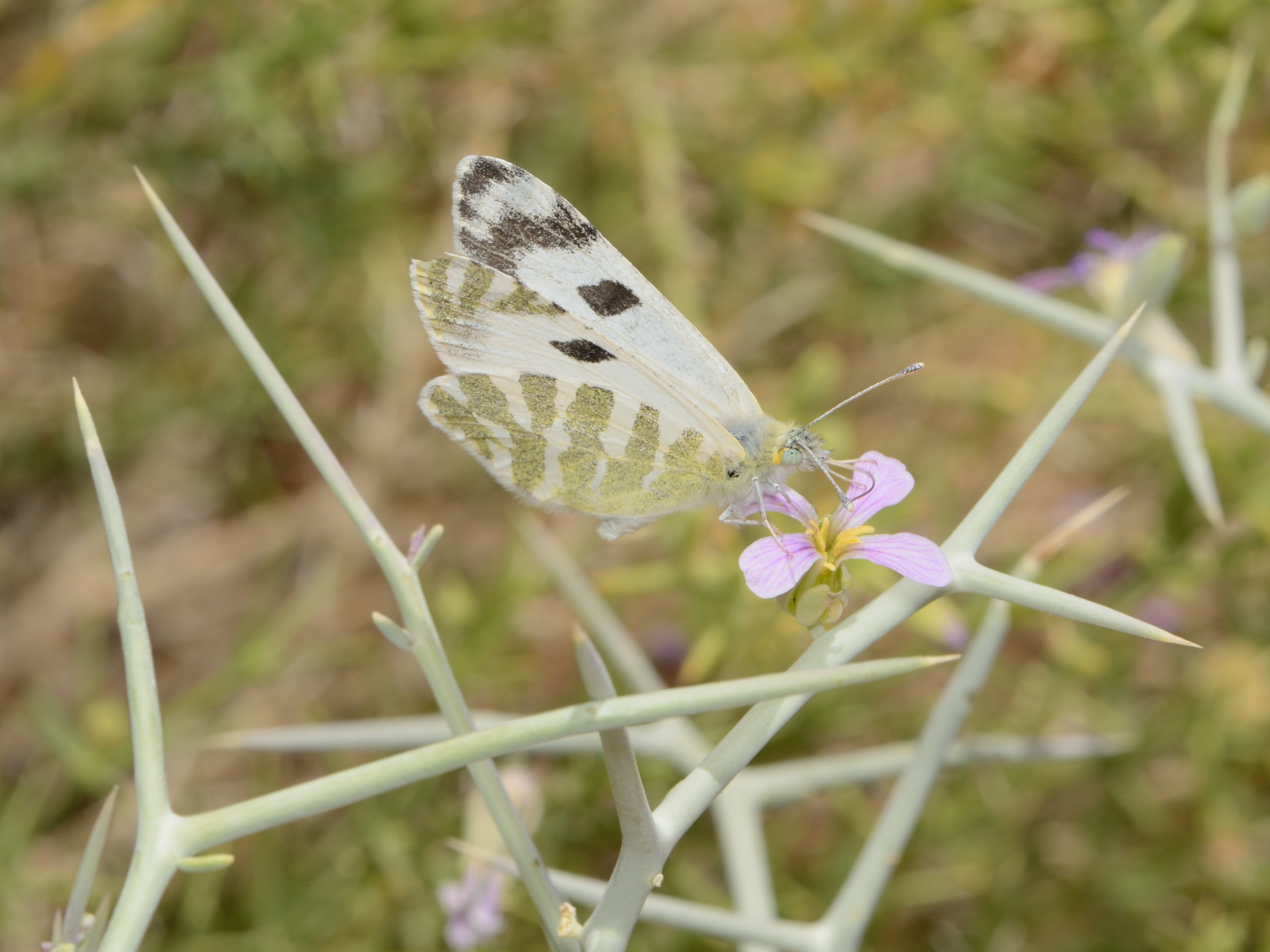
- Female

Scientific classification
- Kingdom: Animalia
- Phylum: Arthropoda
- Class: Insecta
- Order: Lepidoptera
- Family: Pieridae
- Genus: Euchloe
- Species: E. falloui

Binomial name
- Euchloe falloui (Allard, 1867)

Synonyms
- Anthocharis falloui Allard, 1867; Euchloe seitzi Röber, 1907; Euchloe falloui obsolescens Rothschild, 1913; Euchloe falloui lucida Sheljuzuzhko, 1914; Euchloe falloui f. choumovitschi Chnéour, 1935; Euchloe faloui faloui f. nigromarginata Chnéour, 1947; Euchloe faloui faloui f. elisabethae Chnéour, 1947; Euchloe flloui farizae Tarrier, [1993]

= Euchloe falloui =

Scarce green-striped white

Species of butterfly

Euchloe falloui, the scarce green-striped white, is a butterfly in the family Pieridae. It is found in Mauritania, Algeria, Chad, Sudan, Libya, Somalia and Arabia.

The wingspan is 29–34 mm (1.1–1.3 in). Adults are on wing from November to May, usually in two but sometimes in three generations per year.

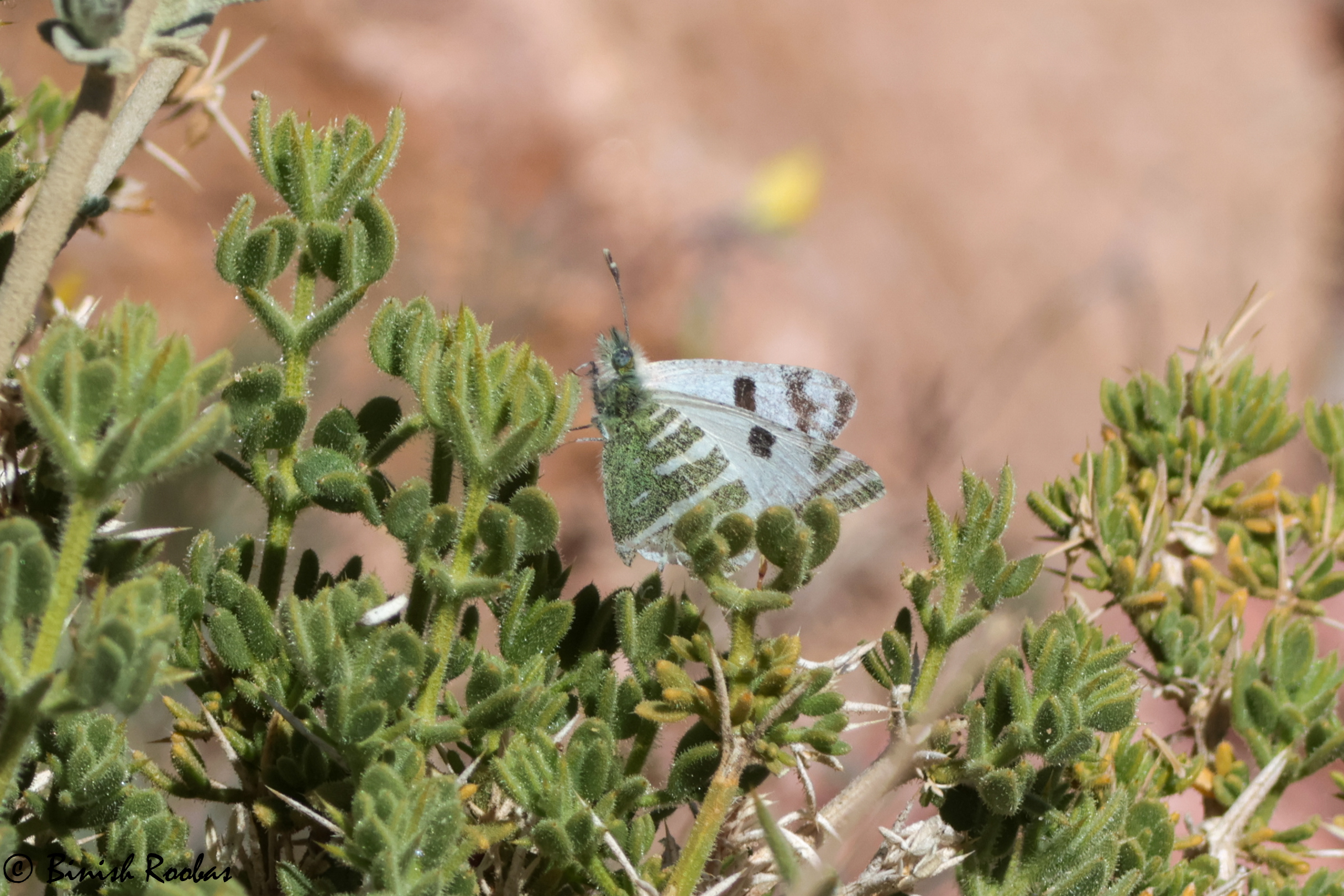
Euchloe falloui from Saudi Arabia

The larvae feed on Moricandia arvensis, Moricandia sinaica, Reseda muricata, Diplotaxis acris, Schouwia thebaica and Zilla spinosa.

== Subspecies ==
- Euchloe falloui falloui (Mauritania, Algeria, Chad, Sudan, Libya, Somalia, Saudi Arabia)
- Euchloe falloui saudi Larsen, 1983 (Saudi Arabia)
