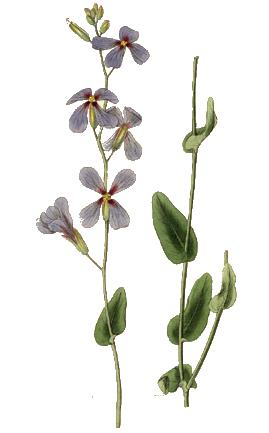
- Moricandia arvensis

Scientific classification
- Kingdom: Plantae
- Clade: Tracheophytes
- Clade: Angiosperms
- Clade: Eudicots
- Clade: Rosids
- Order: Brassicales
- Family: Brassicaceae
- Genus: Moricandia; DC.

Species
- See text

Synonyms
- Moricanda St.-Lag.; Oudneya R.Br.

= Moricandia =

Genus of flowering plants

Moricandia is a genus of plants of the family Brassicaceae. This genus is mainly distributed in North Africa, the Middle East, and Southern Europe. It is associated with arid and semi-arid environments. Flowers of this genus are actinomorphic-dissymmetrical and mostly lilac in color, although they vary from white to purple depending on the species and climatic conditions. Some species show extreme phenotypic plasticity for flower size, shape, and color. The fruits are two-valved dehiscent siliques with one or two sets of seeds per valve.

Moricandia shows high variability in the morphological characters used for identification, making this genus's taxonomy complex and, many times, controversial. Eight species with a variable number of synonymies and subspecies are actually accepted. Moricandia arvensis also known as purple mistress is the most widely distributed species of this genus. Moricandia moricandioides commonly known as violet cabbage, a native of the Mediterranean, is cultivated as a garden flower.

Some species of this genus perform C2 photosynthesis, making them interesting in the engineering of C2 crops.

== Species ==
Eight species are accepted.

- Moricandia arvensis (L.) DC.
- Moricandia foetida Bourg. ex Coss.
- Moricandia moricandioides (Boiss.) Heywood
- Moricandia nitens (Viv.) Durieu & Barr
- Moricandia rytidocarpoides Lorite, Perfectti, Gómez, González-Megías & Abdelaziz
- Moricandia sinaica Boiss.
- Moricandia spinosa Pomel.
- Moricandia suffruticosa (Desf.) Coss. & Durieu

Previously considered a Moricandia species, M. foleyi Batt. is now ascribed to the genus Eruca as Eruca foleyi based in phylogenetic analyses
