= Euxoa hastifera =

Scientific classification
- Domain: Eukaryota
- Kingdom: Animalia
- Phylum: Arthropoda
- Class: Insecta
- Order: Lepidoptera
- Superfamily: Noctuoidea
- Family: Noctuidae
- Genus: Euxoa
- Species: E. hastifera

Binomial name
- Euxoa hastifera (Donzel, 1848)

Synonyms
- Agrotis hastifera Donzel, 1848; Euxoa proleuca Hampson, 1903; Euxoa ambrosiana Boursin, 1927; Euxoa pomazensis Kovacs 1952

Species of moth

Euxoa hastifera is a moth of the family Noctuidae. It is found from southern Europe to Siberia and Tajikistan.

== Description ==
Warren states E. hastifera Donz. (5h). Forewing purplish fuscous; costa broadly pale ochreous to outer line; cell blackish; stigmata outlined with black; orbicular and reniform with brown centres and ochreous rings, the former round: hindwing white, with grey margin. S. Europe, France, Austria, S. Russia, Transylvania:West Asia, Armenia, Asia Minor, Persia and the Altai Mts.

== Subspecies ==
- Euxoa hastifera hastifera
- Euxoa hastifera pomazensis (Hungary)
- Euxoa hastifera abdallah (Portugal, Spain, Morocco)
- Euxoa hastifera geghardica (Armenia)
