= Brassica arvensis =

Brassica arvensis can refer to:

- Brassica arvensis Hablitz, a synonym of Brassica rapa L.
- Brassica arvensis L., a synonym of Moricandia arvensis (L.) DC., purple mistress
- Brassica arvensis (L.) Rabenh., a synonym of Rhamphospermum arvense (L.) Andrz. ex Besser, field mustard
