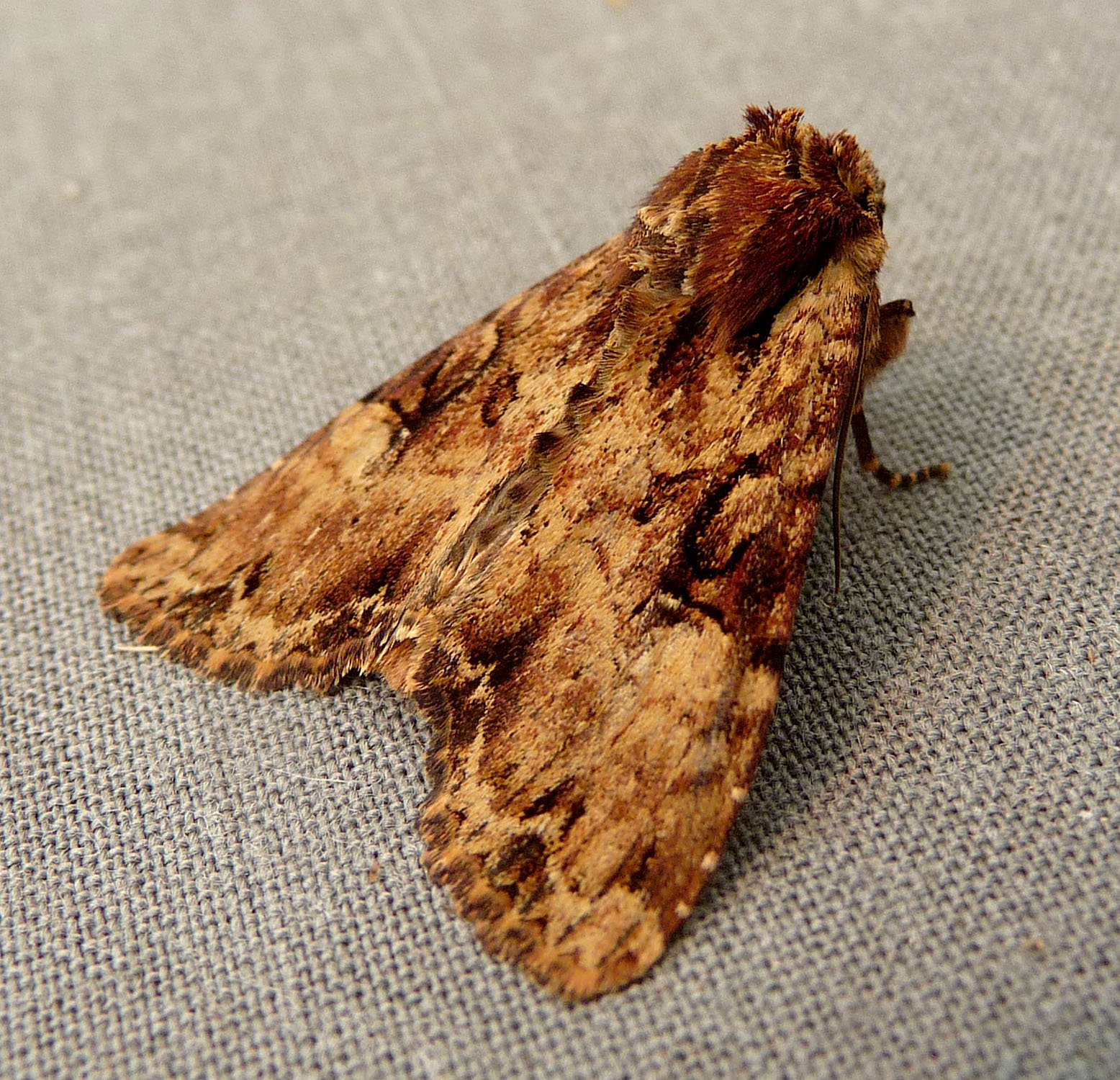

Scientific classification
- Kingdom: Animalia
- Phylum: Arthropoda
- Class: Insecta
- Order: Lepidoptera
- Superfamily: Noctuoidea
- Family: Noctuidae
- Genus: Apamea
- Species: A. epomidion

Binomial name
- Apamea epomidion (Haworth, 1809)

Synonyms
- Apamea characterea Denis & Schiffermüller, 1775; Noctua epomidion Haworth, 1809; Xylina nux Freyer, 1842; Xylophasia hepatica (Linnaeus)

= Apamea epomidion =

Species of moth

Apamea epomidion, the clouded brindle, is a moth of the family Noctuidae, sub-family Hadeninae. The species was first described by Adrian Hardy Haworth in 1809. It is found throughout continental Europe, the British Isles, Sweden and Central Asia. It is also found in the Altai Mountains, west Siberia, and in Amur.

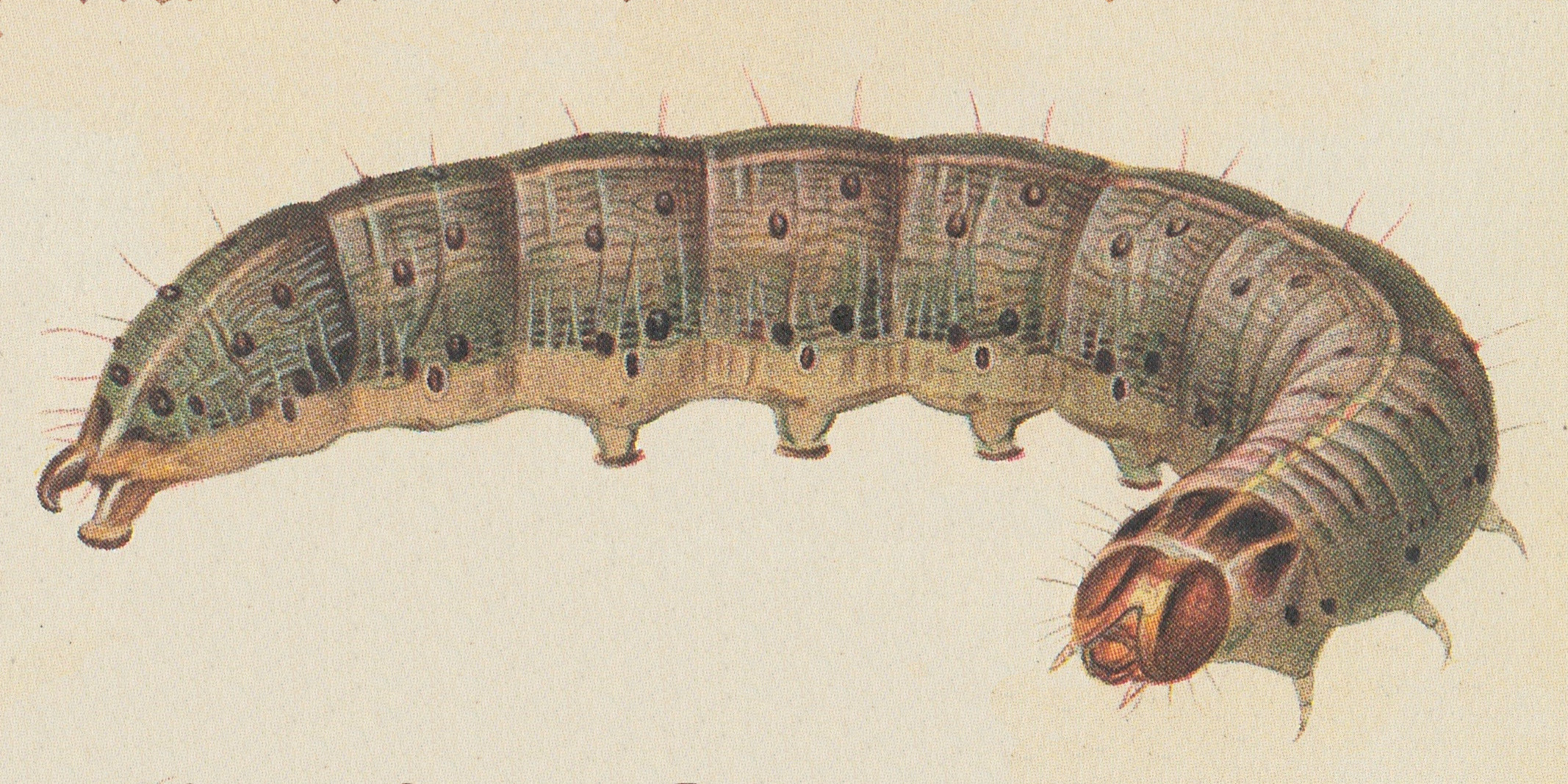
Caterpillar

The wingspan is 40–46 mm. Forewing grey brown or pale liver coloured; inner and outer lines double, obscurely marked; a thick black streak from base below cell, and a more diffuse one obliquely below it above inner margin; claviform stigma small, with black outline; orbicular oblique with brown centre and pale ring; reniform pale, defined only on its inner edge by a brown line with a pale dot at lower end, the cell between them dark brown; submarginal line pale, indented on each fold, preceded by black blotches on costa and on the folds and followed by dark marks on the latter only; hindwing brownish fuscous, paler towards base, with dark cell spot; very frequently the whole forewing is suffused with reddish brown, throwing up the paler transverse markings; this is the form characterea Hbn. - an extreme development of this, with the basal area above the black streak remaining prominently pale is the ab. epomidion Haw.;- alopecuroides Spul., from the Bukowina, denotes a form in which the whole forewing is red-brown, as in the form of rurea F. called alopecurus Esp.; - discrepans Stgr., [Now ssp. of Apamea aquila Donzel, 1837] from the Ussuri, is described as being much darker, the forewings coloured as in gemina Hbn.

The moth flies in June and July.

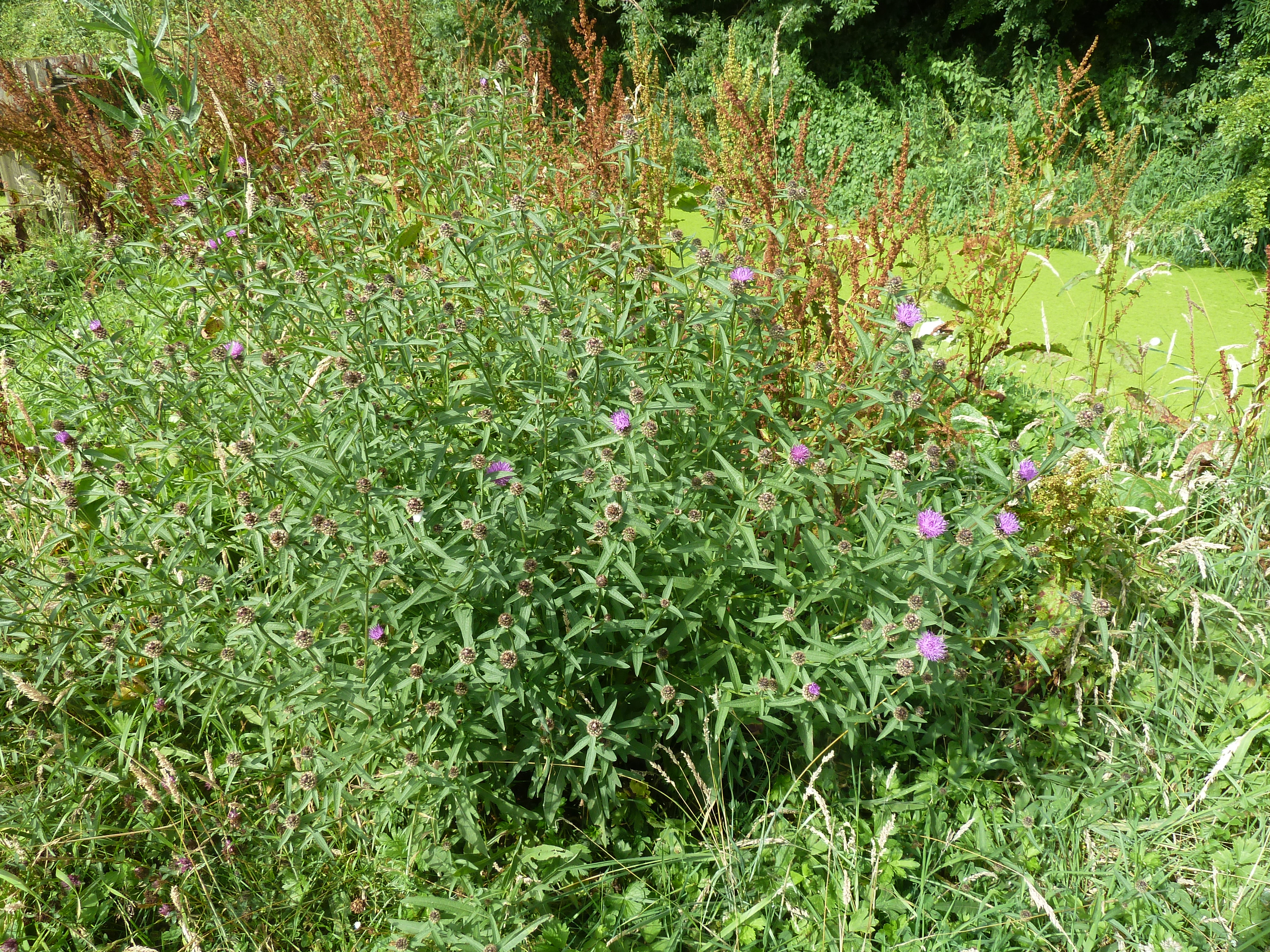
Habitat in Ireland

The larvae feed on grasses and other low plants.
