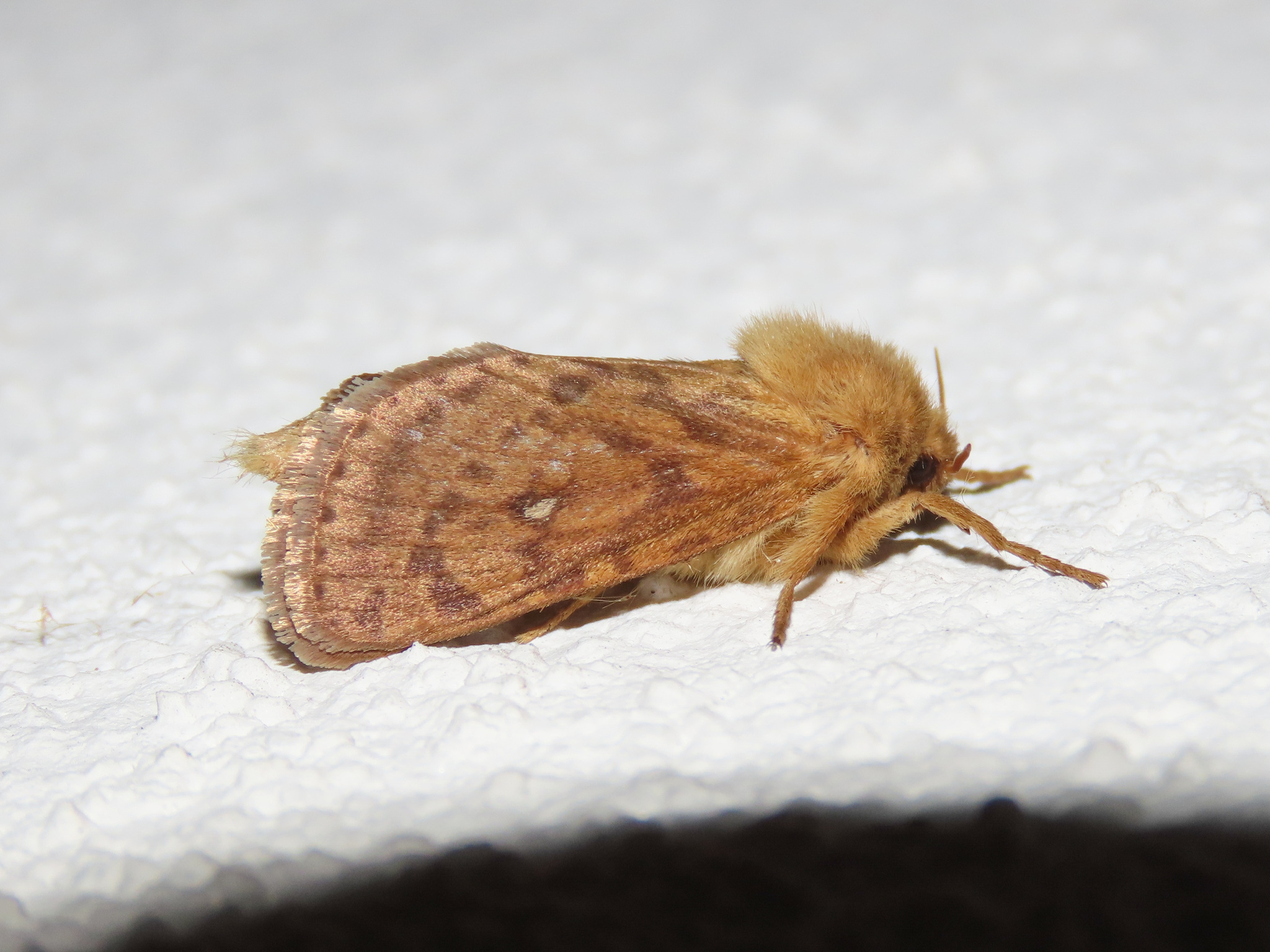

Scientific classification
- Kingdom: Animalia
- Phylum: Arthropoda
- Clade: Pancrustacea
- Class: Insecta
- Order: Lepidoptera
- Family: Hepialidae
- Genus: Pharmacis
- Species: P. aemilianus

Binomial name
- Pharmacis aemilianus (Constantini, 1911)

Synonyms
- Hepialus aemilianus Constantini, 1911; Pharmacis emilianus Turati, 1923

= Pharmacis aemilianus =

Species of moth

Pharmacis aemilianus is a moth of the family Hepialidae. It is known from Italy.
