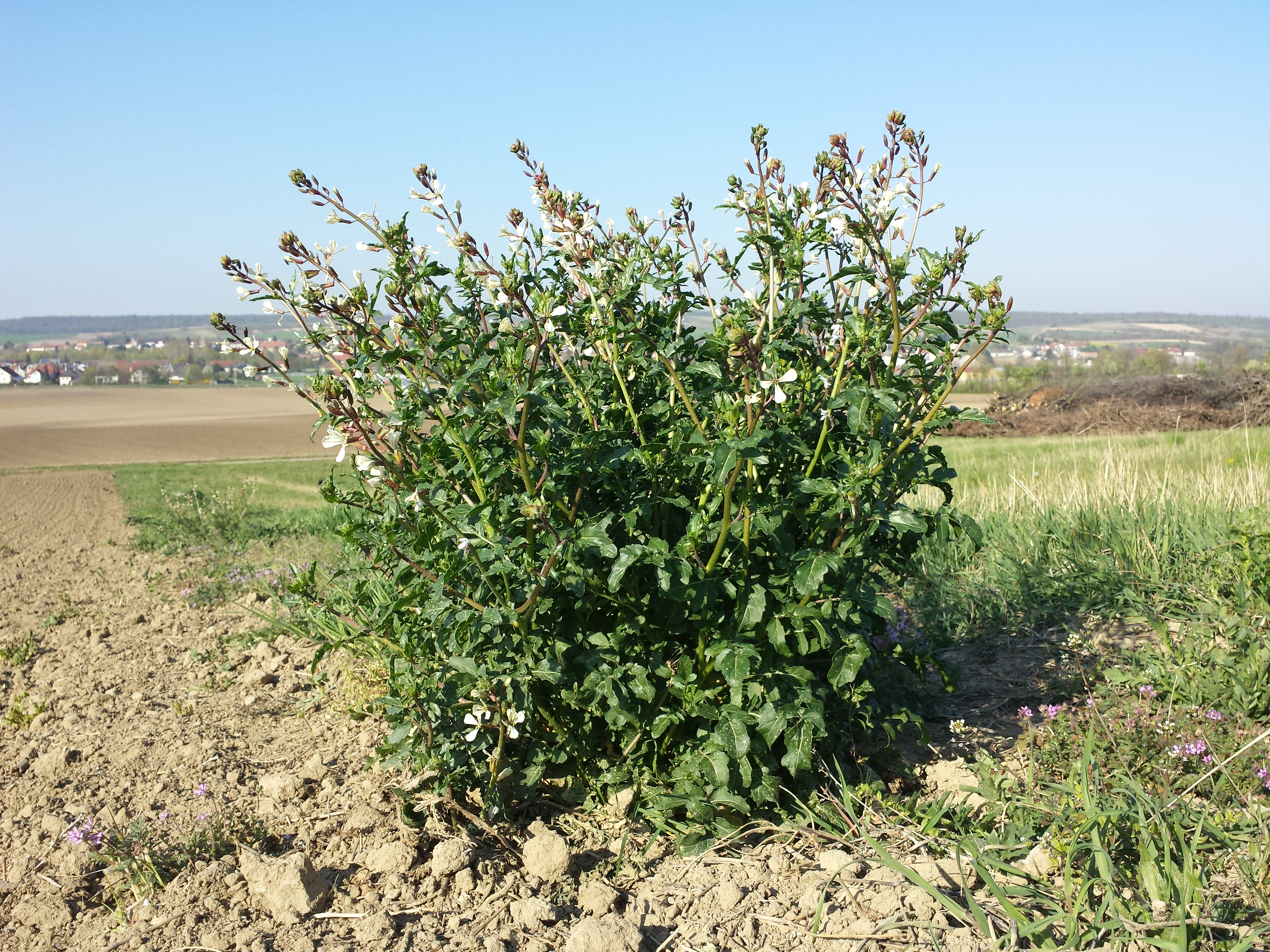

Scientific classification
- Kingdom: Plantae
- Clade: Tracheophytes
- Clade: Angiosperms
- Clade: Eudicots
- Clade: Rosids
- Order: Brassicales
- Family: Brassicaceae
- Genus: Eruca
- Species: E. sativa

Binomial name
- Eruca sativa Mill.

Synonyms
- Brassica eruca L.; Brassica erucoides Hornem.; Brassica hispida Ten.; Brassica lativalvis Boiss.; Brassica sativa (Mill.) Y.Z.Zhao; Brassica turgida Pers.; Brassica uechtritziana Janka; Crucifera eruca E.H.L.Krause; Eruca cappadocica Reut. ex Boiss.; Eruca cappadocica Reut.; Eruca cappadocica var. eriocarpa Boiss.; Eruca eruca (L.) Asch. & Graebn.; Eruca foetida Moench; Eruca glabrescens Jord.; Eruca glabrescens var. valverdensis Pit.; Eruca grandiflora Cav.; Eruca hispida (Ten.) DC.; Eruca lativalvis Boiss.; Eruca longirostris var. leptocarpa Pau; Eruca longistyla Pomel; Eruca oleracea J.St.-Hil.; Eruca orthosepala (Lange) Lange; Eruca permixta Jord.; Eruca ruchetta Spach; Eruca sativa var. dasycarpa Rouy & Foucaud; Eruca sativa var. eriocarpa (Boiss.) Post; Eruca sativa proles glabrescens (Jord.) Rouy & Foucaud; Eruca sativa var. hispida Rouy & Foucaud; Eruca sativa var. hispida (Ten.) J.Groves; Eruca sativa subsp. lativalvis (Boiss.) Greuter & Burdet; Eruca sativa proles permixta (Jord.) Rouy & Foucaud; Eruca sativa var. polysperma Rouy; Eruca stenocarpa var. major Rouy; Eruca subbipinnata Chiov.; Eruca sylvestris Bubani; Eruca vesicaria var. cappadocica (Reut. ex Boiss.) P.Fourn.; Eruca vesicaria subvar. hispida (Ten.) Thell.; Eruca vesicaria subsp. lativalvis (Boiss.) Thell.; Eruca vesicaria subvar. oleracea (J.St.-Hil.) Emb. & Maire; Eruca vesicaria var. orthosepala Lange; Eruca vesicaria var. sativa (Mill.) Thell.; Eruca vesicaria subsp. sativa (Mill.) Thell.; Euzomum hispidum Link; Euzomum sativum Link; Raphanus eruca (L.) Crantz; Sinapis eruca (L.) Vest; Sinapis exotica DC.

= Eruca sativa =

Edible annual plant

Eruca sativa (also known as arugula, rocket, or eruca,) is an edible annual plant in the family Brassicaceae. Other common names include salad rocket, garden rocket, colewort, roquette, ruchetta, rucola, rucoli, and rugula.

Eruca sativa is native to the Mediterranean and Asia. Its wide availability and sharp flavor (slightly bitter and peppery) make it widely popular as a leaf vegetable, including in salads.

== Description ==
Eruca sativa is an annual plant growing to 20 to 100 cm (8 to 40 in) in height. The pinnate leaves are deeply lobed with four to ten small, lateral lobes and a large terminal lobe. The flowers are 2 to 4 cm (3/4 to 1 1/2 in) in diameter, arranged in a corymb, with the typical Brassicaceae flower structure. The petals are creamy white with purple veins, and the stamens are yellow. The fruit is a siliqua (pod) 12 to 25 mm (1/2 to 1 in) long with an apical beak, containing several seeds. The species has a chromosome number of 2n = 22.

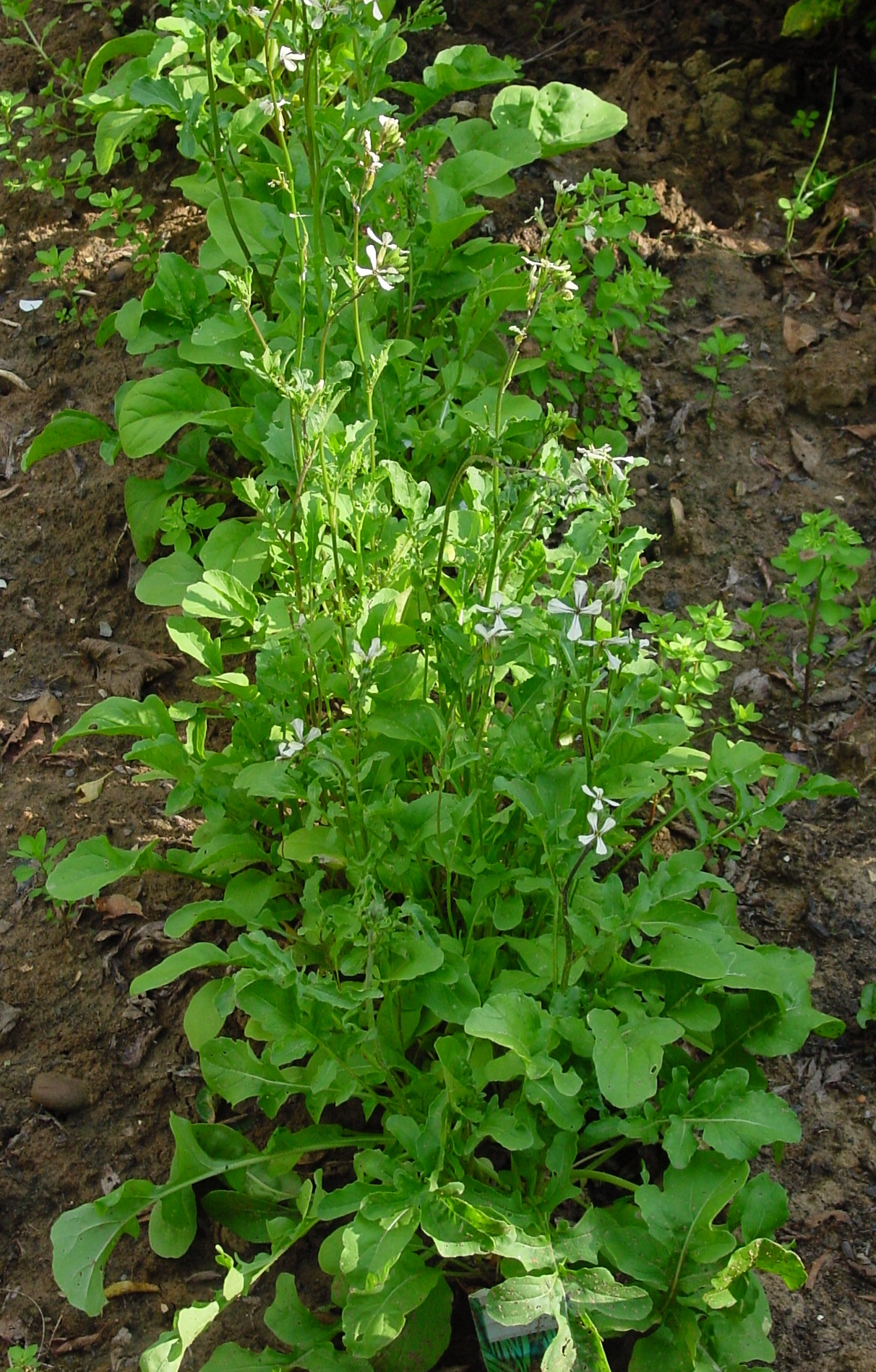
Young plants

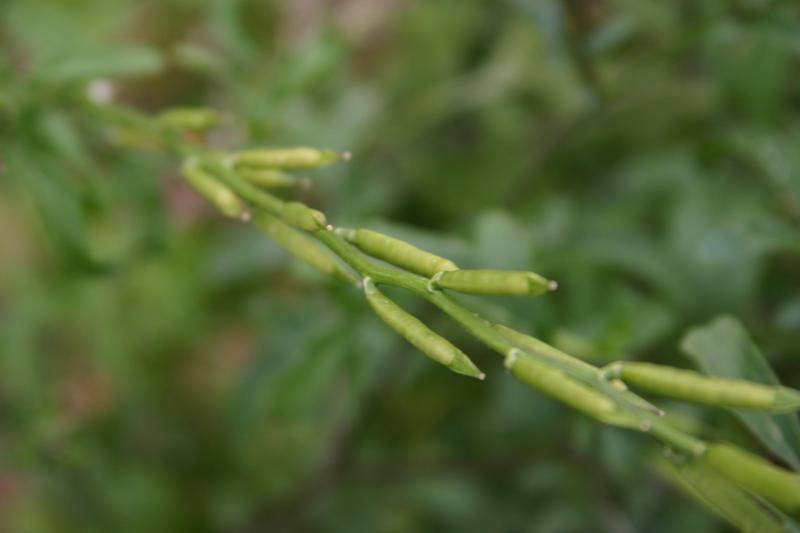
Seed pods

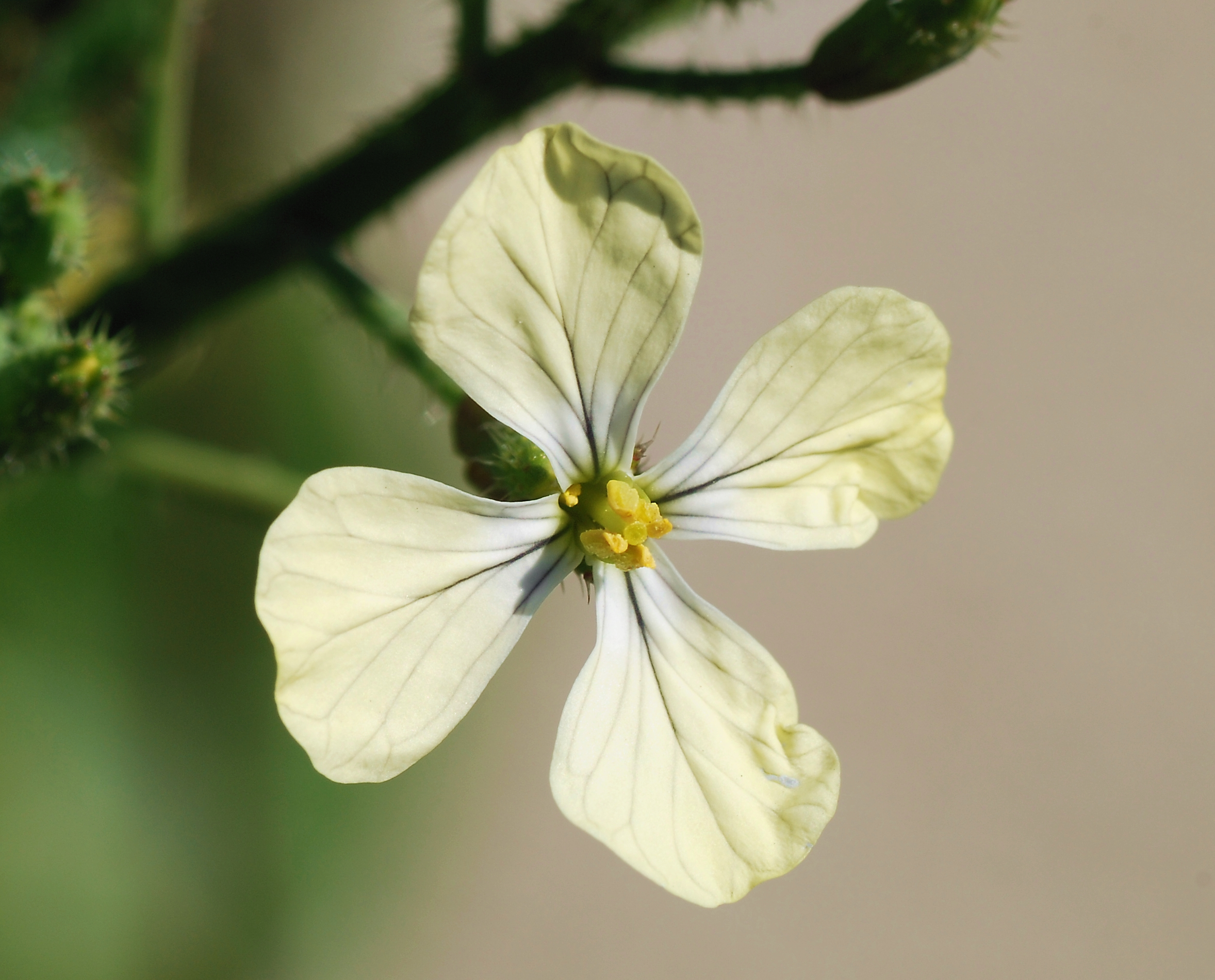
Flower

== Taxonomy ==
Some botanists consider E. sativa a subspecies of Eruca vesicaria. However, they are different in many morphological aspects, such as sepal persistence, silique shape, and habit. Most importantly, they do not hybridize freely with each other as there is partial reproductive isolation between them. The Plants of the World Online database has accepted Eruca sativa as a distinct species.

=== Etymology ===
The species name sativa is from Latin supine satum, meaning "sown, planted", indicating that the plant is cultivated in gardens.

The English common name rocket derives from French roquette, itself a borrowing from Italian ruchetta, a diminutive of ruca, from the Latin word eruca, meaning "caterpillar".

"Arugula" (/əˈruːɡələ/), the common name now widespread in the United States and Canada, entered American English from a nonstandard dialect of Italian. The standard Italian word is "rucola". The Oxford English Dictionary dates the first known appearance of "arugula" in American English to a 1960 article in The New York Times by food editor and prolific cookbook writer Craig Claiborne.

==== Similarly named plants ====
Rocket is sometimes conflated with Diplotaxis tenuifolia, known as 'perennial wall rocket', another plant of the family Brassicaceae that is used in the same manner. Species of Barbarea may be known as 'yellow rocket'.

== Distribution and habitat ==
Eruca sativa is native to parts of the Mediterranean and Asia, including southern Europe, North Africa and the Middle East.

== Ecology ==
The species typically grows on dry, disturbed ground. It is a source of food for the larvae of some moth species, including the garden carpet. Its roots are susceptible to nematode infestation.

As an invasive species, Eruca sativa is widespread and scattered, but is prolific and noxious in the Sonoran desert of Arizona and California.

== Cultivation ==
The plant was traditionally collected in the wild or grown in home gardens along with herbs, such as parsley and basil. Arugula is grown commercially and is naturalized as a wild plant outside its native range in temperate regions around the world, including northern Europe and North America.

Arugula prefers full sun, cool temperatures, and moist, fertile soil. Hot weather changes its flavor and stops leaf growth. Seedlings are planted 6 in (15 cm) apart, and plants can self-seed in the garden. Plants mature and can be harvested within 40 to 50 days, with young leaves preferred for flavor.

Mild frost conditions hinder the plant's growth and turn the green leaves to red.

Arugula, raw
Nutritional value per 100 g (3.5 oz)
- Energy: 105 kJ (25 kcal)
- Carbohydrates: 3.6 g
- Sugars: 2.0 g
- Dietary fibre: 1.6 g
- Fat: 0.6 g
- Protein: 2.6 g
Vitamins and minerals
Vitamins	Quantity %DV^{†}
Vitamin A equiv. beta-Carotene lutein zeaxanthin	13% 119 μg 13% 1424 μg 3555 μg
Vitamin A	2373 IU
Thiamine (B1)	4% 0.044 mg
Riboflavin (B2)	7% 0.086 mg
Niacin (B3)	2% 0.305 mg
Vitamin B6	4% 0.073 mg
Folate (B9)	24% 97 μg
Vitamin C	17% 15 mg
Vitamin E	3% 0.43 mg
Vitamin K	91% 108.6 μg
Minerals	Quantity %DV^{†}
Calcium	12% 160 mg
Copper	8% 0.076 mg
Iron	8% 1.46 mg
Magnesium	11% 47 mg
Manganese	14% 0.321 mg
Phosphorus	4% 52 mg
Potassium	12% 369 mg
Sodium	1% 27 mg
Zinc	4% 0.47 mg
- Other constituents: Quantity
- Water: 91.7 g
- Full Link to USDA database entry
- ^{†}Percentages estimated using US recommendations for adults, except for potassium, which is estimated based on expert recommendation from the National Academies.

== Uses ==
=== Nutrition ===
Raw arugula is 92% water, 4% carbohydrates, 2.5% protein, and contains a negligible amount of fat (table). In a reference amount of 100 grams (3.5 oz), arugula provides 25 calories of food energy, and is a rich source (20% or more of the Daily Value, DV) of folate and vitamin K. It is also a good source (10–19% of DV) of vitamin A, vitamin C, and the dietary minerals, calcium, magnesium, manganese, and potassium (table).

=== Culinary ===
The leaves, flowers, young seed pods, and mature seeds are all edible.

Since Roman times in Italy, raw arugula has been added to salads. It often is added as a garnish to a pizza at the end of or just after baking. In Apulia, in southern Italy, arugula is cooked to make the pasta dish "cavatiéddi", "in which large amounts of coarsely chopped arugula are added to pasta seasoned with a homemade reduced tomato sauce and pecorino", as well as in many recipes in which it is chopped and added to sauces and cooked dishes or in a sauce (made by frying it in olive oil with garlic). It also is used as a condiment for cold meats and fish. Throughout Italy, it is used as a salad with tomatoes and with burrata, bocconcini, buffalo, or mozzarella cheese. In Rome, "rucola" is used in "straccetti", a dish of thin slices of beef with raw arugula and Parmesan cheese. Arugula is also used in the rucola style of amaro produced in southern Campania in areas such as Amalfi coast, Cilento coast and Ischia; examples include See the Elephant Amaro.

In Turkey, similarly, the plant is eaten raw as a side dish or salad with fish or is served with a sauce of extra virgin olive oil and lemon juice.

In Slovenia, arugula often is combined with boiled potatoes or used in a soup.

In West Asia, Pakistan, and northern India, Eruca seeds are pressed to make taramira oil, used in pickling and (after aging to remove acridity) as a salad or cooking oil. The seed cake is also used as animal feed. It is cultivated in the Pothohar region of Pakistan. During the early growth stage (the first two months), its green leaves and yellow flowers are cooked as a local dish known as Jamah ka Saag.

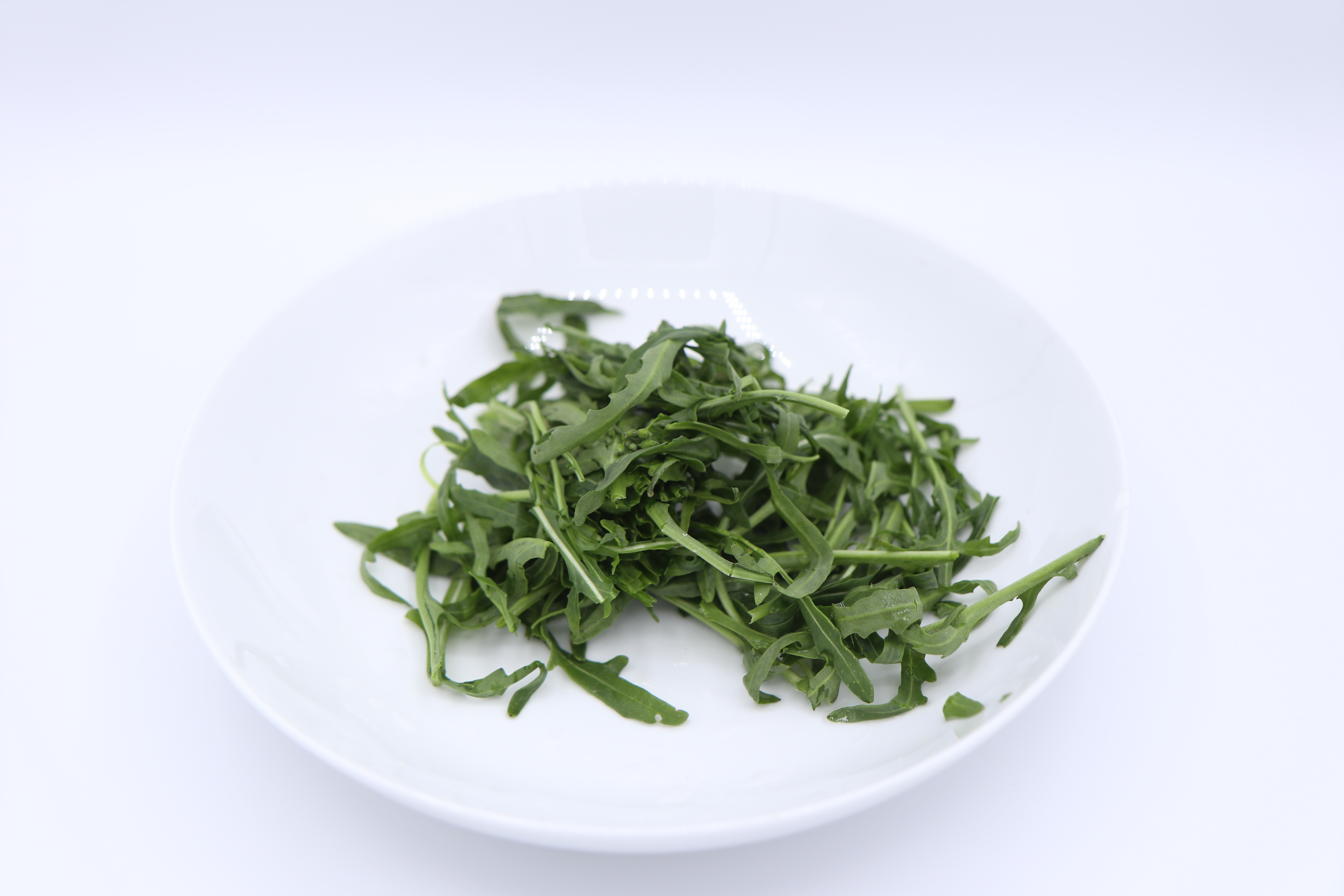
Salad bowl of arugula leaves

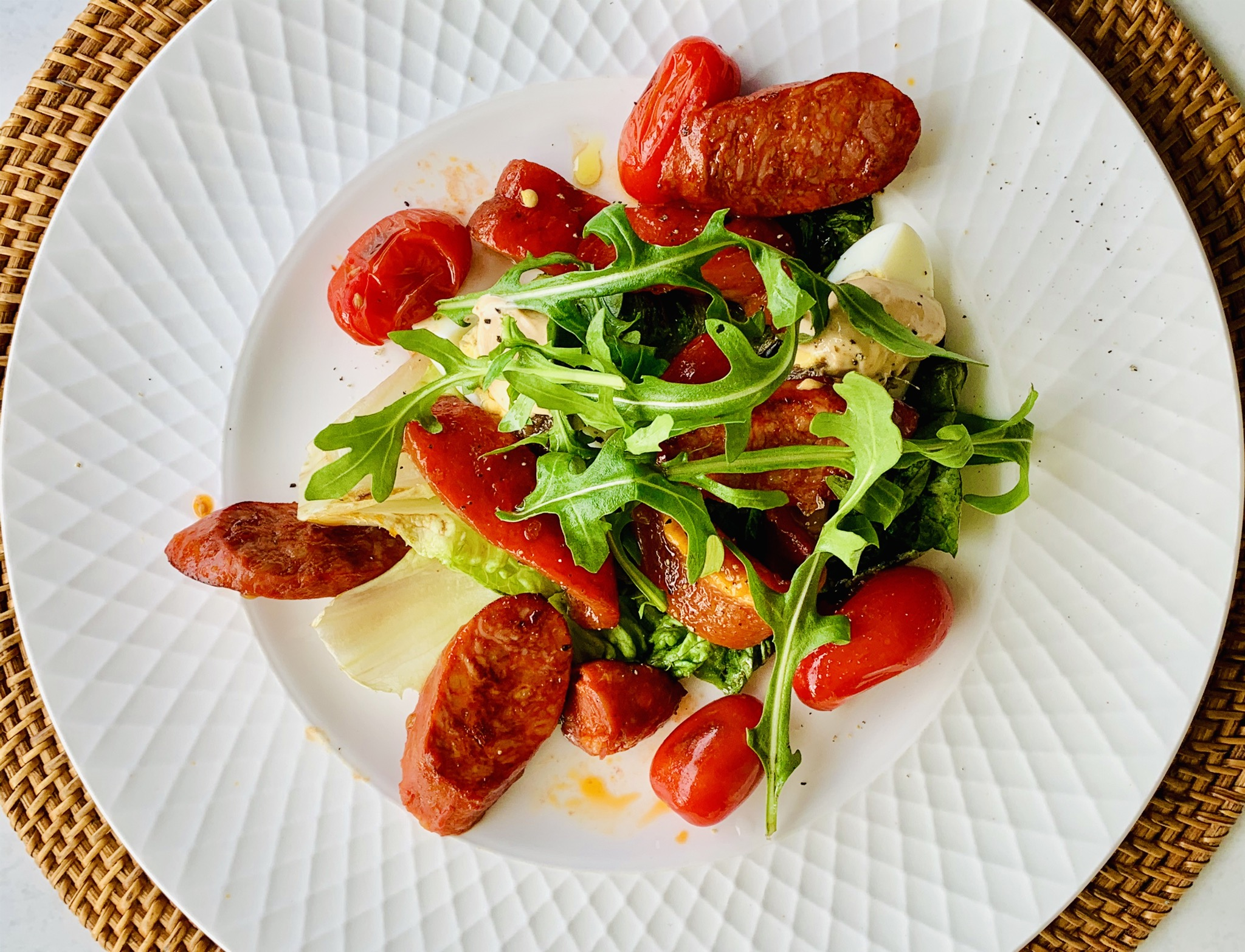
Arugula in a savory salad
