= Taramira oil =

Oil from arugula seeds

Taramira oil or jamba oil, is a seed oil, pressed from the seeds of the arugula (Eruca sativa). Because the plant is highly drought resistant, the oil is popular in regions of poor rainfall, particularly in West Asia, Pakistan and Northern India.

== Uses ==
The oil is highly pungent and, upon extraction, acrid. The pungency differs from that of mustard oil, although taramira oil can be used to make a sort of mustard. In India, the oil is used for pickling, after aging to reduce the acridity, as a salad or cooking oil.

The oil is also used as a massage oil and to soothe the skin. The seed cake, a byproduct of oil production, is also of use as animal feed.
