= Pharmacis castillanus =

Scientific classification
- Domain: Eukaryota
- Kingdom: Animalia
- Phylum: Arthropoda
- Class: Insecta
- Order: Lepidoptera
- Family: Hepialidae
- Genus: Pharmacis
- Species: P. castillanus

Binomial name
- Pharmacis castillanus (Oberthur, 1883)

Synonyms
- Hepialus castillanus Oberthur, 1883

Species of moth

Pharmacis castillanus is a moth of the family Hepialidae. It is known from Spain.
