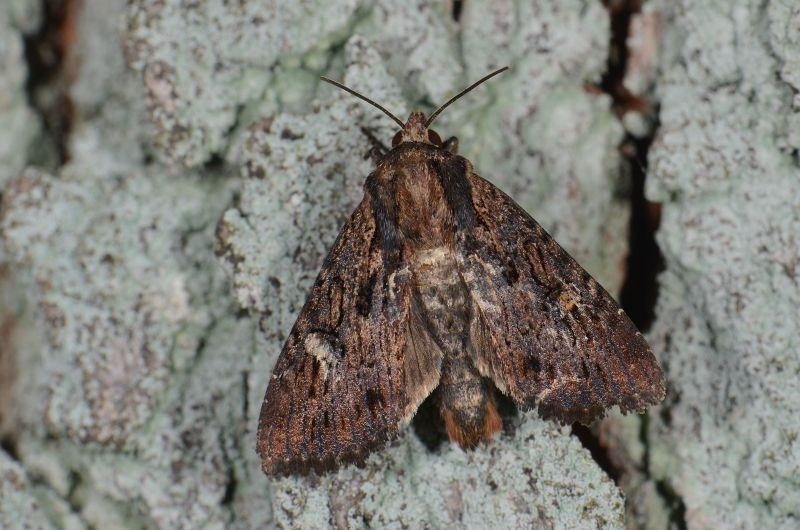

Scientific classification
- Domain: Eukaryota
- Kingdom: Animalia
- Phylum: Arthropoda
- Class: Insecta
- Order: Lepidoptera
- Superfamily: Noctuoidea
- Family: Noctuidae
- Genus: Apamea
- Species: A. aquila

Binomial name
- Apamea aquila Donzel, 1837

= Apamea aquila =

Species of moth

Apamea aquila is a species of moth belonging to the family Noctuidae.

It is native to Europe and Japan.
