= Pharmacis claudiae =

Scientific classification
- Kingdom: Animalia
- Phylum: Arthropoda
- Clade: Pancrustacea
- Class: Insecta
- Order: Lepidoptera
- Family: Hepialidae
- Genus: Pharmacis
- Species: P. claudiae

Binomial name
- Pharmacis claudiae Kristal and Hirneisen, 1994

Species of moth

Pharmacis claudiae is a moth of the family Hepialidae. It is known from Italy.
