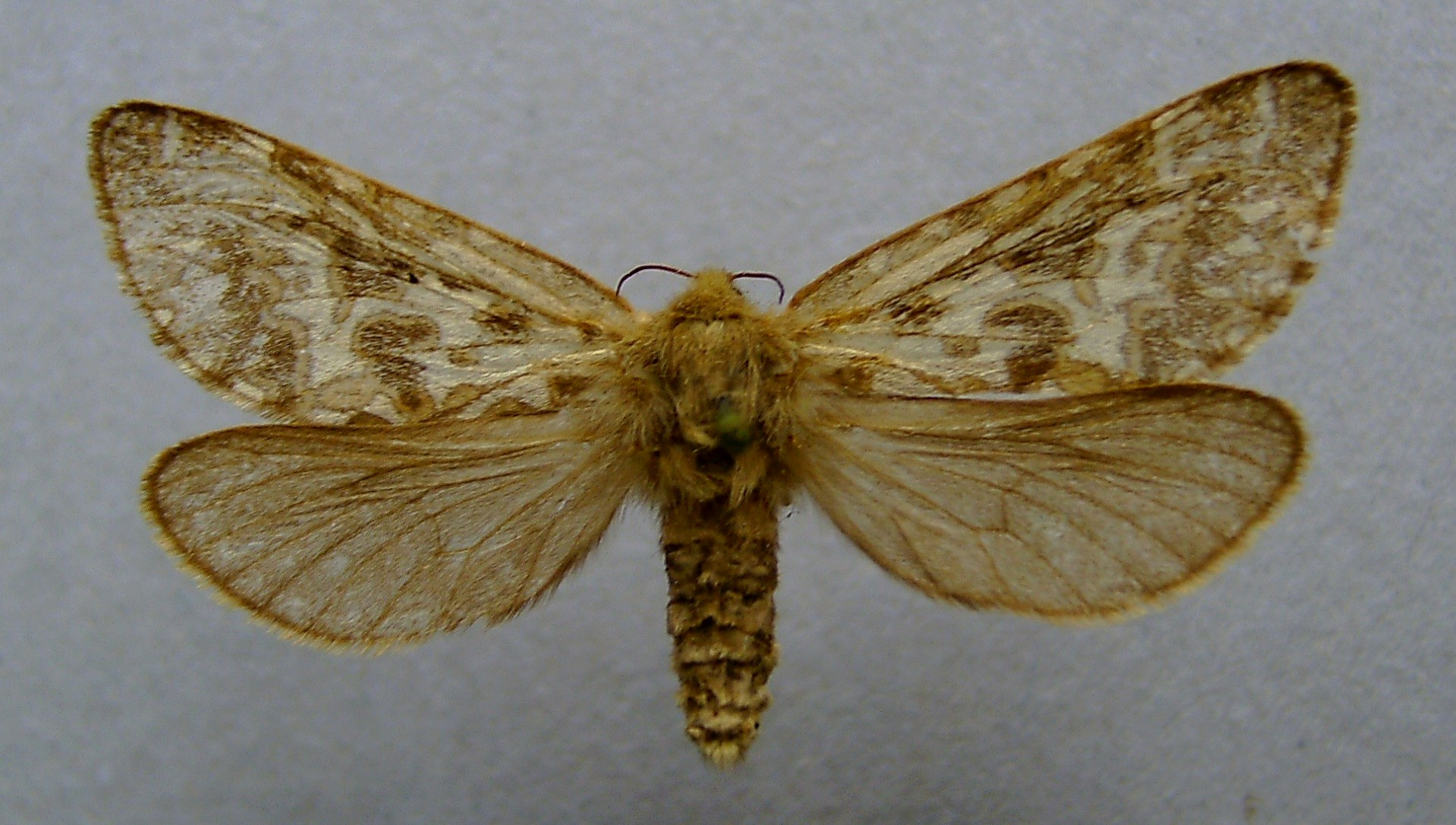
- Pharmacis carna

Scientific classification
- Domain: Eukaryota
- Kingdom: Animalia
- Phylum: Arthropoda
- Class: Insecta
- Order: Lepidoptera
- Family: Hepialidae
- Genus: Pharmacis; Hübner, 1820

Species
- See text

= Pharmacis =

Genus of moths

Pharmacis is a genus of moths of the family Hepialidae. There are eight described species found in Eurasia.

== Species ==
- Pharmacis aemilianus - Italy
- Pharmacis anselminae - Italy
- Pharmacis bertrandi - France
- Pharmacis carna - Central and eastern Europe
- Pharmacis castillanus - Spain
- Pharmacis claudiae - Italy
- Pharmacis fusconebulosa (map-winged swift) - Eurasia

- Recorded food plants: Polystichum, Pteridium, Solanum

- Pharmacis pyrenaicus - France
