= Pharmacis bertrandi =

Scientific classification
- Domain: Eukaryota
- Kingdom: Animalia
- Phylum: Arthropoda
- Class: Insecta
- Order: Lepidoptera
- Family: Hepialidae
- Genus: Pharmacis
- Species: P. bertrandi

Binomial name
- Pharmacis bertrandi (Le Cerf, 1936)

Synonyms
- Hepialus bertrandi Le Cerf, 1936

Species of moth

Pharmacis bertrandi is a moth of the family Hepialidae. It is known from France and Italy.
