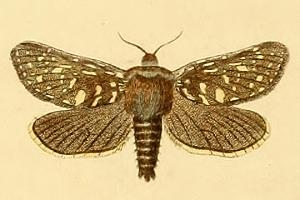
- Male
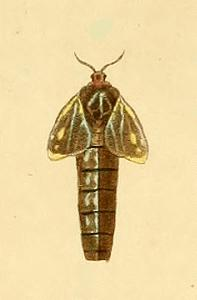
- Female

Scientific classification
- Kingdom: Animalia
- Phylum: Arthropoda
- Class: Insecta
- Order: Lepidoptera
- Family: Hepialidae
- Genus: Pharmacis
- Species: P. pyrenaicus

Binomial name
- Pharmacis pyrenaicus (Donzel, 1838)

Synonyms
- Hepialus pyrenaicus Donzel, 1838; Hepialus pyrenaeus Herrich-Schaffer, [1846]; Hepialus alticola Oberthur, 1881

= Pharmacis pyrenaicus =

Species of moth

Pharmacis pyrenaicus is a moth of the family Hepialidae. It is known from France and Spain.
