= Pharmacis anselminae =

Scientific classification
- Kingdom: Animalia
- Phylum: Arthropoda
- Clade: Pancrustacea
- Class: Insecta
- Order: Lepidoptera
- Family: Hepialidae
- Genus: Pharmacis
- Species: P. anselminae

Binomial name
- Pharmacis anselminae (Teobaldelli, 1977)

Synonyms
- Hepialus anselminae Teobaldelli, 1977

Species of moth

Pharmacis anselminae is a moth of the family Hepialidae. It is known from Italy.
