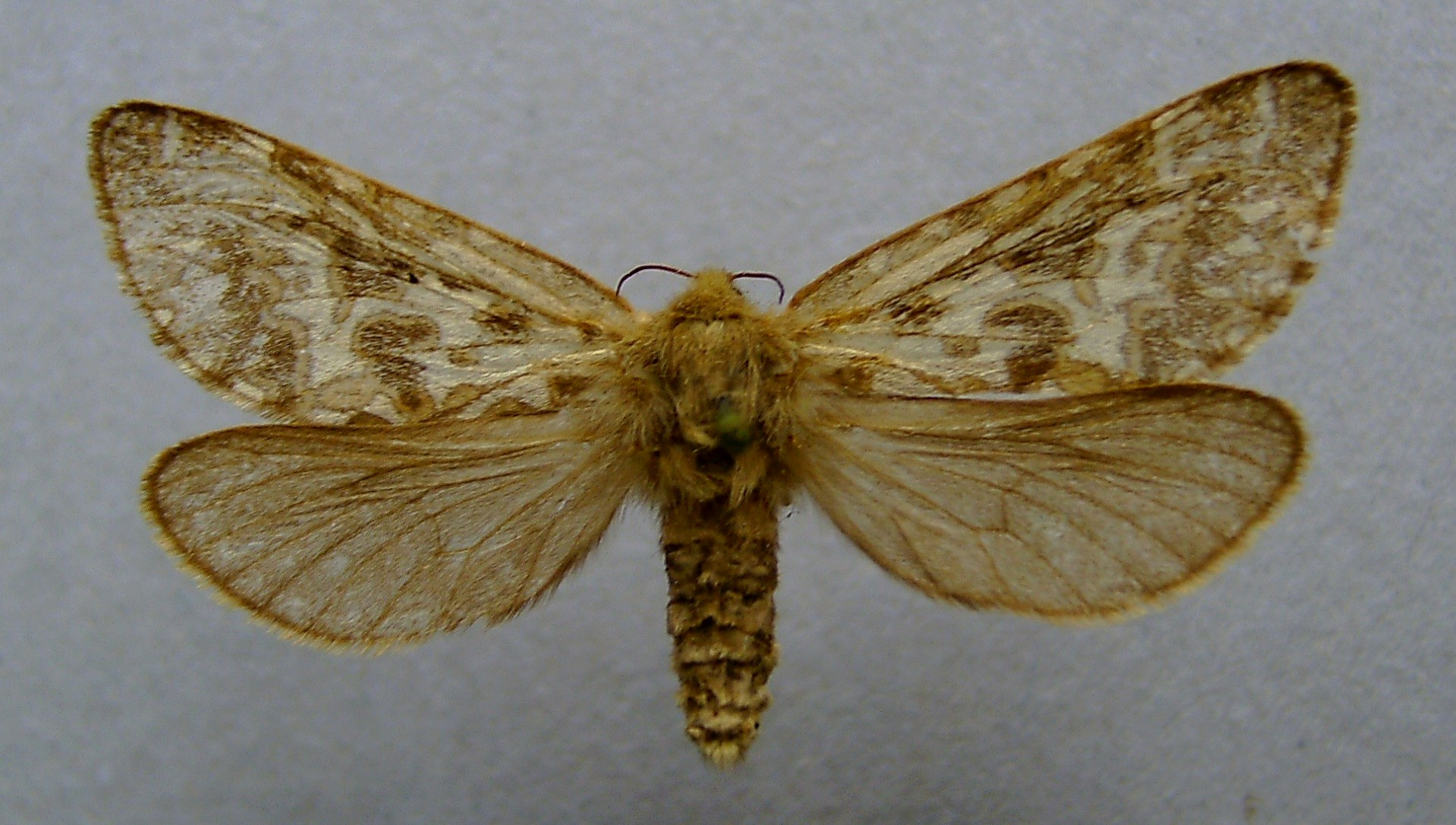

Scientific classification
- Kingdom: Animalia
- Phylum: Arthropoda
- Clade: Pancrustacea
- Class: Insecta
- Order: Lepidoptera
- Family: Hepialidae
- Genus: Pharmacis
- Species: P. carna

Binomial name
- Pharmacis carna (Denis & Schiffermüller, 1775)

Synonyms
- Bombyx carna Denis & Schiffermuller, 1775; Bombyx jodutta [Denis and Schiffermuller], 1775; Hepialus joduttator Haworth, 1802; Hepialus carnator Haworth, 1802; Hepiolus socordis Freyer, 1850; Hepiolus uredo Freyer, 1850; Hepialus uralensis Grum-Grshimailo, 1899; Hepialus transsylvanica Daniel, 1949

= Pharmacis carna =

Species of moth

Pharmacis carna is a moth of the family Hepialidae. It is mainly found in mountainous areas, mostly in the Alps and the Carpathian Mountains, although it is also present in Hungary.

The wingspan is 32–44 mm for females and 25–34 mm for males. Adults are on wing from June to August in one generation.

The larvae feed on the roots of various grass species.
