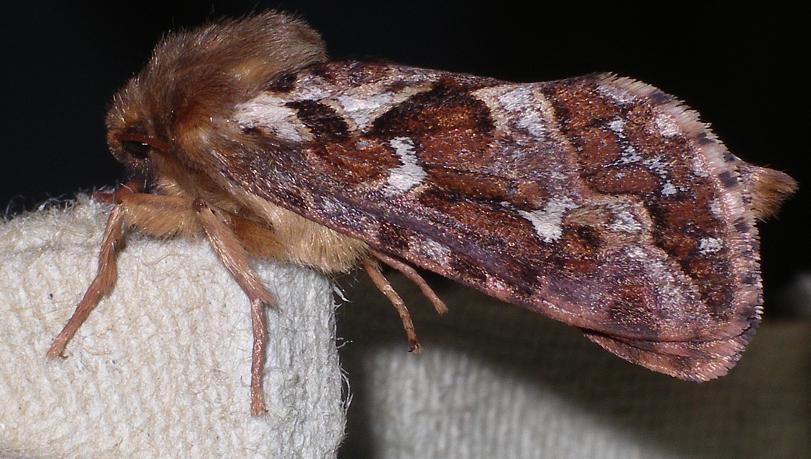

Scientific classification
- Kingdom: Animalia
- Phylum: Arthropoda
- Class: Insecta
- Order: Lepidoptera
- Family: Hepialidae
- Genus: Pharmacis
- Species: P. fusconebulosa

Binomial name
- Pharmacis fusconebulosa (De Geer, 1778)

Synonyms
- List: Phalaena fusconebulosa; De Geer, 1778; Hepialus fusconebulosus; (De Geer, 1778); Hepialus fusconebulosa; (De Geer, 1778); Phalaena mappa; Donovan, 1801; Hepialus nebulosator; Haworth, 1802; Bombyx velleda; Hubner, [1808]; Hepialus nebolosus; Haworth, 1809; Hepialusnebulosus; Haworth, 1828; Hepialus gallicus; Lederer, 1852; Hepialus askoldensis; Staudinger, 1887; Hepialus minor; Staudinger, 1887; Hepialus hyperboreus; Valle, 1931; Hepialus vallei; Gronblom, 1936; Hepialusokninskyi; Ermolajev, 1937; Hepialus latefasciatus; Bytinski-Salz, 1939; Hepialus ornatus; Bytinski-Salz, 1939; Korscheltellus centralis; Viette, 1959; Korscheltellus pyreneensis; Viette, 1959; Korscheltellus shetlandicus; Viette, 1959; Korscheltellus vosgesiacus; Viette, 1959; Korscheltellus fusconebulosa; (De Geer, 1778)

= Map-winged swift =

Species of moth

The map-winged swift (Pharmacis fusconebulosa) is a moth belonging to the family Hepialidae and has a patchy distribution throughout Eurasia. The species was first described by Charles De Geer in 1778. It was previously placed in the genus Hepialus and some references still place it there.

== Description ==
This moth gets its common name from the variegated pattern of the forewing, in various shades of black, brown and white, which look rather like a map (although there are plainer forms). Unlike most hepialids, the pattern is rather similar in both sexes although the female is usually rather larger with a wingspan of up to 50 mm.

The adult flies from May to July (August in the north of the range) and is attracted to light, sometimes strongly so. This species overwinters twice as a larva. This moth is strongly associated with bracken (Pteridium spp.) and it is most frequently encountered in habitats where this plant occurs (e.g. moorland, heathland, open woodland). However the larva, which is a root-feeder, has been recorded on other ferns such as Polystichum, grasses such as red fescue and also on potatoes and probably will feed on a wide range of other plants.

=== Larvae ===
Eggs are randomly scattered by the flying female, amongst the foodplant. The larvae have a yellowish-white body with a reddish- or purplish-brown head; thoracic plates are orange as is the body warts which have a short bristle and the spiracles are black. They are subterranean, feeding on the roots and lower stem of the foodplant, and take two years before they pupate. When fully fed they are 30–35 mm long.

== Etymology ==
The species was first described by the Swedish industrialist and entomologist, Charles De Geer in 1778, from the type specimen found in Houblon, France. Previously placed in the genus Hepialus – from the Greek; hēpialos – meaning a fever, as in 'the fitful, alternating flight' of the moth. It has since been allocated to the genus Pharmacis. The specific name fusconebulosa – is from fuscus meaning dark and nebulosus – cloudy, referring to the dark markings on the forewing of certain forms of the moth. A subspecies shetlanicus, refers to the Shetland Islands where the subspecies is found.

== Gallery ==
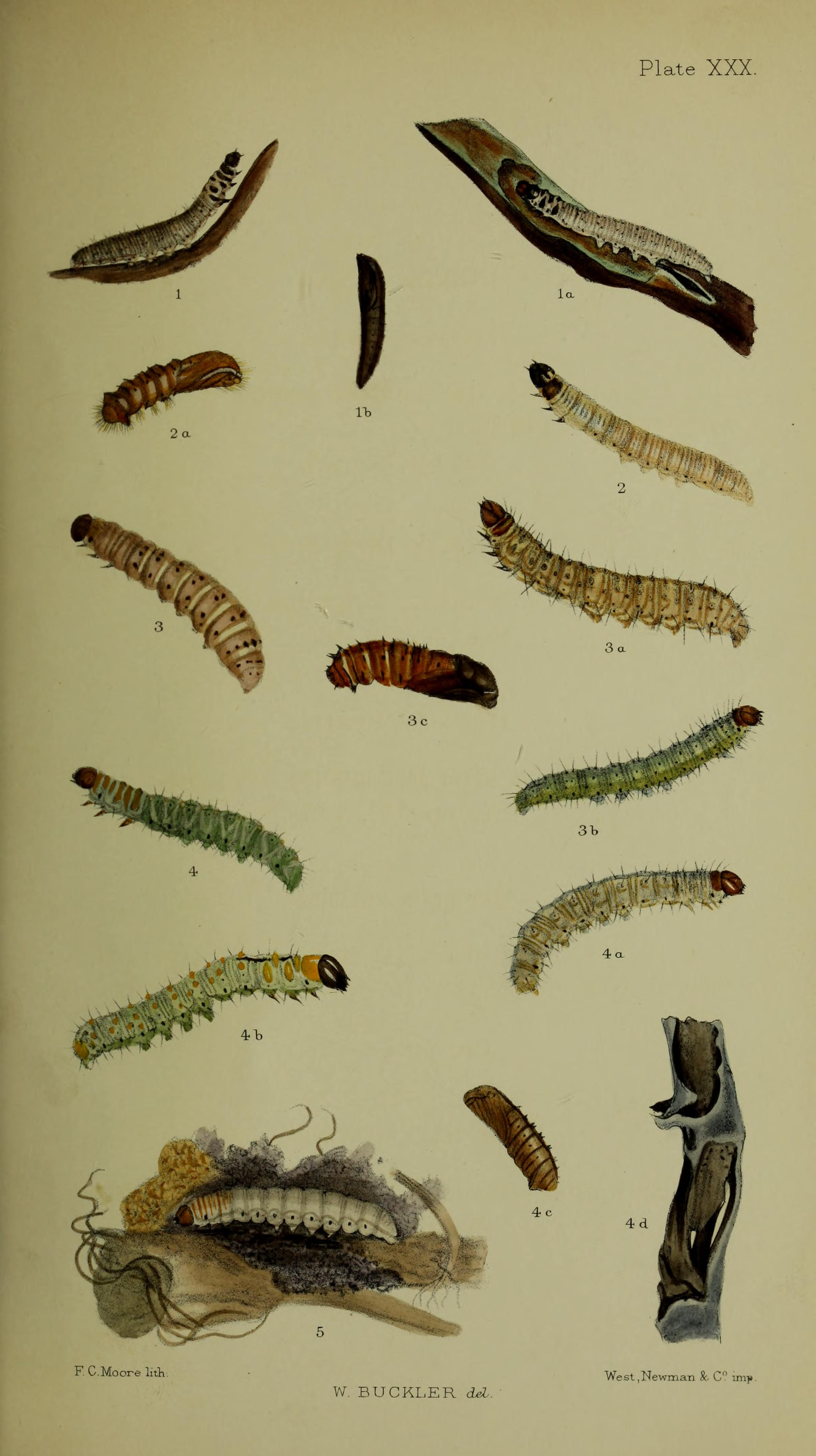
Figs. 4 4a, 4b larvae after last moult, 4c pupa 4d piece of root of fern (Pteris aquilina) burrowed by the larva

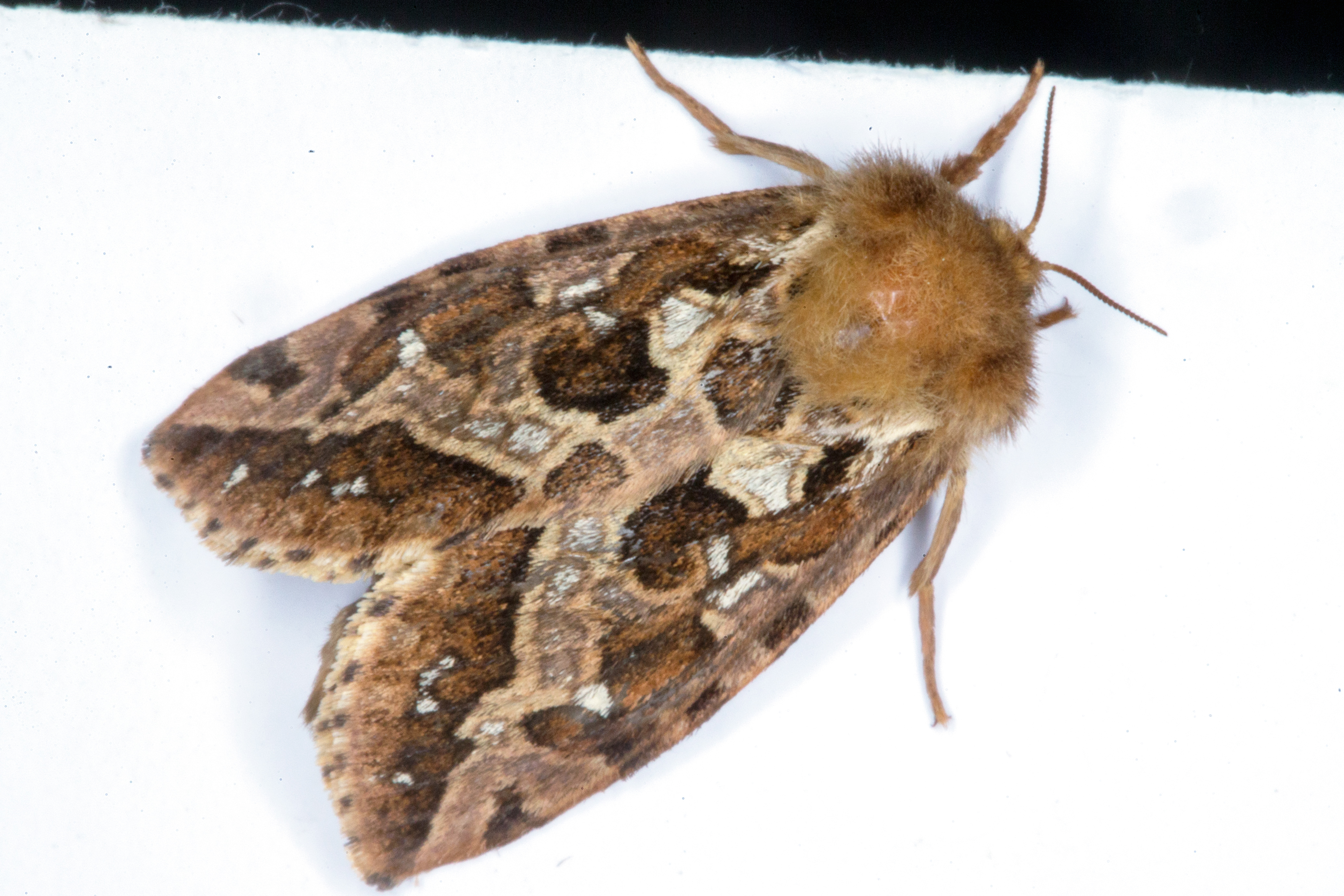

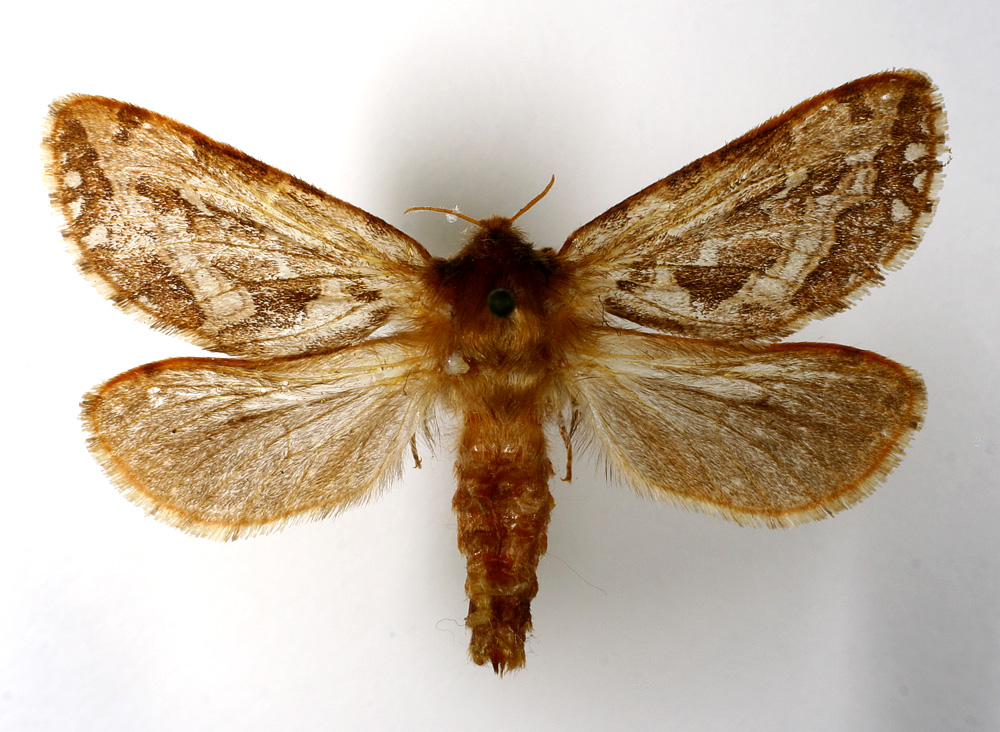
Mounted

== Notes ==
1. The "flight season" refers to the British Isles. This may vary in other parts of the range.
