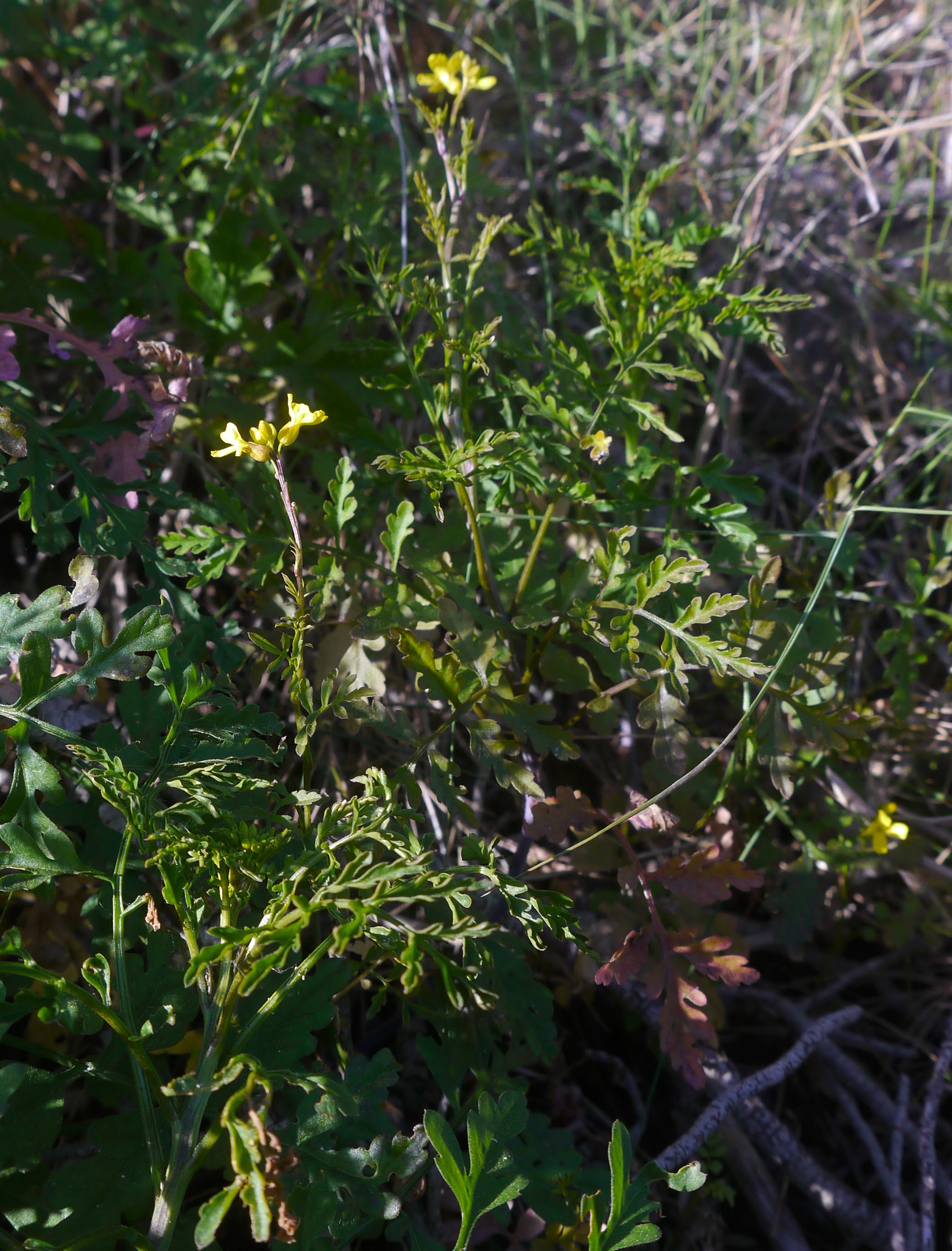

Scientific classification
- Kingdom: Plantae
- Clade: Tracheophytes
- Clade: Angiosperms
- Clade: Eudicots
- Clade: Rosids
- Order: Brassicales
- Family: Brassicaceae
- Genus: Succowia; Medik.
- Species: S. balearica

Binomial name
- Succowia balearica (L.) Medik.

Synonyms
- Biscutella balearia L'Hér. ex DC.; Bunias balearica L.; Myagrum balearicum (L.) Lam.; Succowia echinata Moench

= Succowia =

Species of flowering plant

Succowia is a monotypic genus of flowering plants belonging to the family Brassicaceae. It only contains one known species, Succowia balearica. Its native range is the Canary Islands and places around the Mediterranean Sea, such as Algeria, the Baleares, Corsica, Italy, Morocco, Sardinia, Sicily, Spain, and Tunisia.

The genus name of Succowia is in honour of Georg Adolf Suckow (1751–1813), a German physicist, chemist, mineralogist, mining engineer and naturalist. The Latin specific epithet of balearica means "of the Balearic Islands", where the plant was found. Both the genus and the species were first described and published in Pflanzen-Gattungen on page 64 in 1792.
