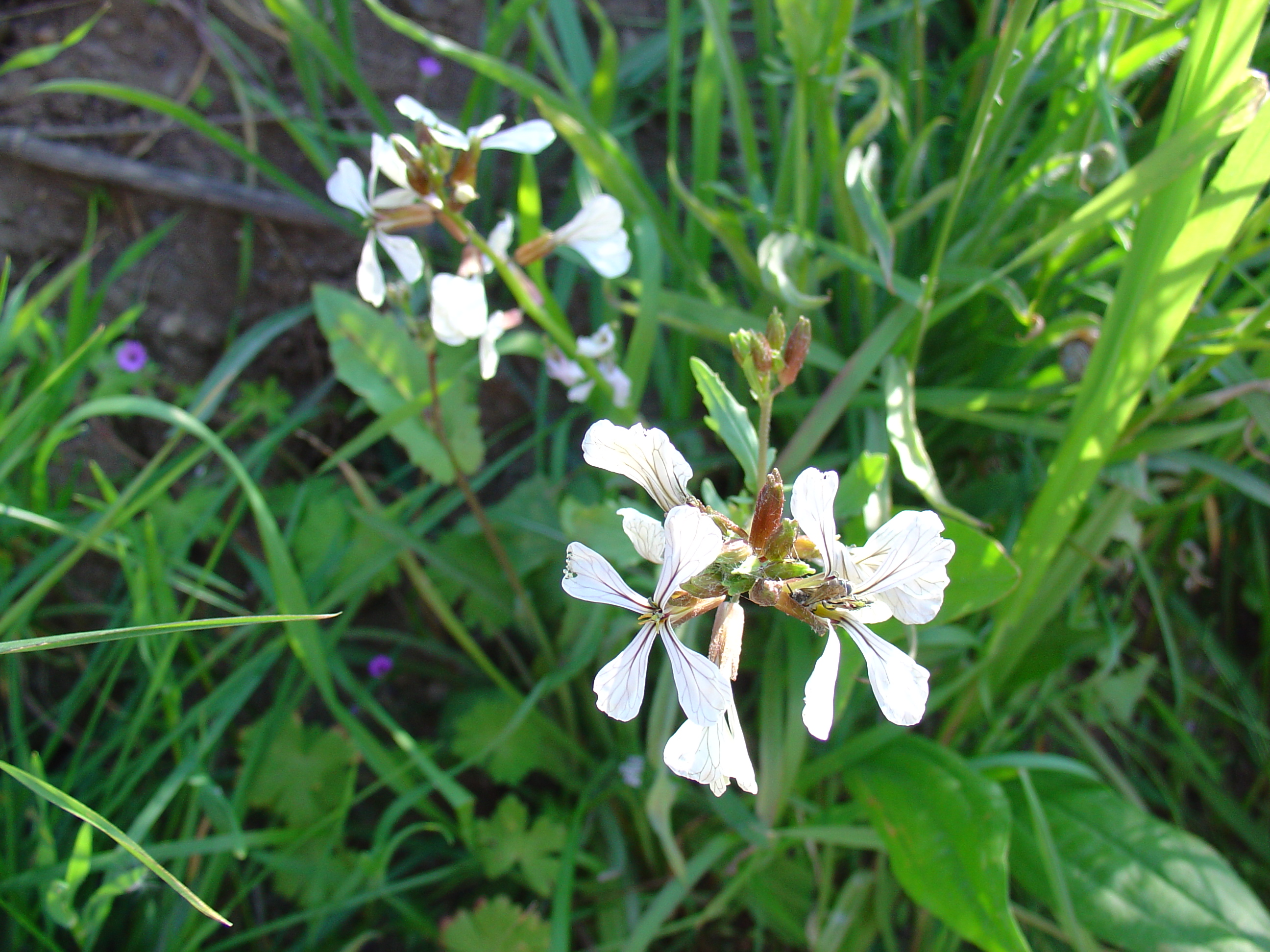
- Eruca vesicaria

Scientific classification
- Kingdom: Plantae
- Clade: Tracheophytes
- Clade: Angiosperms
- Clade: Eudicots
- Clade: Rosids
- Order: Brassicales
- Family: Brassicaceae
- Genus: Eruca; Mill.

Species
- See text

Synonyms
- Euzomum Link; Velleruca Pomel

= Eruca =

Genus of flowering plants

Eruca is a genus of flowering plants in the family Brassicaceae, native to the Mediterranean region, western and Central Asia, and China. It includes the leaf vegetable known as rocket or arugula.

== Description ==
The species can be either annual or biennial, growing to 20–100 cm tall. The leaves are deeply pinnately lobed with four to ten small lateral lobes and a large terminal lobe. The flowers are 2–4 cm diameter, arranged in a corymb, with the typical 4-petal, 4-sepal Brassicaceae flower structure; the petals are creamy white with purple veins, and the stamens yellow. The fruit is a siliqua (pod) 12–25 mm long with an apical beak, and containing several seeds.

== Species ==
The number of species is disputed, with some authorities only accepting a single species, while others accept up to six species. Plants of the World Online accepts six species:

- Eruca aurea Batt.
- Eruca foleyi (Batt.) Lorite, Perfectti, J.M.Gómez, Gonz.-Megías & Abdelaziz
- Eruca longirostris Uechtr.
- Eruca pinnatifida (Desf.) Pomel (syn. E. sativa subsp. pinnatifida (Desf.) Batt.; E. vesicaria subsp. pinnatifida (Desf.) Emberger & Maire)
- Eruca sativa Mill. (syn. E. vesicaria subsp. sativa (Mill.) Thell.)
- Eruca vesicaria (L.) Cav.

When treated as a monospecific genus, all are included within E. vesicaria.
