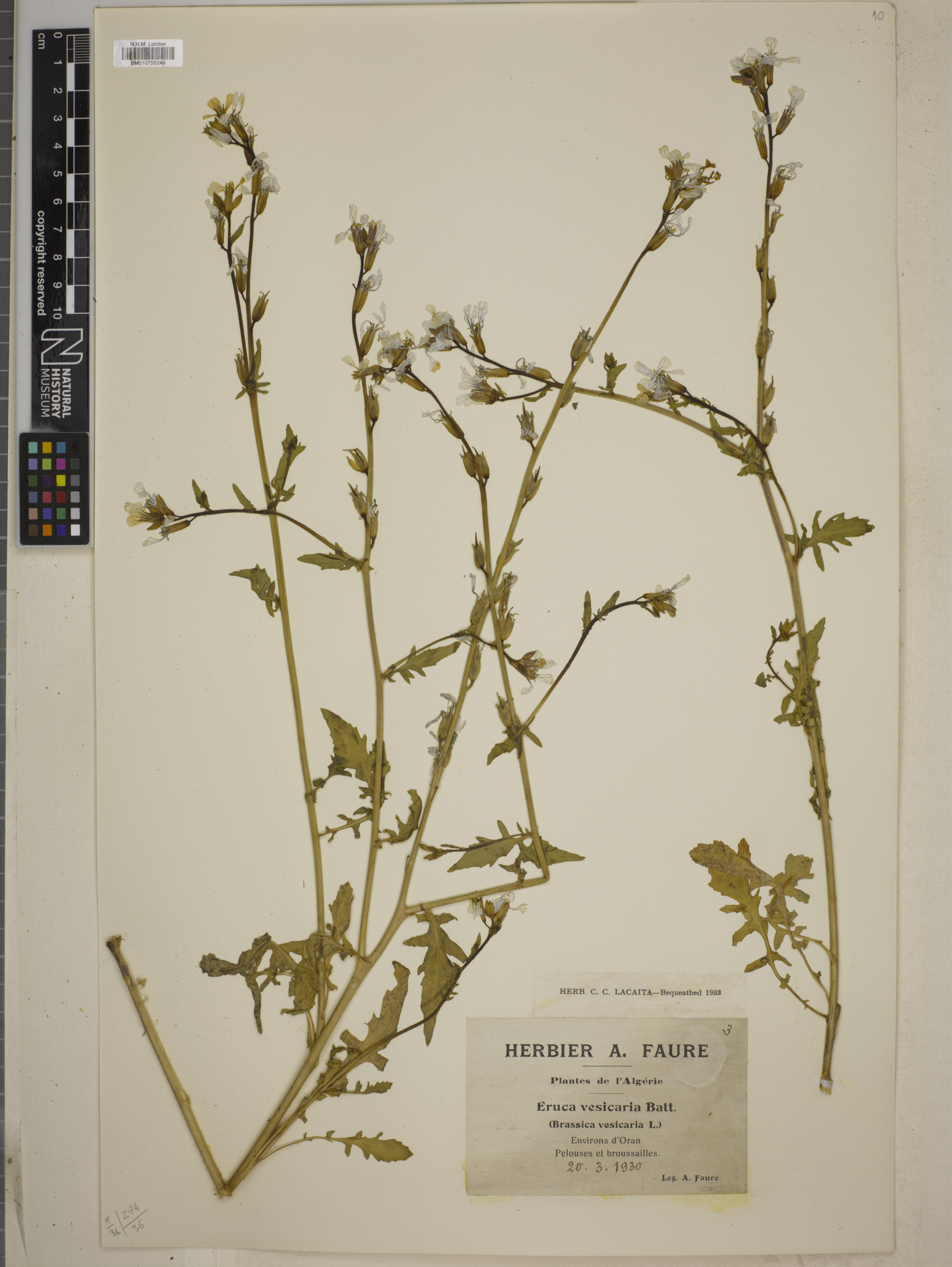

Scientific classification
- Kingdom: Plantae
- Clade: Tracheophytes
- Clade: Angiosperms
- Clade: Eudicots
- Clade: Rosids
- Order: Brassicales
- Family: Brassicaceae
- Genus: Eruca
- Species: E. vesicaria

Binomial name
- Eruca vesicaria (L.) Cav.

Synonyms
- Brassica vesicaria L.; Eruca sativa subsp. vesicaria (L.) Jahand. & Maire; Eruca sativa var. vesicaria (L.) Coss.; Euzomum vesicarium (L.) Link; Raphanus vesicarius (L.) Crantz; Velleruca vesicaria (L.) Pomel

= Eruca vesicaria =

Species of plant

Eruca vesicaria is a species of Eruca native to Spain, Morocco, and Algeria. Some botanists consider Eruca vesicaria and E. sativa (arugula) to be conspecific. However, they are different in many morphological aspects such as sepal persistence, silique shape, and habit. Most importantly, they do not hybridize freely with each other as there is partial reproductive isolation between them. Plants of the World Online has accepted them as two distinct species.
