= Hugues-Fleury Donzel =

French entomologist

Hugues-Fleury Donzel (14 February 1791, Rive-de-Gier, Loire – 18 November 1850, Lyon) was a French entomologist specialising in butterflies and moths.

He described Euchloe charlonia, Cigaritis zohra (1847), Pharmacis pyrenaicus and many other species. Donzel was a Member of the Société entomologique de France.

== Contributions to taxonomy ==
Donzel established the butterfly genus Cigaritis in 1847. The genus belongs to the family Lycaenidae and remains in use in modern taxonomic research. A 2024 study published in Zootaxa described a new species of Cigaritis from the Western Ghats of India, retaining Donzel's authorship of the genus.

== Works ==
- Donzel, Hugues (1837): Observations sur l'accouplement de quelques genres de Lépidoptères diurnes, et sur le genre Piéride. Annales de la Société Entomologique de France [1]6, pp. [77-81]
- Donzel, Hugues (1842): Description de deux Lépidoptères nouveaux recueillis en Barbarie par le Capitaine Charlon. Annales de la Société Entomologique de France [1]11, pp. [197-199, pl 8, 2 f] online
- Donzel, Hugues (1847): Description de Lépidoptères nouveaux. Annales de la Société Entomologique de France (2)5, pp. [525-530]

== Bibliography ==
- Jean-Jacques Amigo, « Donzel (Hugues-Fleury) », in Nouveau Dictionnaire de biographies roussillonnaises, vol. 3 Sciences de la Vie et de la Terre, Perpignan, Publications de l'olivier, 2017, 915 p. (ISBN 9782908866506)
- Groll, E. K. (Hrsg.): Biografien der Entomologen der Welt : Datenbank. Version 4.15 : Senckenberg Deutsches Entomologisches Institut, 2010
- Walther Horn & Sigmund Schenkling: Index Litteraturae Entomologicae. Serie I: Die Welt-Literatur über die gesamte Entomologie bis inklusive 1863. Berlin 1928.
