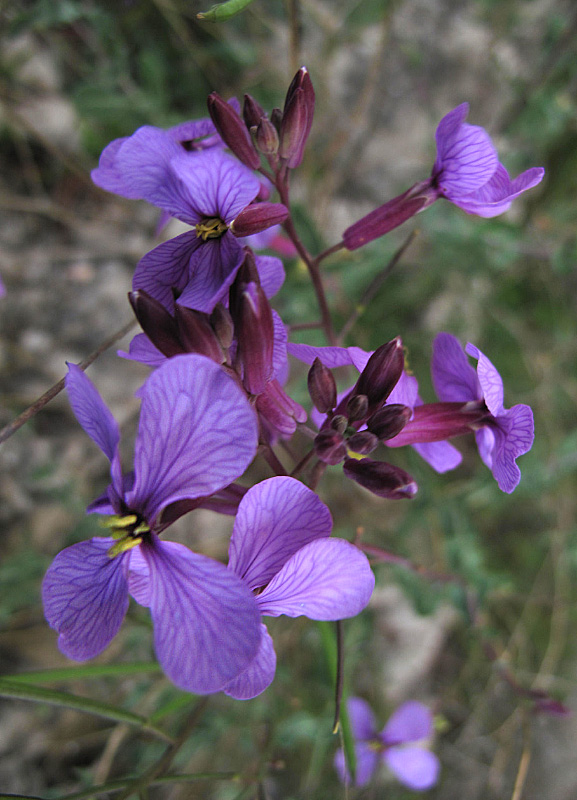
- Inflorescence
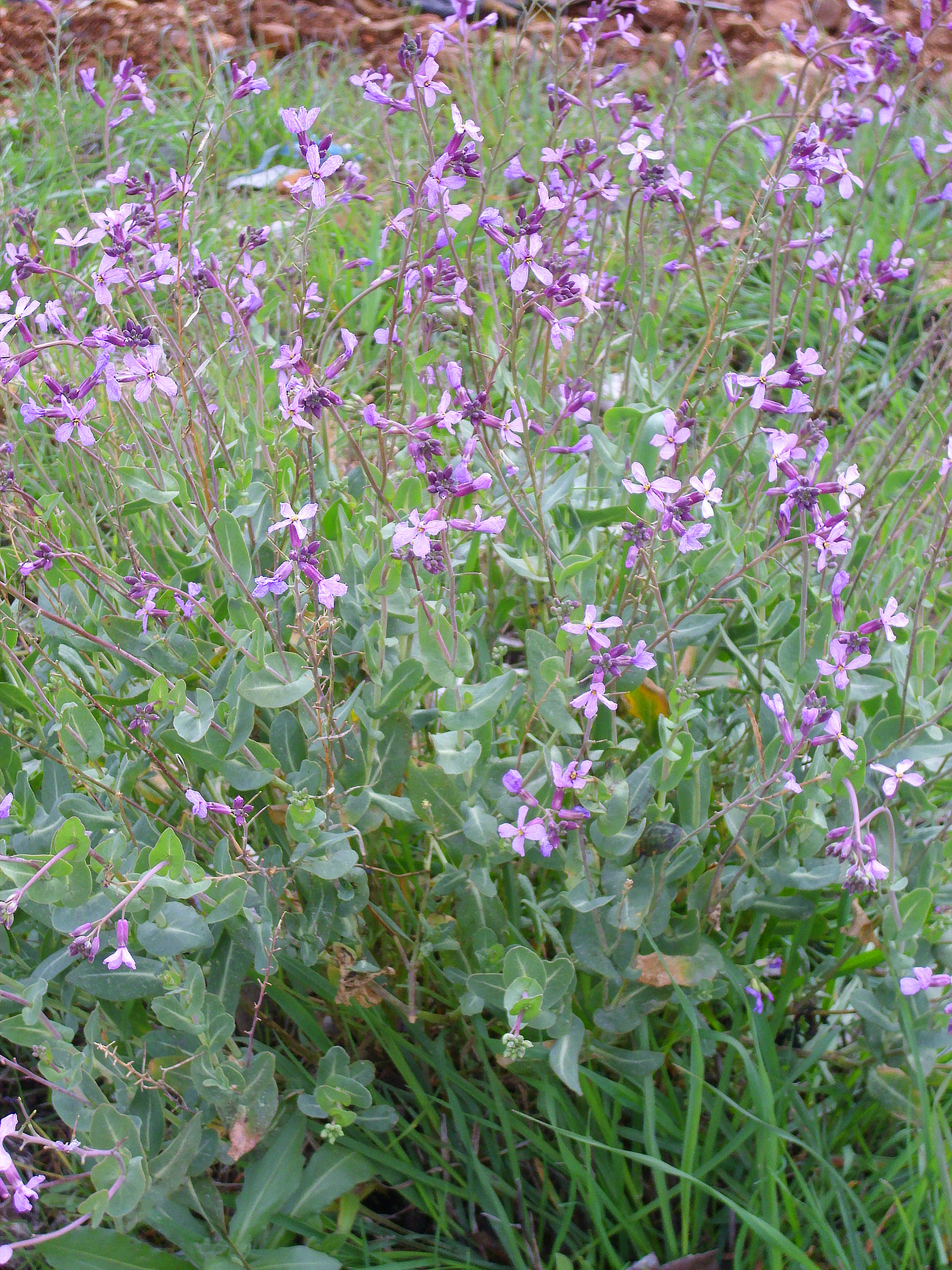
- Habitus

Scientific classification
- Kingdom: Plantae
- Clade: Tracheophytes
- Clade: Angiosperms
- Clade: Eudicots
- Clade: Rosids
- Order: Brassicales
- Family: Brassicaceae
- Genus: Moricandia
- Species: M. arvensis

Binomial name
- Moricandia arvensis (L.) DC.

Synonyms
- List: Agrosinapis arvensis (L.) Fourr.; Brassica arvensis L.; Brassica moricandia Boiss.; Brassica purpurea Mill.; Diplotaxis arvensis (L.) Bluff, Nees & Schauer; Diplotaxis brassiciformis Koch ex Boiss.; Eruca arvensis (L.) Noulet; Erucastrum decandollii K.F.Schimp. & Spenn.; Hesperis arvensis (L.) Cav.; Moricandia longirostris Pomel; Sisymbrium amplexicaule Jan ex E.Fourn.

= Moricandia arvensis =

Species of plant in the mustard family

Moricandia arvensis, the purple mistress, is a species of flowering plant in the family Brassicaceae. It has a broadly western Mediterranean distribution, from the Canary Islands to northern Africa including Mauritania and Chad, the Iberian Peninsula, Italy and as far as Greece, and has been introduced to France, Corsica, and Sardinia. It has an intermediate C_{3}–C_{4} carbon fixation system, known as C_{2} photosynthesis.
