= Pieris marginalis reicheli =

Scientific classification
- Kingdom: Animalia
- Phylum: Arthropoda
- Class: Insecta
- Order: Lepidoptera
- Family: Pieridae
- Genus: Pieris
- Species: P. marginalis
- Subspecies: P. m. reicheli

Trinomial name
- Pieris marginalis reicheli Eitschberger, 1983

Subspecies of butterfly

Pieris marginalis reicheli is one of the many subspecies of Pieris marginalis, a species of Pierid butterfly. Its range is mainly confined to British Columbia, Canada.
