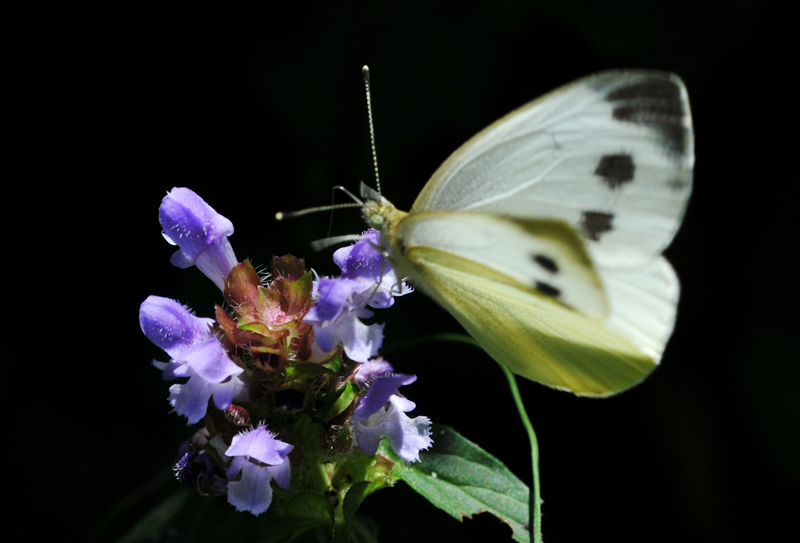
- Pieris pseudorapae, Espiye

Scientific classification
- Kingdom: Animalia
- Phylum: Arthropoda
- Clade: Pancrustacea
- Class: Insecta
- Order: Lepidoptera
- Family: Pieridae
- Tribe: Pierini
- Genus: Pieris; Schrank, 1801

Species
- Almost 40, see text

Synonyms
- Mancipium Hübner, [1806]; Danaus Oken, 1815; Ganoris Dalman, 1816; Andropodum Hübner, 1822; Tachyptera Berge, 1842; Artogeia Verity, 1947; Talbotia Bernardi, 1958

= Pieris (butterfly) =

Butterfly genus in family Pieridae

Pieris, the whites or garden whites, is a widespread, now almost cosmopolitan, genus of butterflies of the family Pieridae. The highest species diversity is in the Palearctic, with a higher diversity in Europe and eastern North America than the similar and closely related Pontia. The females of many Pieris butterflies are UV reflecting, while the male wings are strongly UV absorbing due to pigments in the scales.

== Ecology ==
Many species of this genus have caterpillars which feed on cabbage and other members of the Brassicaceae. The chemical basis of this association with a certain plant group has been studied for over 100 years, and is now known to occur via a number of biochemical adaptations to chemicals called glucosinolates in these plants. In contrast to most other insects, Pieris caterpillars are able to detoxify these chemicals, and have become so specialised that they will not eat any food without glucosinolates. The Pieris females, in turn, check for the presence of glucosinolates before laying eggs on a plant. The crop-damaging species have spread from Eurasia to most of the rest of the world (most recently to South America and Africa) and are considered pest insects almost everywhere. There are species of Pieris that are not pests, such as the North American species Pieris oleracea (mustard white) and Pieris virginiensis (Virginia white). These butterflies feed successfully only on specific native vegetation.</ref>

Some members of Pieris are threatened by the rapid spread of some plants in the Brassicaceae, such as the way the highly invasive garlic mustard (Alliaria petiolata) kills the larvae of Pieris oleracea and Pieris virginiensis in North America. Given the large differences between the chemicals that garlic mustard creates versus those of mustards native to North America, it is likely that it is also lethal to other members of Pieris that are native to North America. It is listed as a suitable food plant for the Eurasian Veined white (Pieris napi). Having not evolved with garlic mustard, the aforementioned American butterflies lay eggs on it, confusing it with their host plants due to a similar odor. Just because butterflies are members of Pieris does not mean they are all capable of feeding on the same members of Brassicaceae that other members of Pieris can feed on.

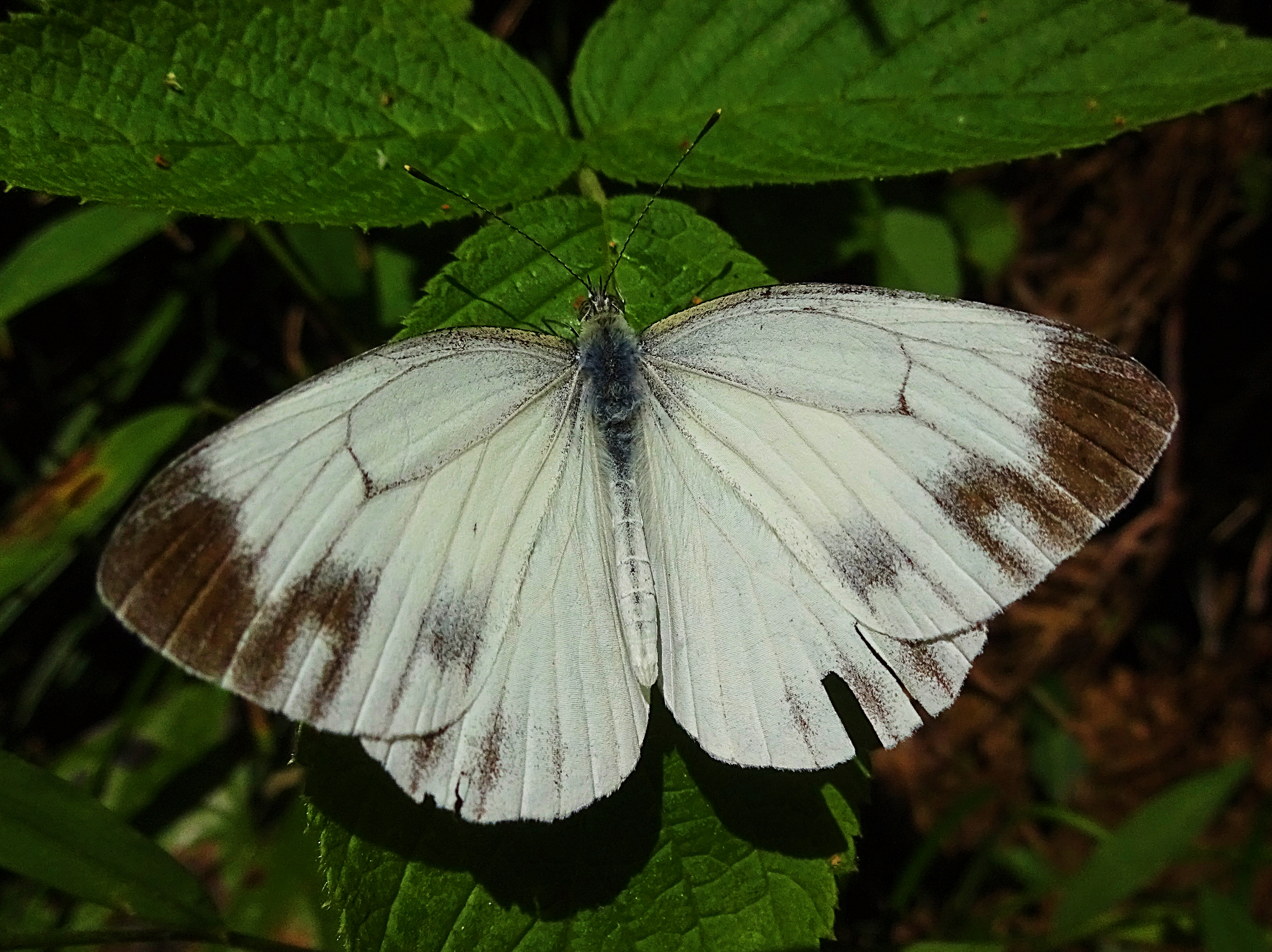
Grey-veined white (Pieris melete), Tokyo

== Species and notable subspecies ==
Arranged alphabetically:

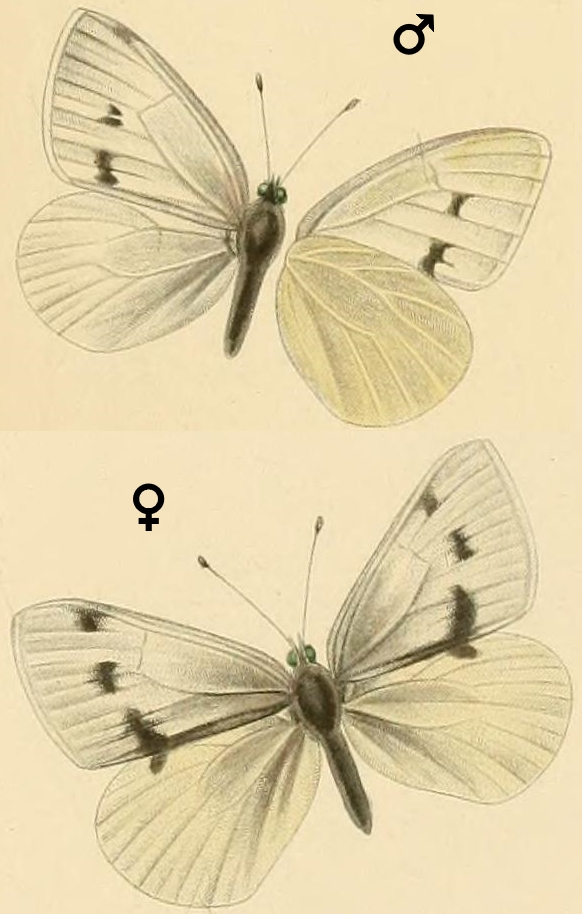
Pieris tadjika male (above) and female (below)

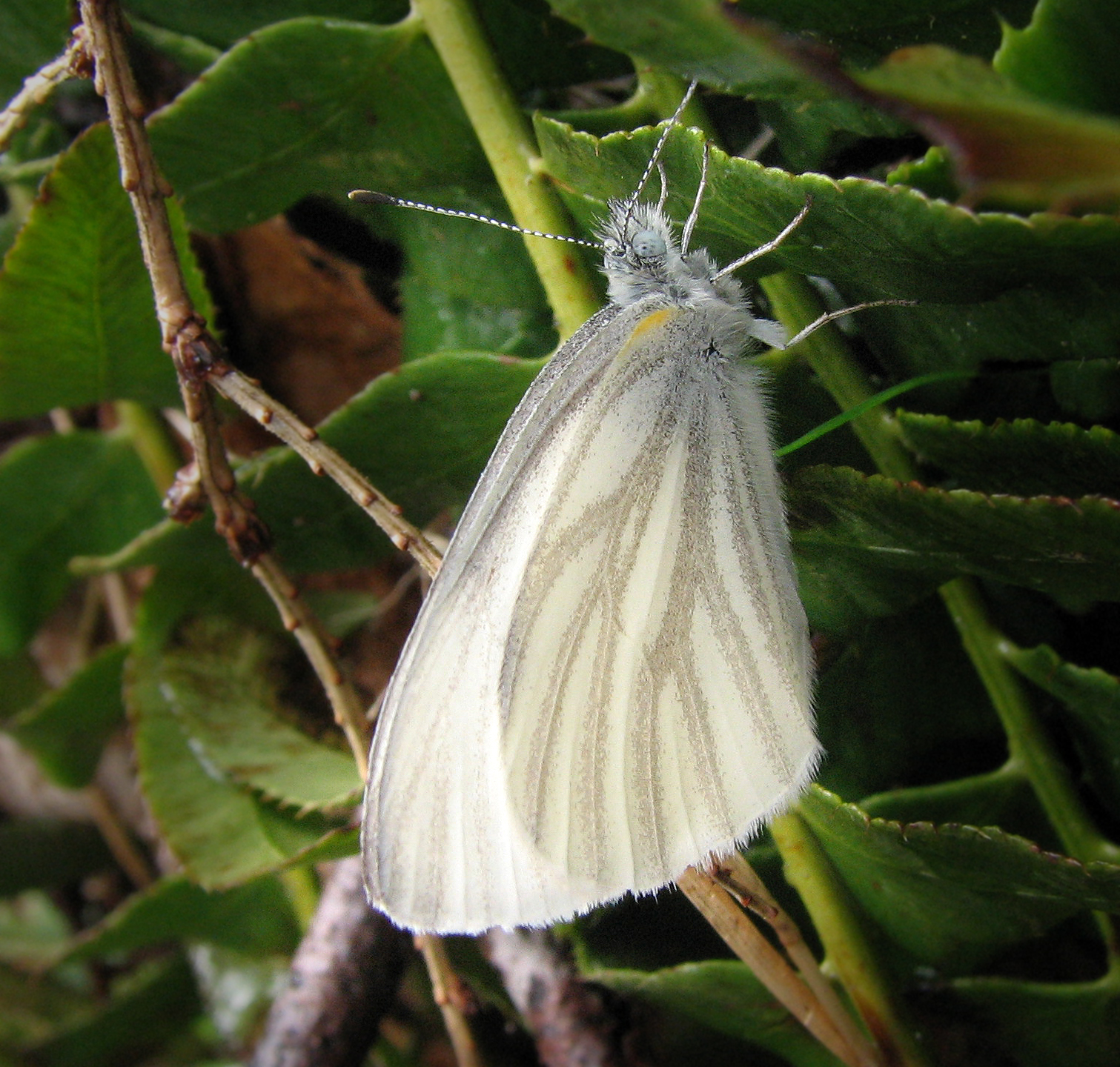
Pieris virginiensis

- Pieris ajaka Moore, 1865 (Kashmir)
- Pieris angelika Eitschberger, 1983 – Arctic white
- Pieris balcana Lorkovic, 1970 – Balkan green-veined white (southeast Europe)
- Pieris bowdeni Eitschberger, 1984 (Iran, Turkey, Transcaucasia, Kopet-Dagh)
- Pieris brassicae (Linnaeus, 1758) – large white or large cabbage white
- Pieris brassicoides Guérin-Méneville, 1849
- Pieris bryoniae (Hübner, [1790-1793]) – dark-veined white or mountain green-veined white
- Pieris canidia (Sparrman, 1768) – Indian cabbage white
- Pieris cheiranthi (Hübner, 1808) – Canary Islands' large white
- Pieris chumbiensis (de Nicéville, 1884) – Chumbi white
- Pieris davidis Oberthür, 1876 (western and central China)
- Pieris deota (de Nicéville, 1884) – Kashmir white
- Pieris dubernardi Oberthür, 1884 (western China)
- Pieris dulcinea (Butler, 1882) (northeastern Korea)
- Pieris eitschbergeri Lukhtanov, 1996 (Kirgisien, Inner Tienshan) – may be synonym of Pieris deota
- Pieris ergane (Geyer, [1828]) – mountain small white
- Pieris erutae Poujade, 1888 (eastern Tibet, Yunnan (China))
- Pieris euorientis (Verity, 1908) (Altai Mountains to central Yakutia)
- Pieris extensa Poujade, 1888 (western China, Fukien, India) – sometimes in Pontia
- Pieris krueperi Staudinger, 1860 – Krueper's small white
  - Pieris krueperi devta (de Nicéville, 1884) – green-banded white
- Pieris lama Sugiyama, 1996 (western China)
- Pieris mahometana (Grum-Grshimailo, 1888) (northeastern Afghanistan and Pamirs)
- Pieris mannii (Mayer, 1851) – southern small white
- Pieris marginalis Scudder, 1861 – margined white
  - Pieris marginalis reicheli Eitschberger, 1983 – Reichel's margined white
- Pieris meckyae Eitschberger, 1983 – Mecky's white (Alaska) may be subspecies of Pieris marginalis
- Pieris melete Ménétriés, 1857 – grey-veined white (northern India, and separately in China, Korea and Japan)
- Pieris naganum Moore, 1884 – Naga white
- Pieris napi (Linnaeus, 1758) – green-veined white or veined white
- Pieris narina (Verity, 1908) (Tian-Shan)
- Pieris nesis Fruhstorfer, 1909 (Japan)
- Pieris ochsenheimeri (Staudinger, 1886) (mountains of central Asia)
- Pieris oleracea Harris, 1829 – mustard white
  - Pieris oleracea frigida Scudder, 1861 – Newfoundland white
- Pieris persis (Verity, 1922) (Iran)
- Pieris pseudorapae (Verity, [1908]) (southern Europe, Turkey and Iran)
- Pieris rapae (Linnaeus, 1758) – small white or (small) cabbage white
- Pieris shangrilla Tadokoro, Shinkawa & Wang, 2013
- Pieris steinigeri Eitschberger, 1984 (Weihsi (China))
- Pieris tadjika Grum-Grshimailo, 1888 (Iraq)
- Pieris virginiensis (W.H. Edwards, 1870) – West Virginia white
