= Pieris oleracea frigida =

Newfoundland white

Scientific classification
- Kingdom: Animalia
- Phylum: Arthropoda
- Class: Insecta
- Order: Lepidoptera
- Family: Pieridae
- Genus: Pieris
- Species: P. oleracea
- Subspecies: P. o. frigida

Trinomial name
- Pieris oleracea frigida Scudder, 1861

Subspecies of butterfly

Pieris oleracea frigida, the Newfoundland white, is a subarctic subspecies of the mustard white butterfly. It is mostly confined to the Newfoundland area of Canada.
