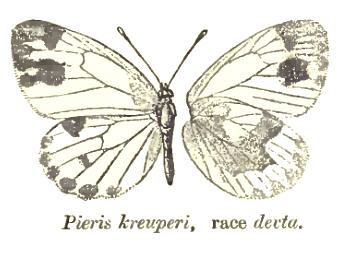

Scientific classification
- Kingdom: Animalia
- Phylum: Arthropoda
- Clade: Pancrustacea
- Class: Insecta
- Order: Lepidoptera
- Family: Pieridae
- Genus: Pieris
- Species: P. krueperi
- Subspecies: P. k. devta

Trinomial name
- Pieris krueperi devta (de Nicéville, 1884)

Synonyms
- Mancipium devta de Nicéville, [1884]

= Pieris krueperi devta =

Green-banded white

Subspecies of butterfly

Pieris krueperi devta, the green-banded white, is a small butterfly of the family Pieridae, that is, the yellows and whites. It is found in India and Pakistan. It is a subspecies of Krueper's small white (Pieris krueperi).

== Description ==
Male upperside dead white. Forewing: a narrow band of irrorated black scales along basal portion of costa; a wedge-shaped short costal black spot before the apex; apex black; that colour continued along the anterior portion of the termen as a series of inwardly-pointed triangular coalescent spots at apices of veins 4 and 5; lastly, a large black spot in the outer half of interspace 3. Hindwing: a black costal spot just before the apex, otherwise uniform white. Underside: ground colour similar. Forewing: black markings similar to those on the upperside, but the black at apex and on termen replaced anteriorly by a dull faint wash of ochraceous or greenish yellow. Hindwing: basal two-thirds irrorated more or less thickly with black scales, with the exception of a short, very broad, inwardly oblique band of the ground colour, that extends from the middle of the costa to within the upper portion of the discoidal cell; the outer margin of the area irrorated with black scales is transverse from costa to interspace 5, thence curved outwards to vein 4 and obliquely to vein 1a. Antennae brown, paler at their apices; head fuscous; thorax and abdomen black; beneath: whitish.

Female upperside similar to that in the male, but the black markings on the forewing broader, more conspicuous and extended lower along the termen than in the male; on the hindwing the black costal spot larger, with in most specimens a well-marked spot also in interspace 3, and in many a series of detached terminal black spots at the apices of the veins. These markings are very prominent in some specimens from Quetta. Underside: as in the male. Forewing: the additional black spot in interspace 1 small, the black spot in interspace 3 very large. Hindwing: the terminal series of black spots of the upperside diffuse, more or less continuous or coalescing and washed over with a greenish tint. Antennae, thorax and abdomen as in the male.

It has a wingspan of 44–54 mm.

== Description ==
It is found in Ladakh; Baluchistan; Pishin.

== See also ==
- List of butterflies of India
- List of butterflies of India (Pieridae)
