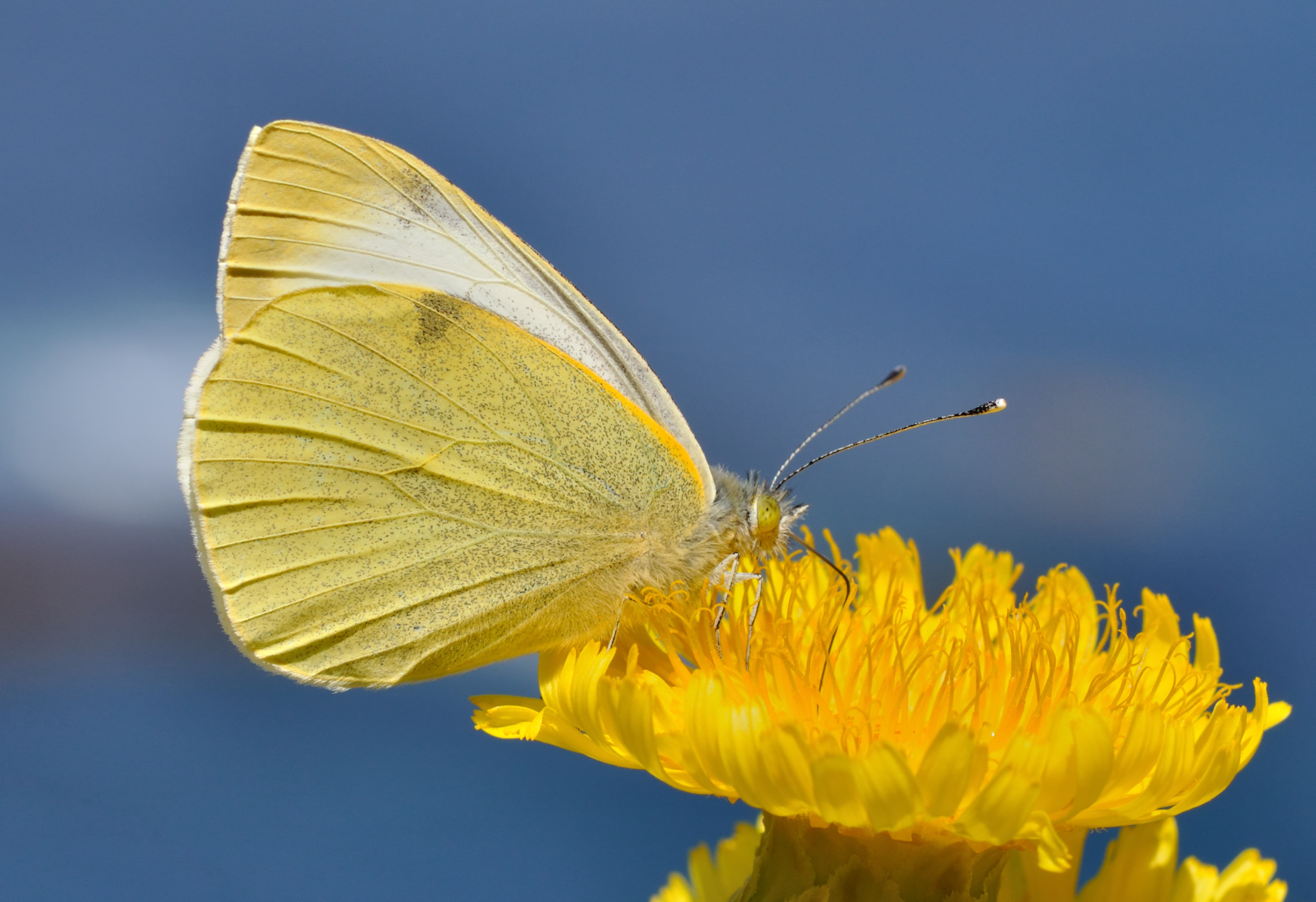

Conservation status
- Endangered (IUCN 3.1)

Scientific classification
- Kingdom: Animalia
- Phylum: Arthropoda
- Class: Insecta
- Order: Lepidoptera
- Family: Pieridae
- Genus: Pieris
- Species: P. cheiranthi

Binomial name
- Pieris cheiranthi (Hübner, 1808)

= Canary Islands large white =

Species of butterfly

The Canary Islands large white (Pieris cheiranthi) is a species of butterfly in the family Pieridae. It is endemic to the Canary Islands (Spain).

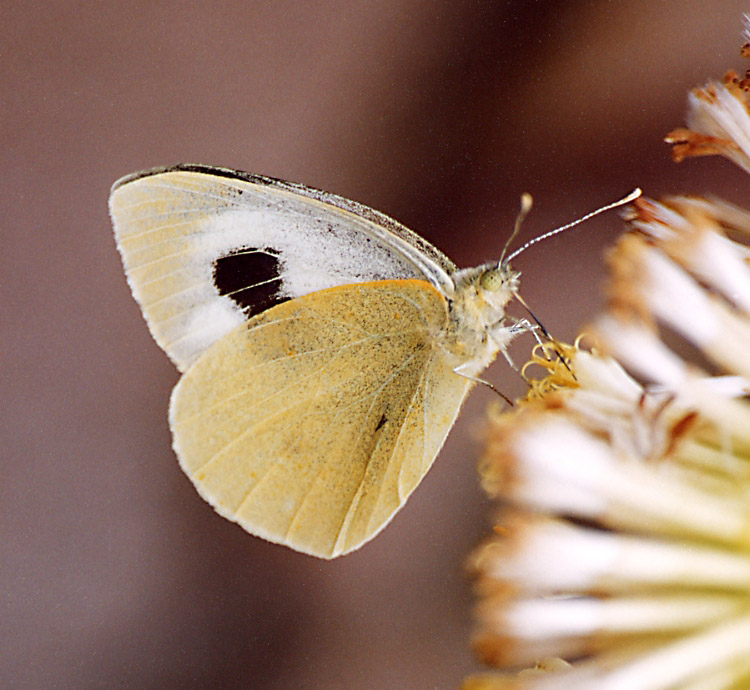
Pieris cheiranthi female showing the very large black spots characteristic of this species.

== Description ==
Very similar to Pieris brassicae, but the black discal patches are much larger and fused together. It reaches a size of 57 to 66 millimeters.

== Distribution ==
The Canary white is widespread on La Palma, in Tenerife it is limited to the northern coastal areas. The last records from La Gomera dates back to 1975 and the species is probably extinct on that island. There are also unconfirmed reports from Gran Canaria.

== Subspecies ==
- Pieris cheiranthi cheiranthi (Hübner, 1808)
- Pieris cheiranthi benchoavensis Pinker, 1969, La Palma (Canary Islands)

== Habitat ==
The Canary White inhabits wet and moist shady gorges in laurel forests . It also occurs outside the laurel forest zone, for example, wet cliffs with a corresponding microclimate.

== Biology ==
The female lays the eggs on the underside of leaves in piles of 5 to 50 . The larvae have a light green base color and are dotted black. At the top and sides they show a light yellow stripe. Among the food plants of the caterpillars are include Canary silverwort (Lobularia canariensis) and nasturtium (Tropaeolum majus). Crambe strigosa, endemic to the Canary Islands, seems to be the only natural food plant. The species flies in seven to eight consecutive generations, which partially overlap. The imago occurs throughout the year, a diapause is not known.

== Threats ==
Threatened by habitat loss.
