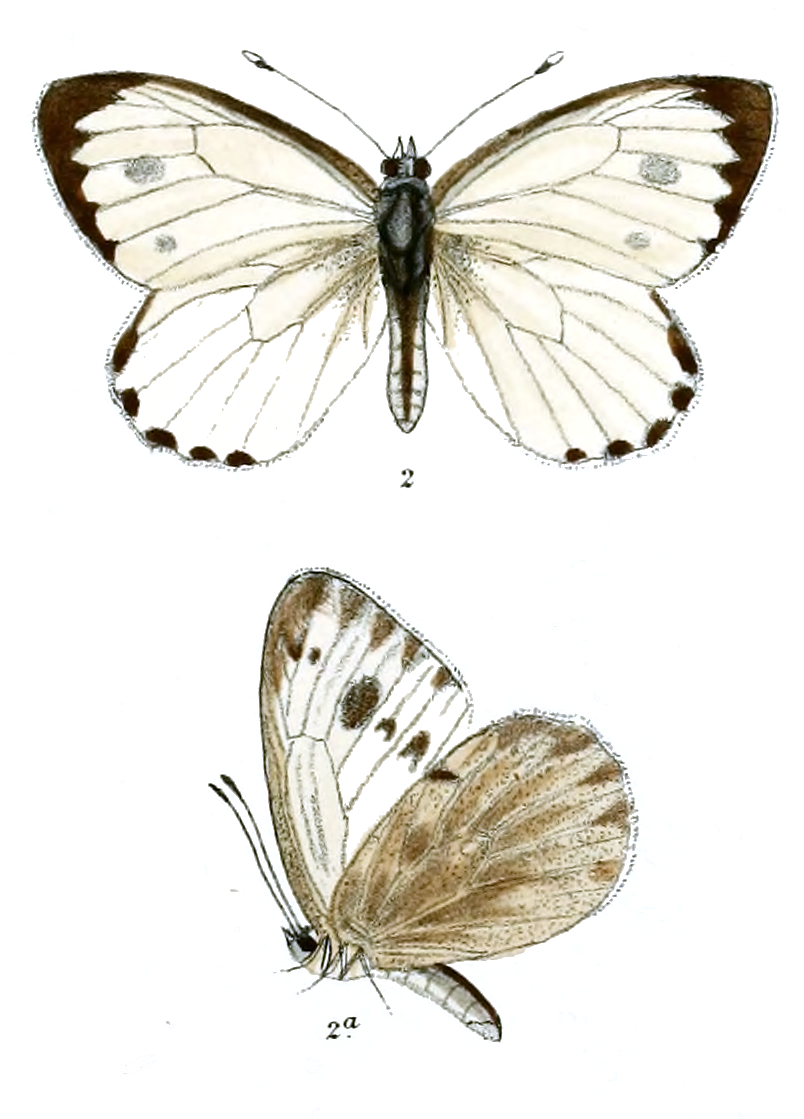

Scientific classification
- Kingdom: Animalia
- Phylum: Arthropoda
- Class: Insecta
- Order: Lepidoptera
- Family: Pieridae
- Genus: Pieris
- Species: P. deota

Binomial name
- Pieris deota (de Nicéville, 1884)

= Pieris deota =

Kashmir white

Species of butterfly

Pieris deota, the Kashmir white, is a small butterfly of the family Pieridae, that is, the yellows and whites, which is found in India, Pakistan, Tibet, and central Asia. It is found in the north-western Himalayas in Ladakh at 760 m (2,490 ft) and in Tibet and the Pamirs, at altitudes of 3,700–4,300 m (12,100–14,100 ft).

== Description ==
It closely resembles Pieris brassicae, from which it differs as follows:

Male has the upper forewing with inner margin of the black area on apex and termen not smoothly curved but sinuate (curved); an elongate narrow black spot, sometimes faint and ill defined but always traceable, in interspace 3. Hindwing: termen edged by a narrow continuous black band that extends from the black costal spot to the middle of interspace 3. Underside, forewing: apex and upper portion of termen ashy brown (by reason of the black on the upperside that shows through by transparency), thickly irrorated with black scales; besides the black spots in interspaces 1 and 3 present as in P. brassicae, there is a third black spot from middle of interspace 5 to vein 7 that extends above the latter vein diffusely to the costa. Hindwing: as in P. brassicae but the ground colour not so yellow; the black terminal band of the upperside can be seen through faintly by transparency; the black subcostal spot as in P. brassicce, with a second black spot in interspace 3.

Female has the upperside as in the female of P. brassicae, but as in the male of its own form, the inner margin of the black area at apex and on termen of forewing not smoothly curved but sinuate. Hindwing: a black terminal band like that in the male but broader and divided by the white veins into a series of inwardly diffuse subquadrate spots; a small black spot in interspace 3, another in interspace 5, the latter joined to the subcostal black spot which is particularly large and prominent. Underside as in the male.

== See also ==
- List of butterflies of India
- List of butterflies of India (Pieridae)
