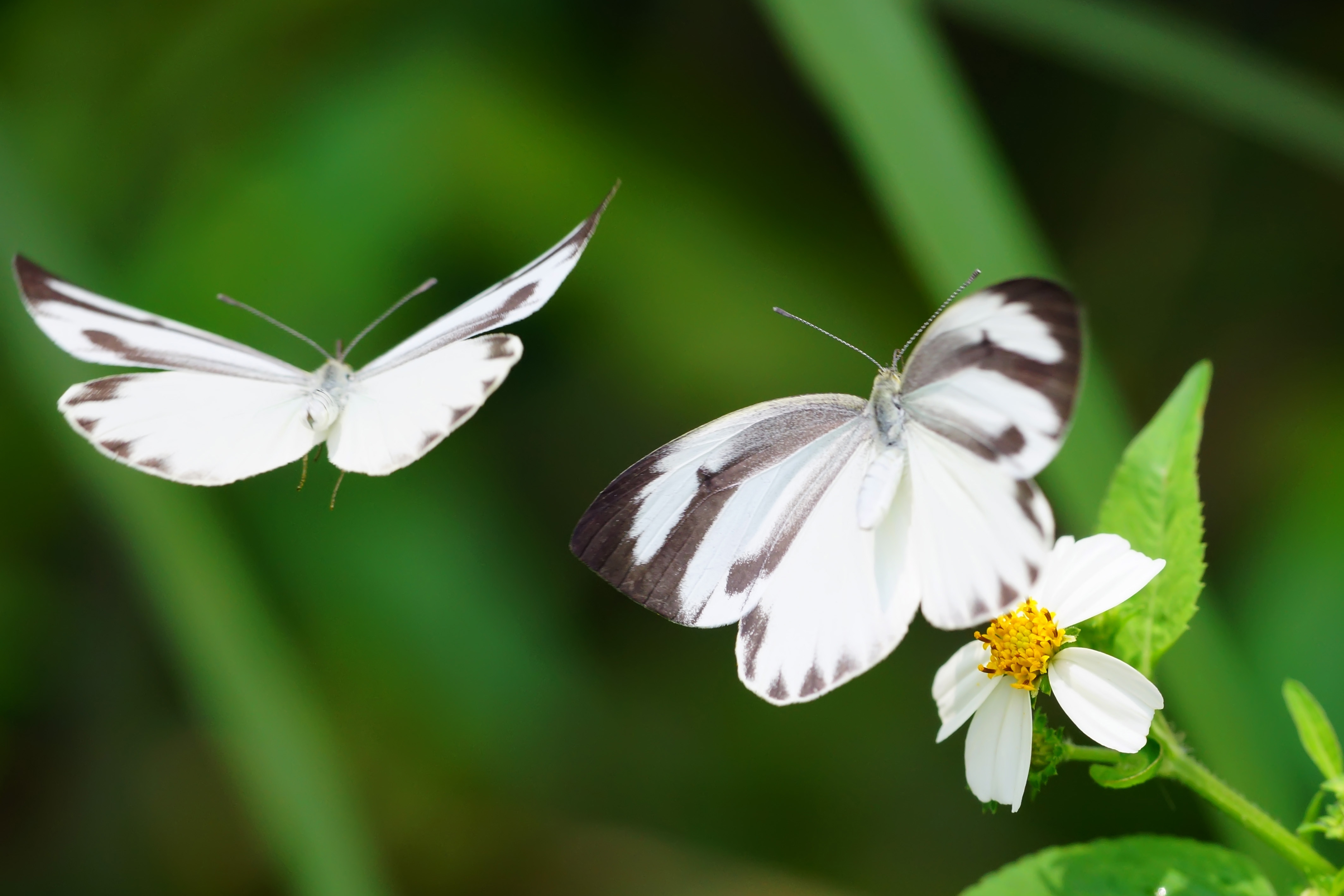
- Talbotia naganum karumii

Scientific classification
- Domain: Eukaryota
- Kingdom: Animalia
- Phylum: Arthropoda
- Class: Insecta
- Order: Lepidoptera
- Family: Pieridae
- Genus: Pieris
- Species: P. naganum

Binomial name
- Pieris naganum Moore, 1884

= Pieris naganum =

Naga white

Species of butterfly

Pieris naganum, the Naga white, is a small butterfly of the family Pieridae, that is, the yellows and whites, which is found in Assam and the Naga Hills in India and in Upper Myanmar.

== Description ==
The upperside of the male is white with the costa of the forewing irrorated (speckled) with black scales up to two-thirds of its length from the base, and also at the apex and the termen to vein 3. Discocellulars with a crescent-shaped black mark; a large elongate black spot in the middle of the interspace 3 produced outwards and joining with the black on the termen.

Hindwing uniform. The underside of the forewing white with the apex creamy white. Underside of the hindwing also ochraceous white.

Antennae black, speckled with white; head, thorax and abdomen above black and beneath white.

The wingspan is about 54 mm.

== See also ==
- List of butterflies of India
- List of butterflies of India (Pieridae)
