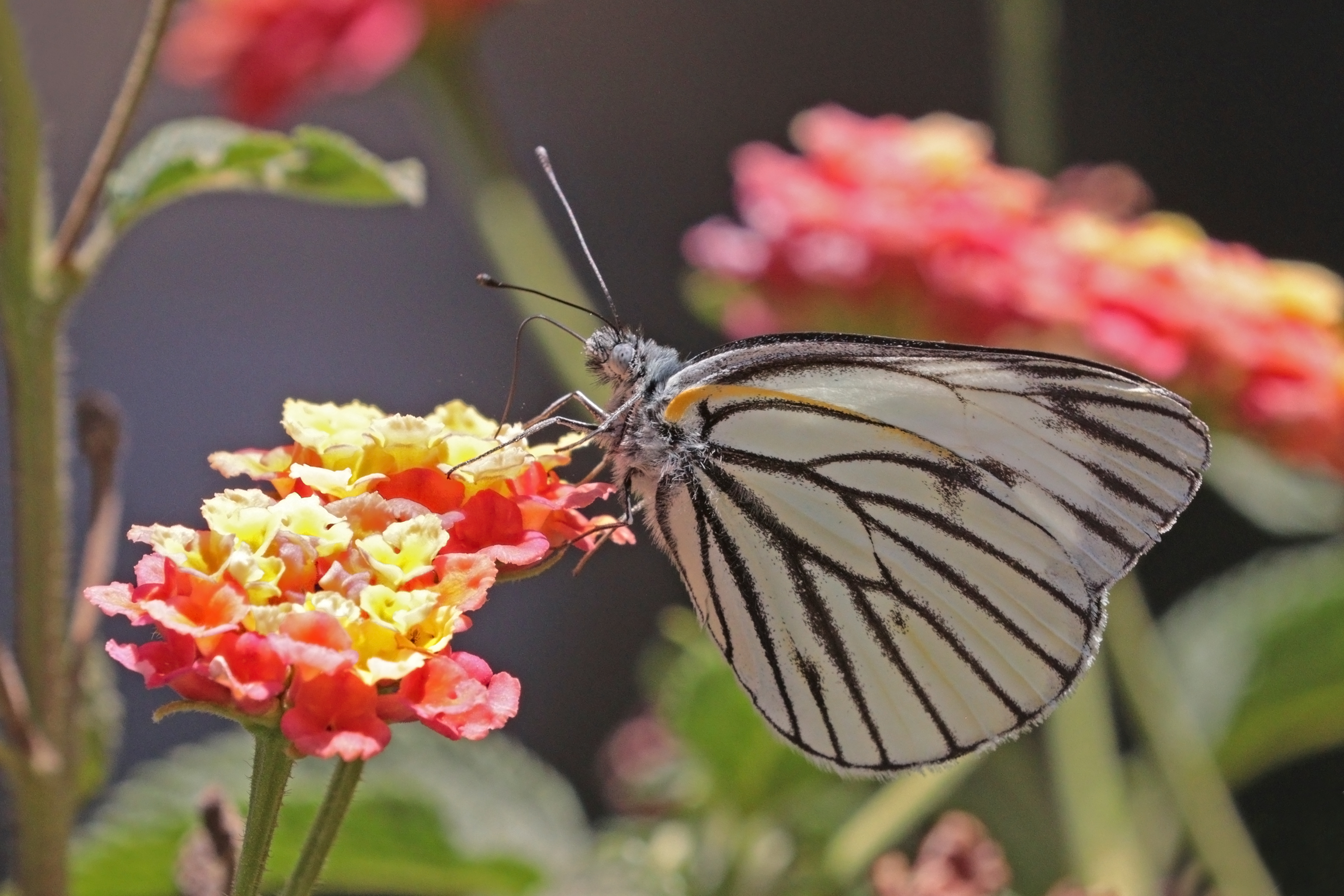
- P. b. brassicoides, Ethiopia

Conservation status
- Least Concern (IUCN 3.1)

Scientific classification
- Kingdom: Animalia
- Phylum: Arthropoda
- Class: Insecta
- Order: Lepidoptera
- Family: Pieridae
- Genus: Pieris
- Species: P. brassicoides

Binomial name
- Pieris brassicoides Guérin-Méneville, 1849

Synonyms
- Pieris brassicoides brassicoides f. hodsoni Carpenter, 1935; Pieris brassicoides f. ragazzii Storace, 1956; Pieris brassicoides bogalei Rougeot, 1980; Pieris brassicoides meridionalis Joicey and Talbot, 1922

= Pieris brassicoides =

Species of butterfly

Pieris brassicoides, the Ethiopian cabbage white, is a butterfly in the family Pieridae. It is found in Ethiopia and Tanzania. The habitat consists of montane areas.

The larvae feed on Tropaeolum majus and Brassica napus.

Pieris rapae is one of the closest relatives of this family.

== Subspecies ==
There are two subspecies:

- Pieris brassicoides brassicoides Guérin-Méneville, 1849 – highlands of Ethiopia above 2,000 meters, common
- Pieris brassicoides marghanita Hemming, 1941 – northern Tanzania above 2,000 meters, rare
