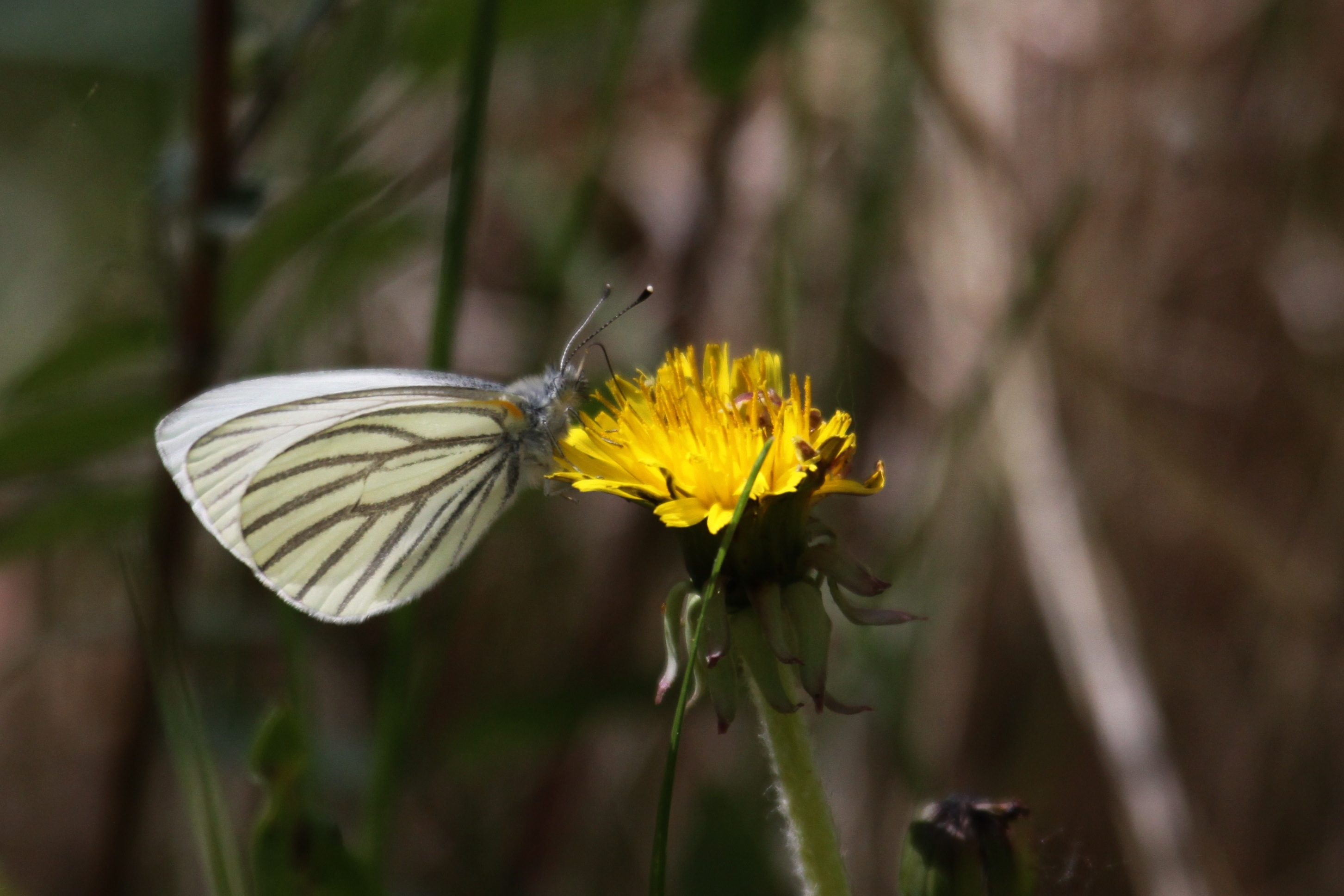

Conservation status
- Secure (NatureServe)

Scientific classification
- Kingdom: Animalia
- Phylum: Arthropoda
- Clade: Pancrustacea
- Class: Insecta
- Order: Lepidoptera
- Family: Pieridae
- Genus: Pieris
- Species: P. oleracea

Binomial name
- Pieris oleracea Harris, 1829

= Pieris oleracea =

Species of butterfly

Pieris oleracea, or more commonly known as the mustard white, is a butterfly in the family Pieridae native to a large part of Canada and the northeastern United States. The nearly all-white butterfly is often found in wooded areas or open plains. There are two seasonal forms, which make it distinct from other similar species. Because of climate change, populations are moving further north.

As indicated by the common name, P. oleracea adults and larvae primarily feed on plants in the mustard family, Brassicaceae. The species is threatened by the rapid, and monoculture-forming, spread of the invasive species Alliaria petiolata, which is toxic to larvae. Populations of P. oleracea have been declining. It may be that this butterfly is slowly adapting to garlic mustard. However, it may not be a fast enough process to ensure its survival, due to the high level of aggression on the part of the plant and the continuing encroachment of human development.

Its specific name oleracea means "related to vegetables/herbs" in Latin and is a form of holeraceus (oleraceus).

== Description ==
=== Larvae ===
Pieris oleracea eggs are yellow and shaped like cones, with vertical ridges. Larvae that are mature have many black spots with a green body, dark dorsal stripe, and short, dense hairs. The pupae can range in color from brown to white to green, and have dorsal and apical projections.

=== Adults ===
There are two seasonal forms of the butterfly, one for spring and one for summer. Above the wings, the butterfly is entirely white, which a small patch of black scales at the tips of the wings. A feature that differentiates this species from other similar species is the green or yellow markings on the underside of the hind wings that run along the veins. In the spring, the green markings are very apparent, and can be seen from the top side of the wing. In the summer, the wing appears almost entirely white, as the markings on the underside of the wing and the black tips are fainter.

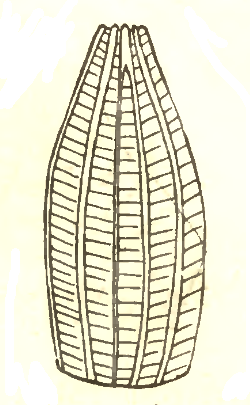
Drawing of P.oleracea egg

== Range ==
This species is mainly found throughout Canada and parts of the northeastern United States. They are often found with other very similar species in specific areas. Their range stretches across Canada starting from Newfoundland to Alberta and other Northwestern Territories. However, they are only found in the foothill regions of Alberta. In British Columbia, populations are found in north and central regions. In Nunavut, they are specifically found near the coast at Coppermine and Arviat. In the Cypress Hills of Saskatchewan, there is a single population that has been found. As for the United States, they are found in the New England states and Great Lakes area.

== Habitat ==
These butterflies are found in prairies, near streams, and in moist deciduous areas. In the spring, they are found more readily in the moist areas, either the woodlands or open fields.

Pieris oleracea is a biovoltine species, meaning it tends to have two broods seasonally. The time in which they fly can depend on the area the inhabit. Usually, the butterflies migrate once in June, and once again in late July. However, in southern Ontario, there can be three to four generations, and farther up north it has been observed where there is only one generation.

== Social behavior ==
Because of changing climate conditions, broods are expanding farther north.

There has been a steady decline in the populations of P. oleracea, which is being attributed to either climate change, the expansion of the toxic garlic mustard plant, human development, or, most likely, a combination of these factors.

During the day, males observe the population to look for females to mate with.

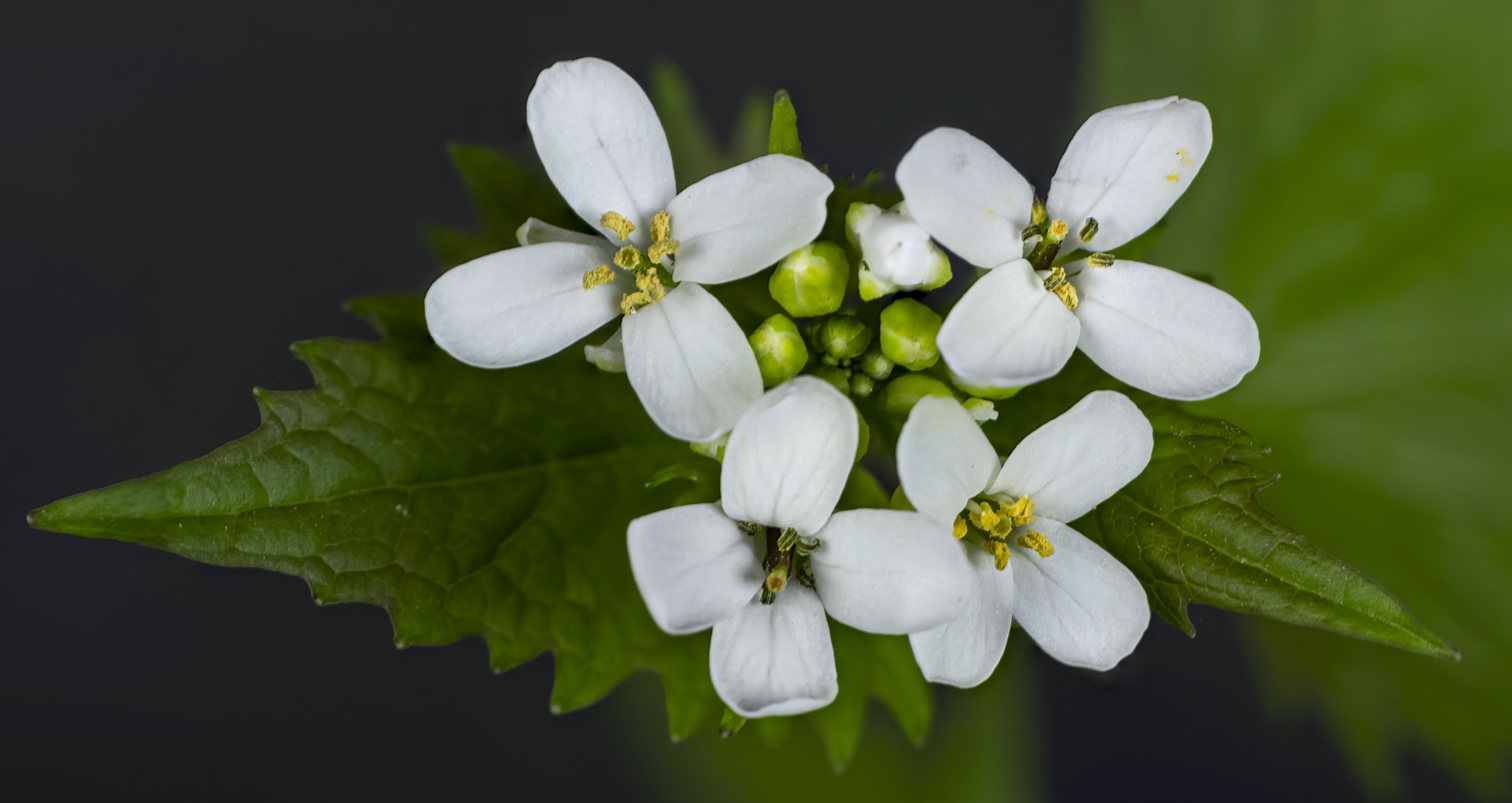
Close up image of Alliaria petiolata (garlic mustard)

== Host-plants ==
The larvae feed on various types of Brassicaceae, which can also be referred to as mustard plants. The most common of these types are Cardamines and Boechera, sometimes commonly known as bittercress and rockcress respectively. Adult butterflies will eat the nectar from these same plants.

There are certain mustard plants that are toxic to the butterflies. Alliaria petiolata, more commonly known as garlic mustard, is an example. Because this species is closely related to host mustards of P. oleracea, it is very similar to their commonly eaten plants, so these butterflies often feed on the toxic species. The native hosts of P. oleracea contain glucosinolates that are similar to those found in A. petiolata, which is why females are attracted to them. However, this specific species is toxic to larvae and causes death. Previous studies have shown that specifically in 1st and 4th instar larvae, several chemicals in A. petiolata reduce chances of survival because the larvae end up consuming less.

Some recent, short-term studies have shown that P. oleracea may be beginning to evolve to use A. petiolata as a host plant. A. petiolata is an extremely invasive species in much of the United States and is becoming increasingly common in areas with P. oleracea populations. The slow nature of this potential evolution (preliminarily estimated to be as high as 100 generations for it to possibly be occurring), coupled with the dominance of Alliaria petiolata as an invasive species, where it often creates dense herb layer monocultures on the forest floor, at forest edges, along streams, and in other habitats — and the smallness of the populations of P. oleracea, make passively waiting for this adaption to save the species questionable, particularly in light of the repeated blockage of biological control weevil species by the USDA's TAG group, despite multiple petitions from scientists for approval of even the monophagous weevil C. scrobicollis. Researchers have said that the univoltine nature of Pieris virginiensis, coupled with its rarity, makes A. petiolata potentially an even greater threat to its survival, due to a reduced ability to adapt.

== Local adaptation ==
The existence of the toxic A. petiolata is detrimental to the species, introduced into the United States in the 19th century. It is unclear to what degree it will remain a threat to the survival of this butterfly over time, due to potential adaption. This species of mustard plant contains the oviposition stimulant sinigrin. Females of this species react very strongly to sinigrin, especially when compared to similar species like P. rapae and P. virginiensis. In similar Pieridae species, sinigrin was found to negatively impact larval survival by affecting a pathway that transforms harmful substances into harmless ones.

With the increasing abundance of A. petiolata, there is concern about the potential adaption rate to what appears to be an incompatible, yet attractive to females, host plant. Studies were done in areas with and without garlic mustard, looking at female selection and larval survival success. One group of females were in an area where garlic mustard was widely established, and the other group was in an area where it was just recently introduced. Despite the fact that garlic mustard is non-native, females in the group with widespread garlic mustard showed an oviposition preference for it. The larvae in this group on the mustard plants had reduced survival rates than those on their normal native hosts. Females in the group with the newly introduced garlic mustard had a wide range in their selection of host plants, and the larval survival rates were also higher in general. Garlic mustard, however, creates monocultures due to its extreme success as an invasive species in the United States, where it lacks over seventy predators that occur in its native areas. This reduces food plant choice by pushing out the native mustards. When comparing the success rates of larvae on the garlic mustard between the two groups, the first group had higher survival success rates than the group with the newly introduced garlic mustard. The increasing selection of using A. petiolata may show an attempt by P. oleracea to adapt to this invasive species but the adaption may be too slow to compensate for the monoculture formation of the plant and the reduction of its host plants from human encroachment such as land development.

== Enemies ==
=== Alliaria petiolata ===
Alliaria petiolata is a toxic invasive species that is causing decreased survival in larval populations. Even though sinigrin is an oviposition stimulant for adult females, it has shown to be detrimental to larvae because it delays growth. Sinigrin is not found in normal host plants, and even though butterflies of the Pierid family have a detoxification system to remove the toxic chemical, it is not effective when large amounts are consumed.

Alliarinoside, a compound only found in A. petiolata, is also threat to the larvae. Although the exact mechanism is unknown, it has been shown that alliarinoside is responsible for lower survival rates of larvae. Another threat to larval growth is the cyanide produced by A. petiolata.

=== Pieris rapae ===
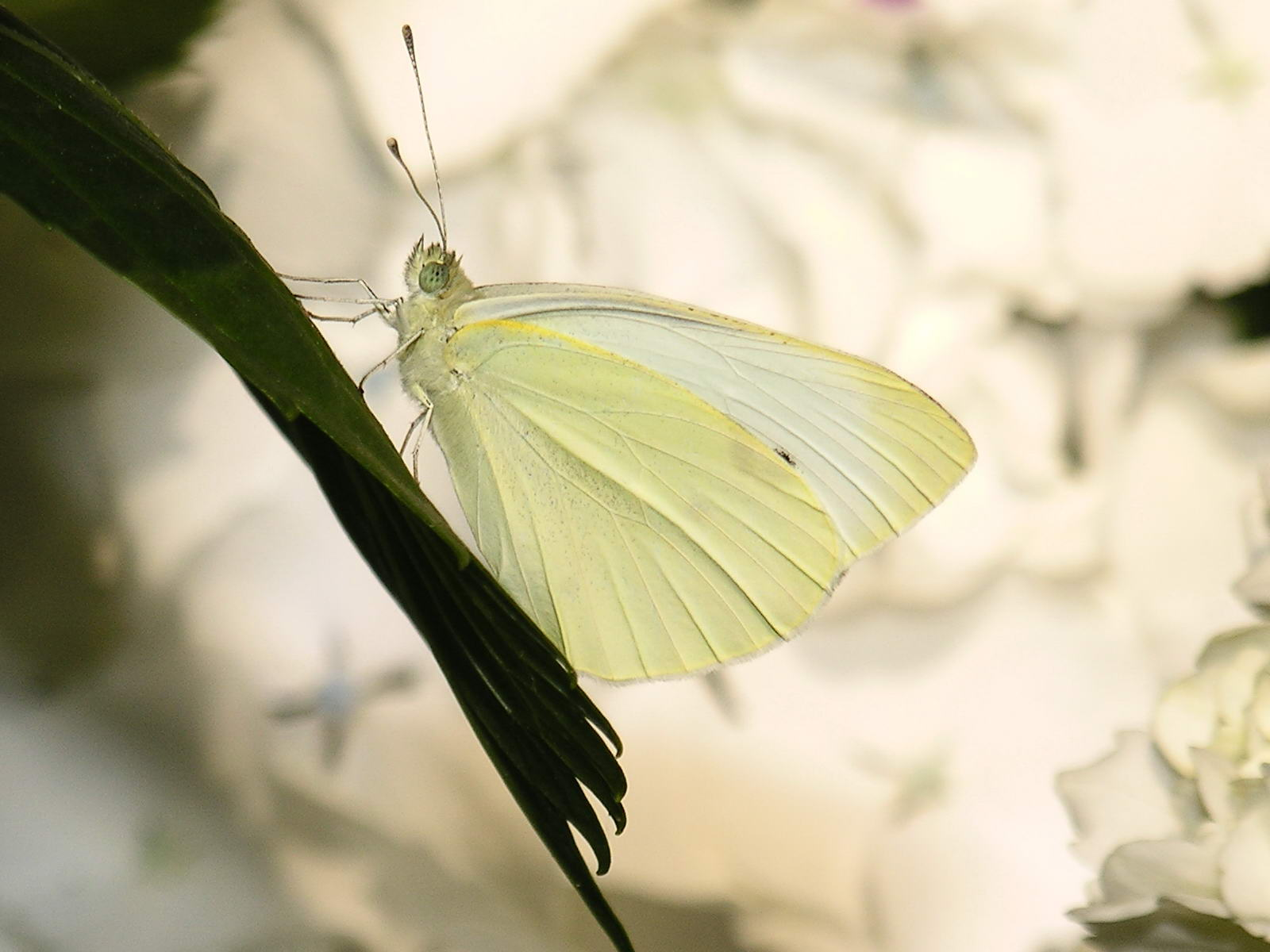
Image of Pieris rapae

Another potential enemy of P. oleracea is a member of its own genus, Pieris rapae. After introduction of this species in an area in New England populated by P. oleracea, the native populations were entirely wiped out. In many cases this appears to be because of competition for foraging sites. However, there has been a case observed where the two species were able to coexist successfully.

== Genetics ==
DNA barcode data of Pieris oleracea is available through the BOLD systems database and GenBank. The sequence cytochrome oxidase subunit 1 region, the typical region for DNA barcoding, was used and the FASTA file is available.

== Sympatry ==
A specific case of sympatry between P. oleracea and P. rapae was seen in Vermont. Even though the populations had approximately the same territory, each species was able to find a specific niche in the food source or habitat that the other could not use. P. oleracea larvae primarily used Dentaria diphylla during the spring, whereas P. rapae used Barbaea vulgaris in the spring. As for mating, there was no observed interference between the two species. Even though adults were in the same areas, there was no conflict.

== Similar species ==
- Pieris napi – green-veined white
- Pieris virginiensis – West Virginia white
- Pieris marginalis – margined white
