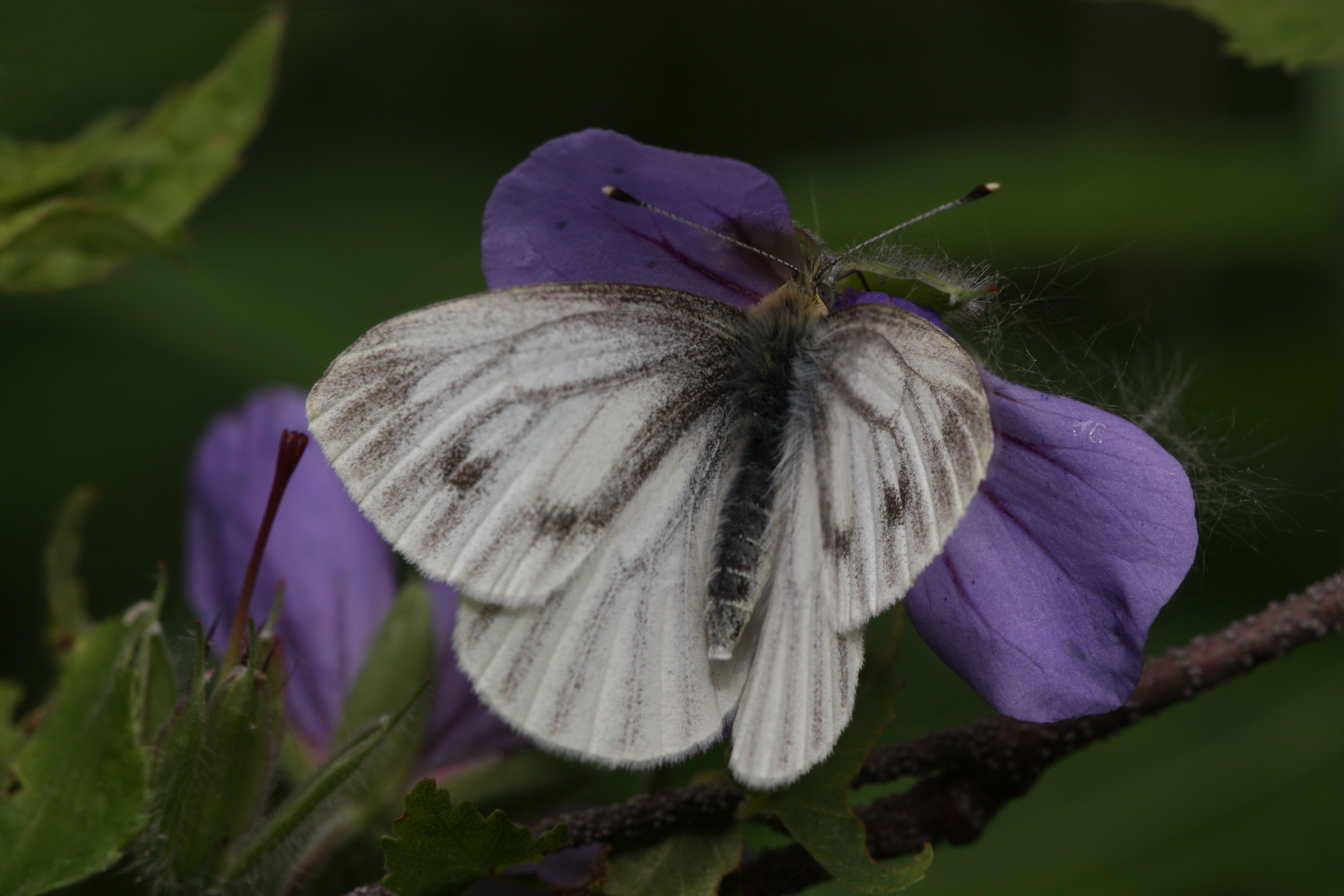
- Pieris angelika in Chugach State Park

Conservation status
- Secure (NatureServe)

Scientific classification
- Kingdom: Animalia
- Phylum: Arthropoda
- Clade: Pancrustacea
- Class: Insecta
- Order: Lepidoptera
- Family: Pieridae
- Genus: Pieris
- Species: P. angelika

Binomial name
- Pieris angelika Eitschberger, 1983

= Pieris angelika =

Species of butterfly

Pieris angelika, the Arctic white, is a cold-climate butterfly of the family Pieridae. Its main range is in north-western Canada (Yukon, Northwest Territories, north-western British Columbia) and Alaska. Its taxonomic name may change in the future, because it was previously described and named before 1983.

== Features ==
Adult butterflies have an average wingspan of 33 to 42mm.

Viewed from above, males are mostly white, with a thin black line in the costa and margin. Black shading can also be seen on the wings. The underside of the males can be a pale yellow, and are often seen with dark green veins.

Females can be white or yellow and often exhibit dark scaling and patches along the veins.
