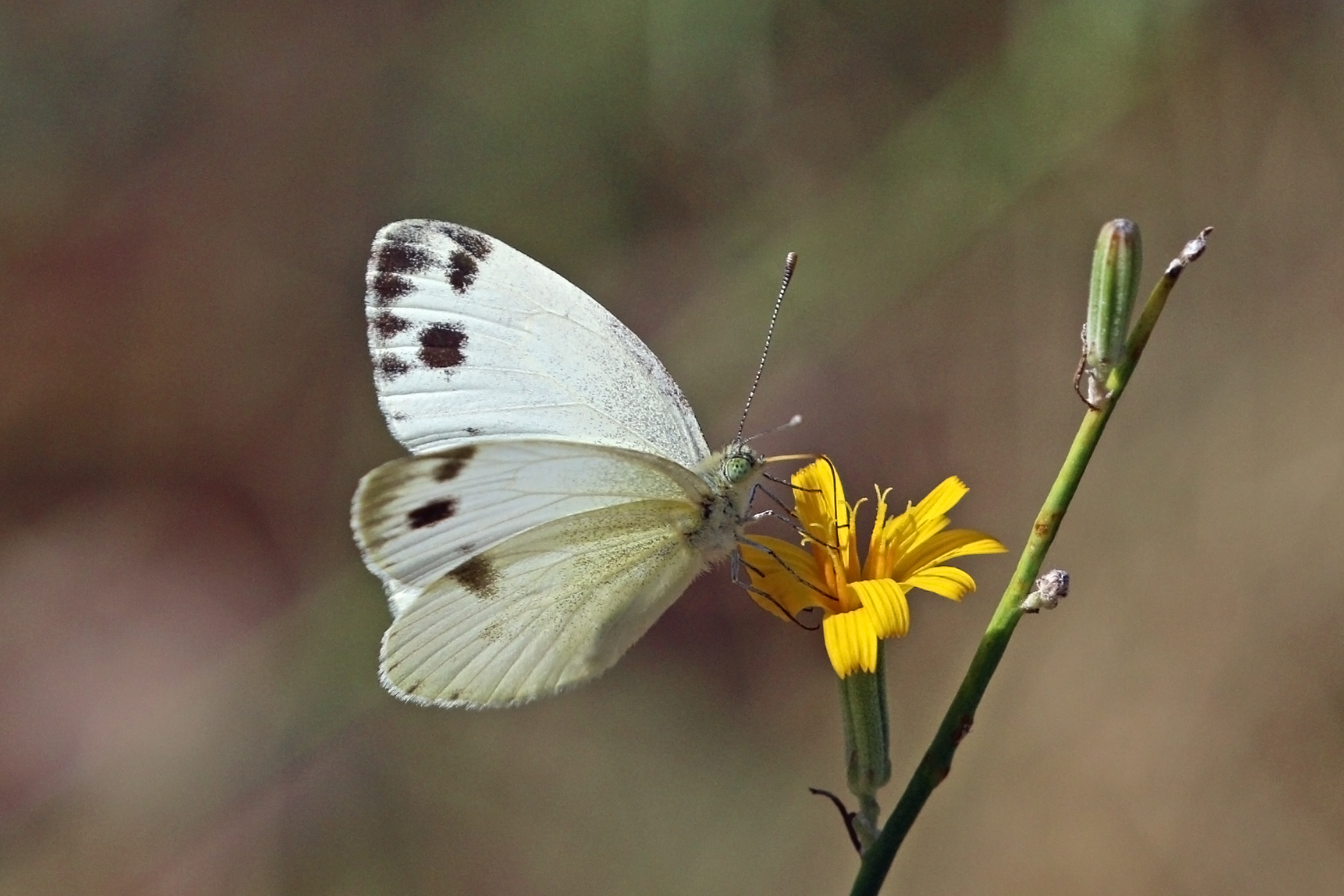

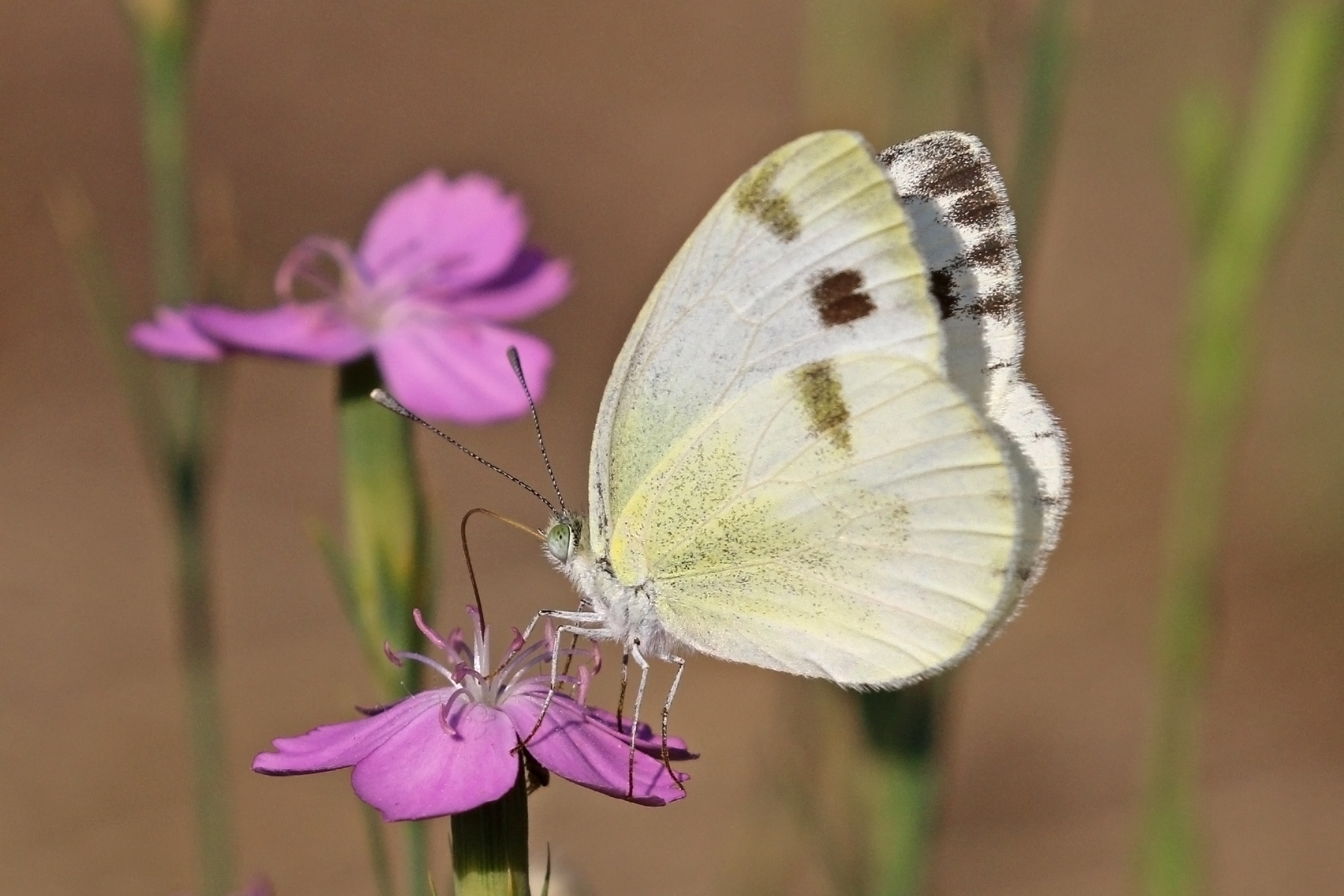
- both in Bulgaria

Scientific classification
- Kingdom: Animalia
- Phylum: Arthropoda
- Class: Insecta
- Order: Lepidoptera
- Family: Pieridae
- Genus: Pieris
- Species: P. krueperi

Binomial name
- Pieris krueperi Staudinger, 1860

Synonyms
- Pieris krueperi var. vernalis Staudinger, 1870

= Pieris krueperi =

Krueper's small white

Species of butterfly

Pieris krueperi, the Krueper's small white, is a butterfly in the family Pieridae. It is found on the Balkan Peninsula and in Iran, Baluchistan, the Kopet-Dagh and from Asia Minor to Central Asia, as well as in Oman. The habitat consists arid areas with scanty vegetation up to 2,500 metres (8,200 ft) in the mountains.

The wingspan is 44–54 millimetres (1.7–2.1 in).

== Description in Seitz ==
P. krueperi Stgr. (20b) occurs in Greece, Asia Minor, Persia and other districts of Western Asia.This species differs from its allies in possessing on the forewing a black subapical costal spot and several, well separated, black distal marginal ones. In the summer-form, which is name-typical, the underside is white with yellowish margins, while in the spring-form, vernalis Stgr. (20b), the larger proximal portion of the hindwing beneath is greenish grey. — The Central -Asiatic spring-form, verna Gr.-Grsh., is whitebeneath, but bears dark markings. — The Pamir form, mahometana Gr-.-Grsh.[now species Pieris mahometana (Grum-Grshimailo, 1888) (northeastern Afghanistan and Pamirs)], is above margined with black and beneath much darker. In the female the black spots are enlarged and partly confluent.

== Biology ==
Adults are on wing from April to September in two or three generations per year.

The larvae feed on Alyssum (including Alyssum montanum) and Aurinia species.

== Subspecies ==
- Pieris krueperi krueperi
- Pieris krueperi devta (de Nicéville, [1884]) (Tian-Shan, Ghissar, southern Ghissar, Darvaz, Alai, western Pamirs)
