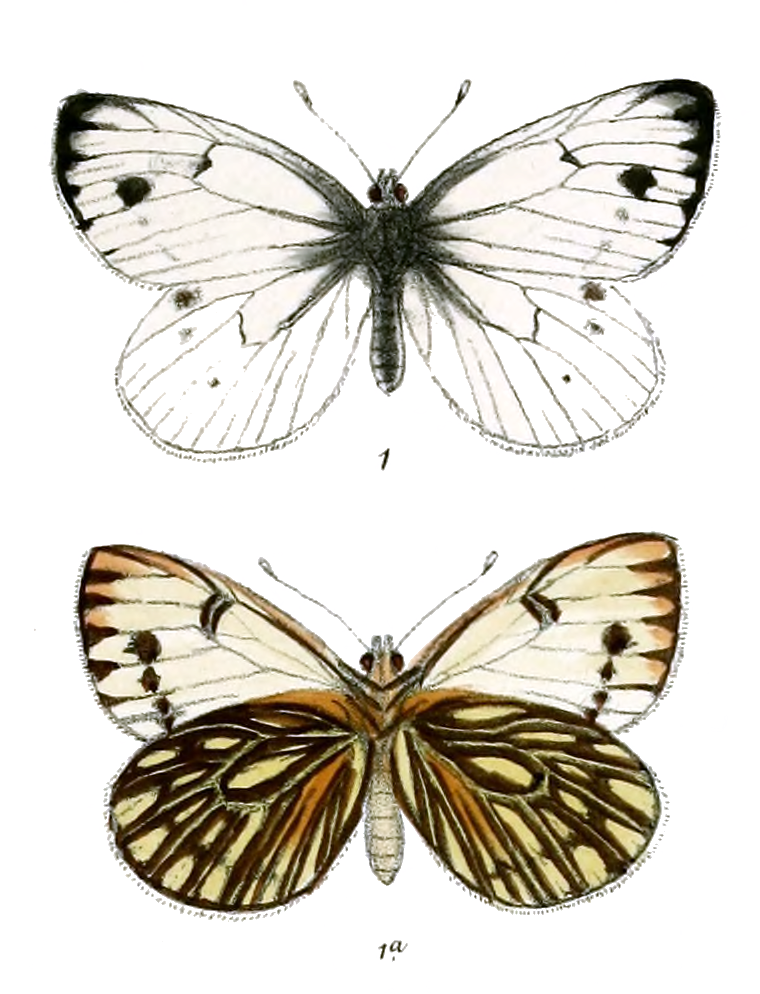

Scientific classification
- Domain: Eukaryota
- Kingdom: Animalia
- Phylum: Arthropoda
- Class: Insecta
- Order: Lepidoptera
- Family: Pieridae
- Genus: Pieris
- Species: P. chumbiensis

Binomial name
- Pieris chumbiensis (de Nicéville, 1897)

Synonyms
- Pieris dubernardi chumbiensis

= Pieris chumbiensis =

Chumbi white

Species of butterfly

Pieris chumbiensis, the Chumbi white, is a small butterfly of the family Pieridae, the yellows and whites. It is found in the Chumbi Valley of Sikkim in India, and was once considered a race of P. dubernardi.

== Description ==
Male upperside ground colour is white. Forewing has veins black, costal and terminal margins narrowly, apex more broadly, black; the inner margin of the black at apex forms an even curve; a large round black spot in middle of interspace 3, the lower discocellular edged on either side with black and the base of the wing irrorated with black scales. Hindwing: with a dark greyish appearance due to the dark markings of the underside that show through by transparency; veins black; a black costal spot a little before the apex, and the base of the wing heavily irrorated with black scales. Underside: forewing white, veins edged with black scaling, the round black spot in interspace 3 as on the upperside; apex and terminal margin suffused with yellow that decreases posteriorly on the latter. Hindwing: yellow, all the veins very broadly edged with black that gives an appearance of streaks to the ground colour; precostal area edged with deep cadmium yellow. Antennae, head, thorax and abdomen fuscous black. Female undescribed.

It has a wingspan of 54–58 mm.

== See also ==
- List of butterflies of India
- List of butterflies of India (Pieridae)
