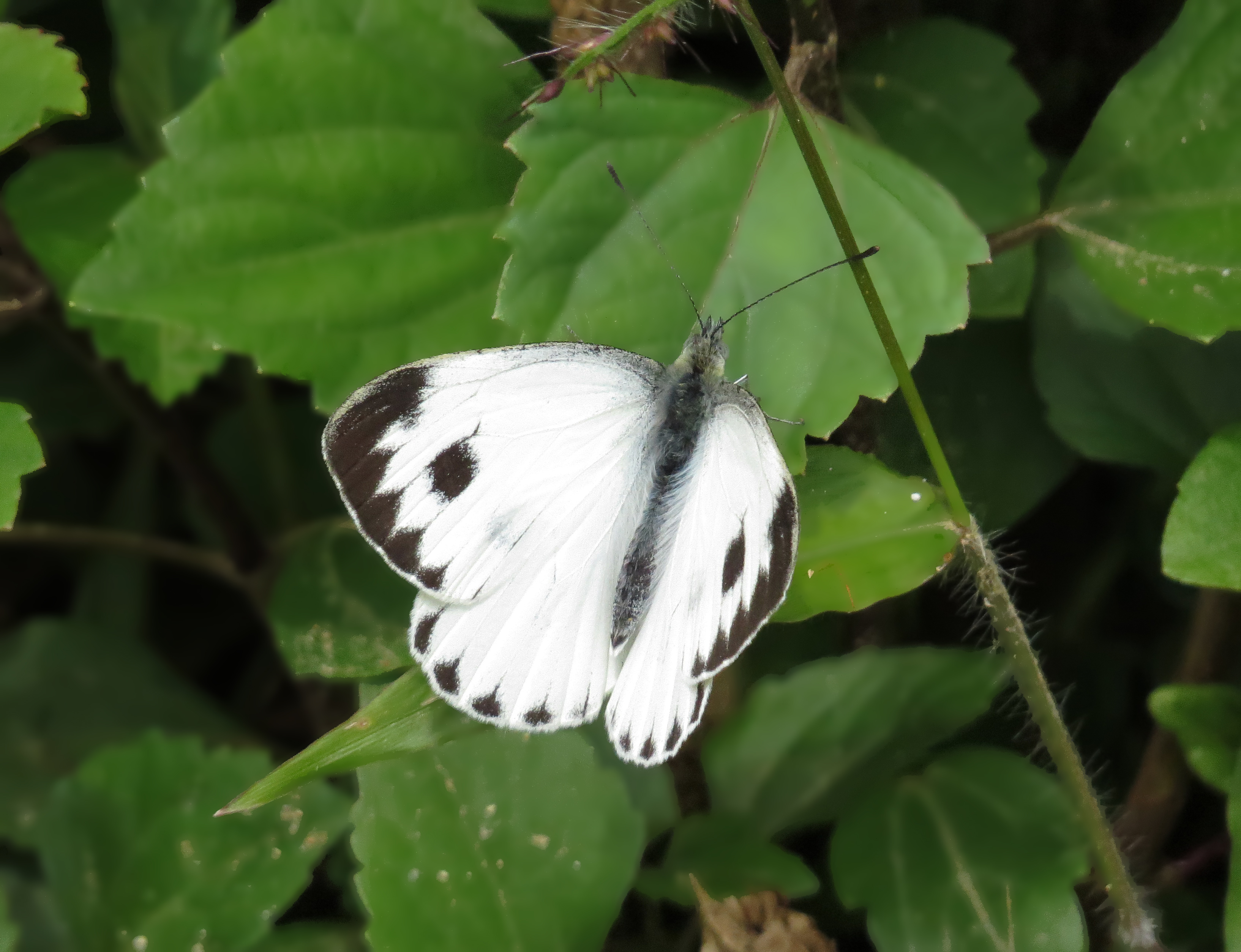
- Dorsal view
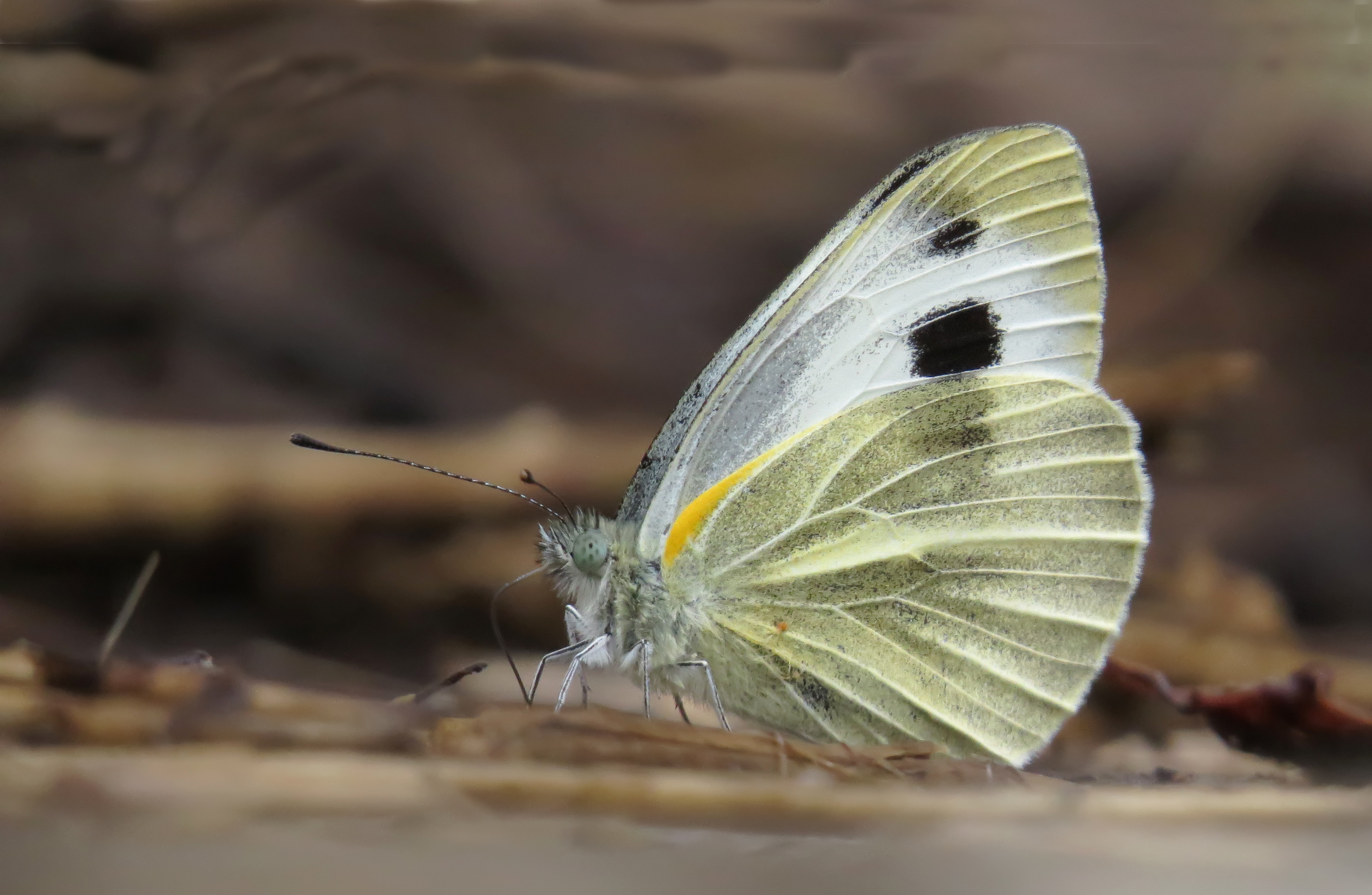
- Ventral view

Scientific classification
- Kingdom: Animalia
- Phylum: Arthropoda
- Class: Insecta
- Order: Lepidoptera
- Family: Pieridae
- Genus: Pieris
- Species: P. canidia

Binomial name
- Pieris canidia (Sparrman, 1768)

= Pieris canidia =

Indian cabbage white

Species of butterfly

Pieris canidia, the Indian cabbage white, is a butterfly in the family Pieridae found in India, Nepal and Indochina. Pieris rapae is one of the most closely related species in the Pieridae.

== Description ==
The male is white to pale cream on its upperside. The base of the forewing, the basal portion of the costa, and the base and upper margin of the cell have a scattering of black scales. It is black from the apex to about the middle of the terminal margin. On the latter the black extends for a very short distance triangularly along the veins. There is a round black spot in interspace 3. The hindwing has a subcostal black spot as in Pieris rapae but is generally larger and more conspicuous, and a series of four or five terminal black spots that vary in size at the apices of the veins.

Underside: the forewing is white; cell and costa are lightly irrorated (speckled) with black scales; apex is somewhat broadly tinged with ochraceous yellow. Interspaces 1, 3 and 5 have conspicuous subquadrate black spots; the spot in interspace 1 sometimes extends out of interspace 1. That in interspace 5 is ill-defined. Hindwing: from pale, almost white, to dark ochraceous, thickly irrorated all over (with the exception of a longitudinal streak in the cell, and in the darker specimens similar longitudinal streaks in the interspaces) with black scales; costa above vein 8 are chrome yellow. Antennae are black with minute white specks; the long hairs on the head and thorax are greenish grey; the abdomen is black. Beneath, the head, thorax and abdomen are white.

The female is similar to the male on the underside, but the scattering of black scales is more prominent; the black on the apex and termen of the forewing and the black spots on the termen of the hindwing are broader and more extended inwards; on the forewing there is an additional spot in interspace 1, and both this and the spot in interspace 3 in many specimens are connected by a line of black scales along the veins to the outer black border; also the spot in interspace 1 often extends across vein 1 into the interspace below.

It has a wingspan of 42–60 mm.

== Distribution ==
It lives in sub-Himalayan India and Pakistan from Chitral, Kashmir to Sikkim and Bhutan, from 2,000 to 11,000 ft (610 to 3,350 m) elevation; the hills of southern India; Assam; Upper Myanmar: the Shan States; extending to China.

== See also ==
- List of butterflies of India
- List of butterflies of India (Pieridae)
