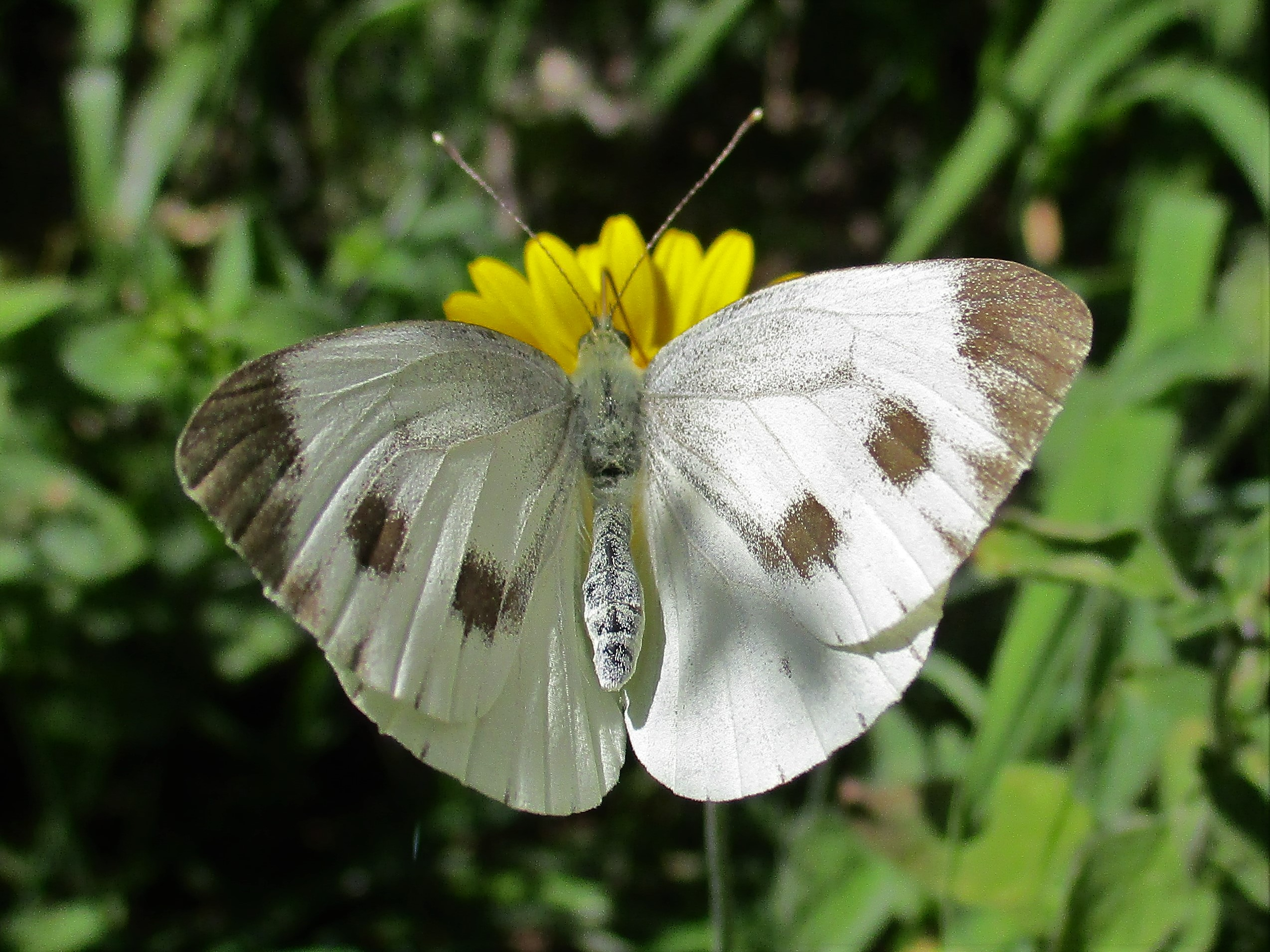

Conservation status
- Least Concern (IUCN 3.1)

Scientific classification
- Kingdom: Animalia
- Phylum: Arthropoda
- Class: Insecta
- Order: Lepidoptera
- Family: Pieridae
- Genus: Pieris
- Species: P. balcana

Binomial name
- Pieris balcana Lorkovic, 1970

= Pieris balcana =

Species of butterfly

Pieris balcana, the Balkan green-veined white, is a species of butterfly within the family Pieridae. The species has white upper wings with darkened apex tips. Females contain 2 dark spots on the forewing whereas males only contain 1 that are sometimes absent. The underside of the wings is yellowish with gray scales running along the veins of the wings. The species can be differentiated from the similar Pieris napi from the underside wing gray scales being more spread out and faded, compared to the scales of P. napi being more sharply defined.

== Ecology ==
Pieris balcana occurs in Balkans in regions from Croatia to southwestern Bulgaria and central Greece at elevations up to 1,300 metres (4,270 ft). The species inhabits vegetated areas alongside hedges and edges of woodland and woodland clearings. Forest habitats the species inhabits include broadleaf deciduous forests, coniferous woodlands, and mixed woodlands. Eggs are laid on various Brassicaceae members which the larvae feed on, where the adult generations then occur from March to October.

== Conservation ==
Pieris balcana has been assessed as a 'Least concern' species by the IUCN Red List in 2009 due to it having a large occurrence and population size of more than 10,000 adult individuals with no decline in populations of more than 25% in the previous 10 years. It also occurs in a number of protected areas across its range.
