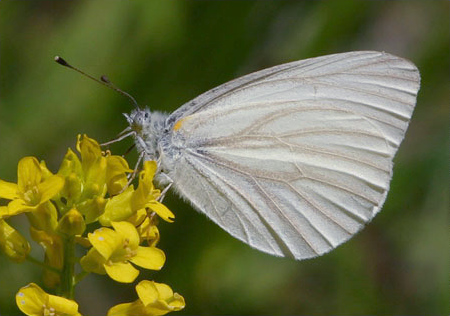
- On wild mustard

Conservation status
- Apparently Secure (NatureServe)

Scientific classification
- Kingdom: Animalia
- Phylum: Arthropoda
- Clade: Pancrustacea
- Class: Insecta
- Order: Lepidoptera
- Family: Pieridae
- Genus: Pieris
- Species: P. virginiensis

Binomial name
- Pieris virginiensis Edwards, 1870
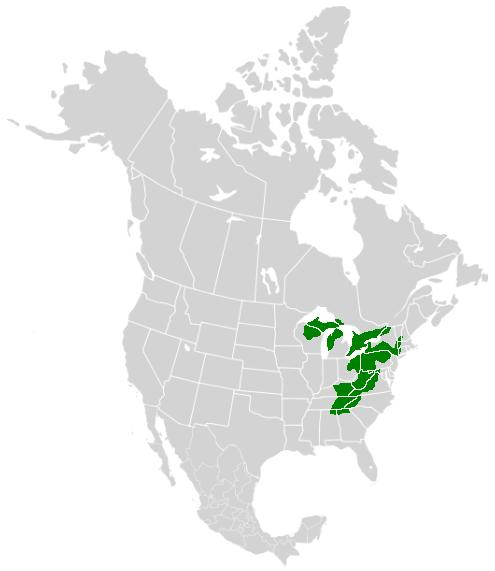

= Pieris virginiensis =

West Virginia white

Species of butterfly

Pieris virginiensis, the West Virginia white, is a butterfly found in North America in the Great Lakes states, along the Appalachians from New England to Alabama, and in southern Ontario. They are often found in moist deciduous forests. Forestry, development, and a highly-invasive species that it confuses with its host plant (Cardamine) are causing this species to decline. Two members of the Cardamine genus Cardamine diphylla and Cardamine concatenata are reported to be its host plants in Alabama.

This small, white semi-transparent butterfly may have no yellowish tinge, but it can have tawny or gray color and hazy brown or pale gray color in the hindwing vein underside. There is only one generation that is produced each year, and they are active adults for a short period of about one month, typically early spring (April or May), when they emerge despite potential dry springs. When P. virginiensis experience dry springs, they often do not survive as they rely on the prosperity of their native host plant for oviposition.

== Range and location ==
P. virginensis was originally native on the east coast of the United States and central Canada, but became established in new habitats within North America in the 1870s. Presently, its range included the Great Lakes, the Appalachian area, New York, Pennsylvania, southern Ontario, and southwestern New England. The West Virginia White is generally sedentary and rarely crosses open habitat, and often stays in shaded forest areas which limits its natural dispersal ability. There is a present decline in the population of Pieris virginiensis, due to the invasion of Alliaria petiolata (garlic mustard) into the native habitat of Pieris virginiensis. This invasive plant negatively impacts Pieris virginiensis populations due to the confusion with its native host plant, Cardamine diphylla.

== Native host ==
Cardamine diphylla, commonly known as two- leafed toothwort, is one of the early blooms of the spring season and belongs to the family of plants called Brassicaceae, which also includes Alliaria petiolata; garlic mustard, a non-native and invasive wildflower. Similar to the other members of the Brassicaceae family, Cardamine diphylla is a plant that uses chemical elements to attract Pieris virginiensis for pollination. The females lay eggs on the undersides of a cruciferae Cardamine diphylla, depositing one egg per leaf on the host plant, as the larvae will feed on the foliage of the host. The egg stage will last about 3–8 days, larvae will develop for 15–20 days and may overwinter in the pupal stage throughout summer, fall, and winter, pupate for multiple seasons before emerging as adults in the spring. After larvae emerge from eggs and begin to develop, they do not rely on the Alliaria petiolata as their food source because they are unable to eat it once they're born. However, the caterpillars are able to feed on the leaves of the Cardamine diphylla. Furthermore, if the habitat integrity is not kept at its preferred rich and shaded woodland environment state, there is a possibility of losing all the Pieris virginiensis. In the forest community, the Cardamine diphylla are early spring and one of the first pollinators of the year and a host to Pieris virginiensis, which makes them a rich nectar source. Cardamine diphylla are also known to be an indicator of a healthy and relatively undistributed woodland habitat. Therefore, the presence of invasive plant species and the decline of Cardamine diphylla are among the various ecological factors that pose a threat to forest communities during the early spring by disrupting ecological integrity.

== Invasive host ==
Along with the butterfly Pieris oleracea, it is threatened by the invasive weed garlic mustard, Alliaria petiolata. The butterflies, having not evolved to be familiar with the plant, confuse it with their host plants. The offspring laid on garlic mustard do not survive.Allaria petiolata is an invasive plant that was introduced into the native habitat of Pieris virginiensis, which causes a rapid decline in Allaria petiolata population. This rapid decline is due to a “mismatch event,” where P. virginiensis lays its eggs on the invasive plant instead of its host plant, Cardamine diphylla. This phenomenon is a key concept in evolutionary ecology, as invasive plants are capable of “tricking” native species through similar chemical signals. When Pieris virginiensis detects these chemical signals given off by A. petiolata, it thinks it found a safe place to lay its eggs. However, the chemical signals given off by the invasive plant are highly toxic to P. virginiensis, and results in larval death. As A. petiolata is an introduced species, P. virginiensis has not been able to evolve alongside the invasive garlic mustard, which means it cannot recognize the plant's toxicity to its larvae. This creates an “evolutionary mismatch,” as the butterfly's behavior that was once adaptive now becomes maladaptive in the new environment with invasive species.

== Ecological role ==
Ecologically, Pieris virginiensis is an important pollinator in forested areas, but it faces competition from the introduced Cabbage White, known as Pieris rapae, which competes for nectar and larval food plants. Also, the Pieris rapae introduced the exotic parasitoid wasp Cotesia glomerata for biological control of Cabbage White, which also attacks the Pieris virginiensis and other native species. The long-term population decline associated with habitat loss and fragmentation caused by European settlement is 30-70%, while the short term population decline is around 10-30% in Canada and the U.S. Although some reforestation areas have developed, these are highly fragmented habitats that lead to isolation among the populations and limit the gene flow.

== Literary references ==
In line 316 of Pale Fire by Vladimir Nabokov, this butterfly is referenced: “The Toothwort White haunted our woods in May.” The moniker refers to its habit of laying eggs on the toothwort.

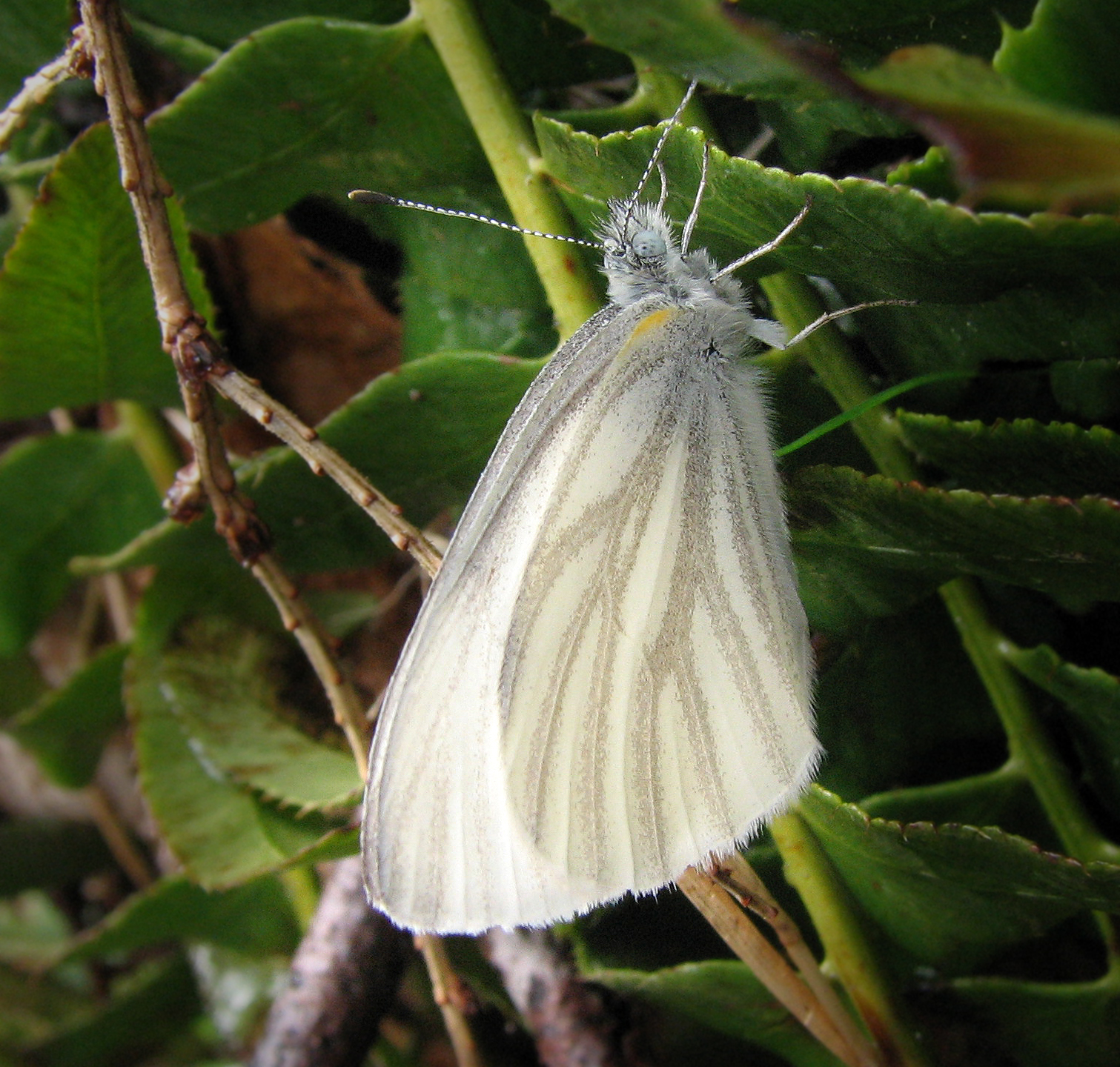
West Virginia
