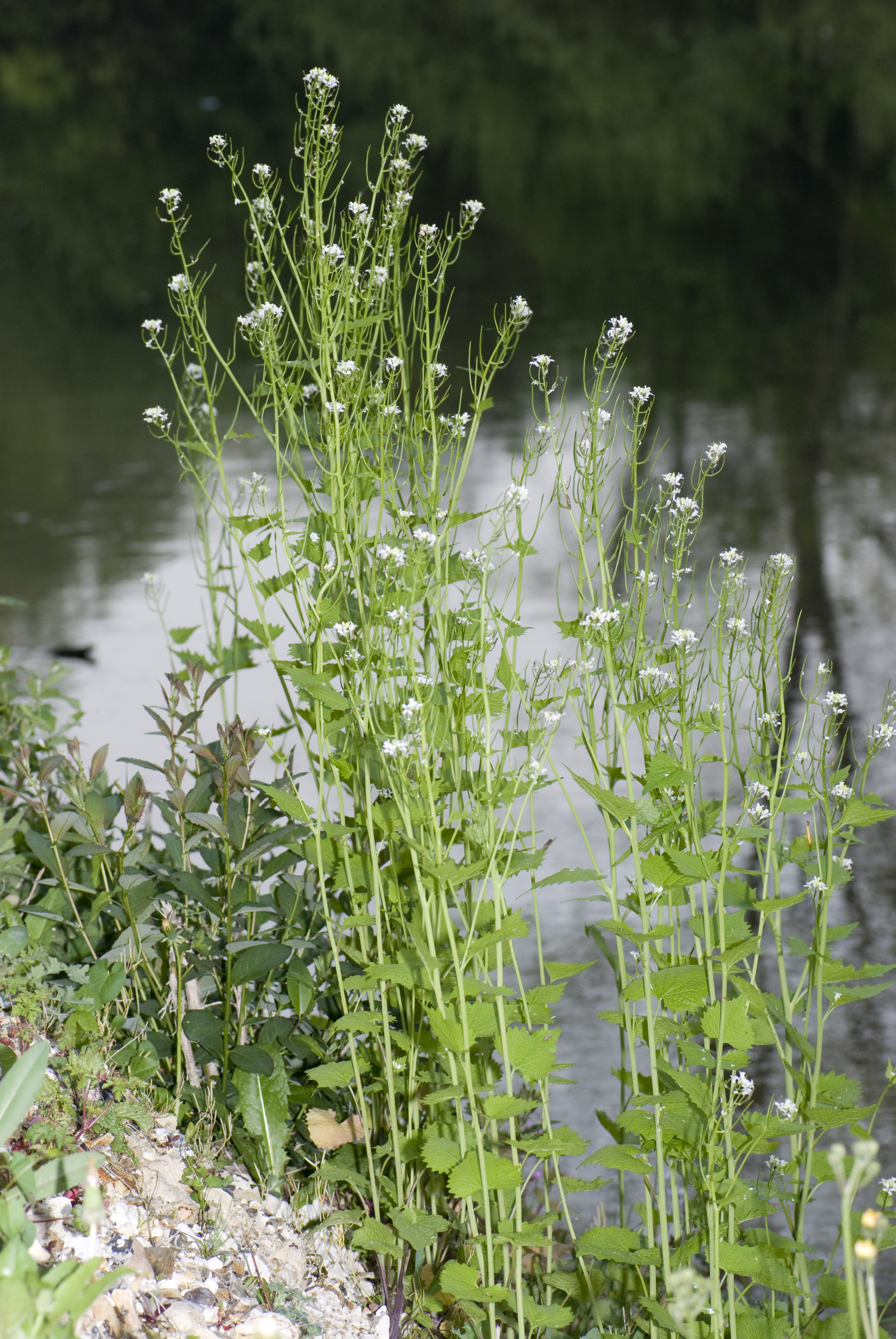

Scientific classification
- Kingdom: Plantae
- Clade: Tracheophytes
- Clade: Angiosperms
- Clade: Eudicots
- Clade: Rosids
- Order: Brassicales
- Family: Brassicaceae
- Genus: Alliaria
- Species: A. petiolata

Binomial name
- Alliaria petiolata (M.Bieb.) Cavara & Grande

Synonyms
- Alliaria alliacea (Salisb.) Britten & Rendle; Alliaria alliaria (L.) Huth; Alliaria fuchsii Rupr.; Alliaria mathioli Rupr.; Arabis alliaria Bernh.; Arabis petiolata M.Bieb.; Clypeola alliacea Crantz; Crucifera alliaria (L.) E.H.L.Krause; Erysimum alliaceum Salisb.; Erysimum alliaria L.; Erysimum cordifolium Pall.; Hesperis alliaria (L.) Lam.; Pallavicinia alliaria (L.) Cocc.; Sisymbrion alliarium St.-Lag.; Sisymbrium alliaria (L.) Scop.; Sisymbrium truncatum Dulac

= Alliaria petiolata =

Species of flowering plant in the cabbage family

Alliaria petiolata, or garlic mustard, is a biennial flowering plant in the mustard family (Brassicaceae). It is native to Europe, western and central Asia, north-western Africa, Morocco, Iberia and the British Isles, north to northern Scandinavia, and east to northern Pakistan and Xinjiang in western China. It has now become a tenacious invasive plant across the northern U.S., in particular because of its earlier springtime emergence than many native species, often in the forest understory.

In the first year of growth, plants form clumps of round, slightly wrinkled leaves, that when crushed smell like garlic. The plants flower in spring of the next year, producing cross-shaped white flowers in dense clusters. As the flowering stems bloom they elongate into a spike-like shape. When flowering is complete, plants produce upright fruits that release seeds in mid-summer. Plants are often found growing along the margins of hedges, giving rise to the old British folk name of jack-by-the-hedge. Other common names include garlic root, hedge garlic, sauce-alone, jack-in-the-bush, penny hedge and poor man's mustard. The genus name Alliaria, "resembling Allium", refers to the garlic-like odour of the crushed foliage. All parts of the plant, including the roots, have this smell.

== Description ==
It is an herbaceous biennial plant growing from a deeply growing, thin, whitish taproot scented like horseradish. In their first years, plants are rosettes of green leaves close to the ground; these rosettes remain green through the winter and develop into mature flowering plants the following spring. Second-year plants often grow from 30–100 cm (12–39 in) tall, rarely to 130 cm (51 in) tall. The leaves are stalked, triangular through heart-shaped, 10–15 cm (3.9–5.9 in) long (of which about half being the petiole) and 5–9 cm (2.0–3.5 in) broad, with coarsely toothed margins. The flowers are produced in spring and summer in small clusters. Each small flower has four white petals 4–8 mm (0.2–0.3 in) long and 2–3 mm (0.08–0.12 in) broad, arranged in a cross shape. The fruit is an erect, slender, four-sided capsule 4–5.5 cm (1.6–2.2 in) long, called a silique, green maturing to pale grey brown, containing two rows of small shiny black seeds which are released when a silique splits open. A single plant can produce hundreds of seeds, which often scatter several meters from the parent plant.

Depending upon conditions, garlic mustard flowers either self-fertilize or are cross-pollinated by a variety of insects.

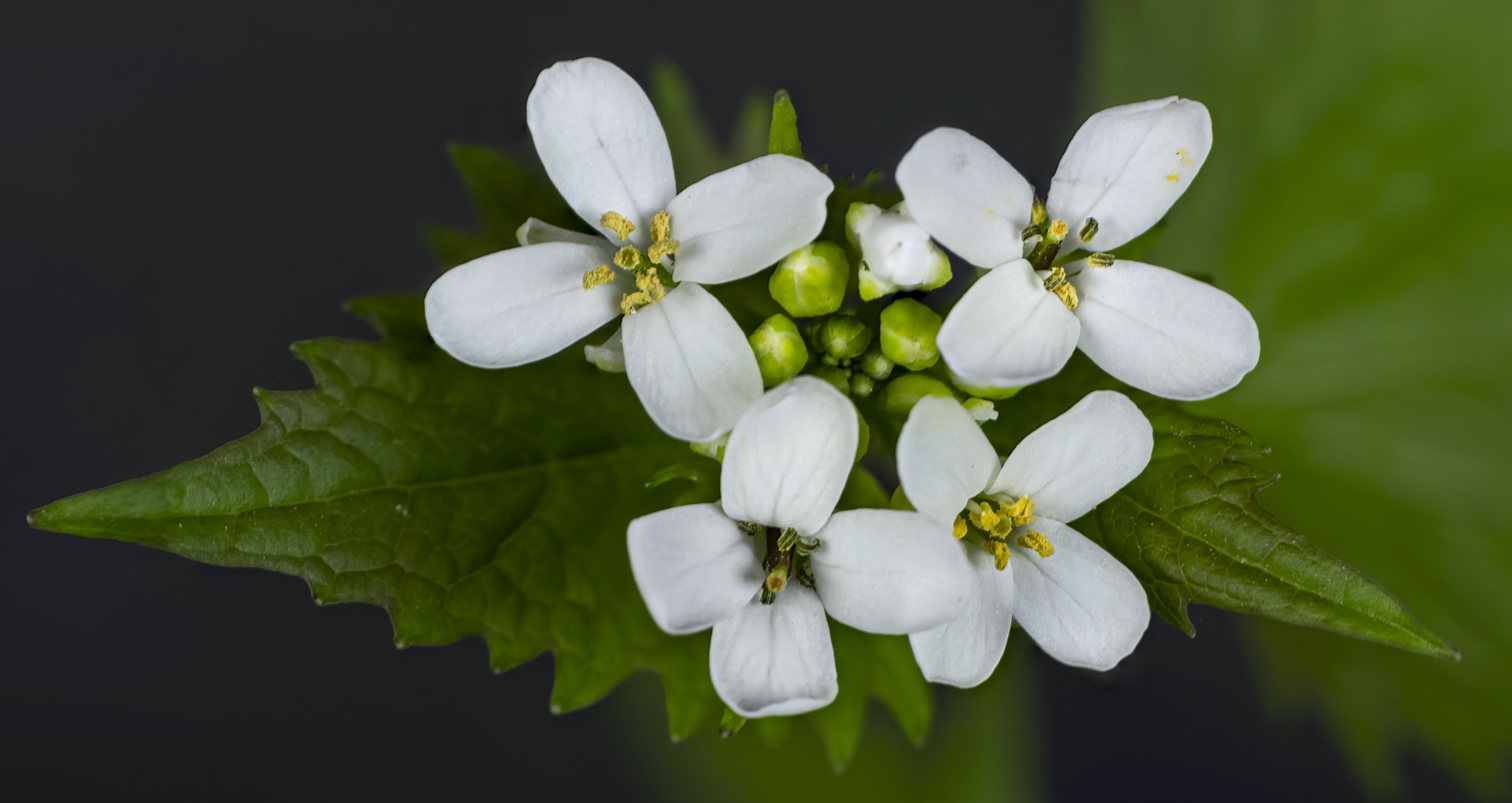
Close-up of garlic mustard flowers

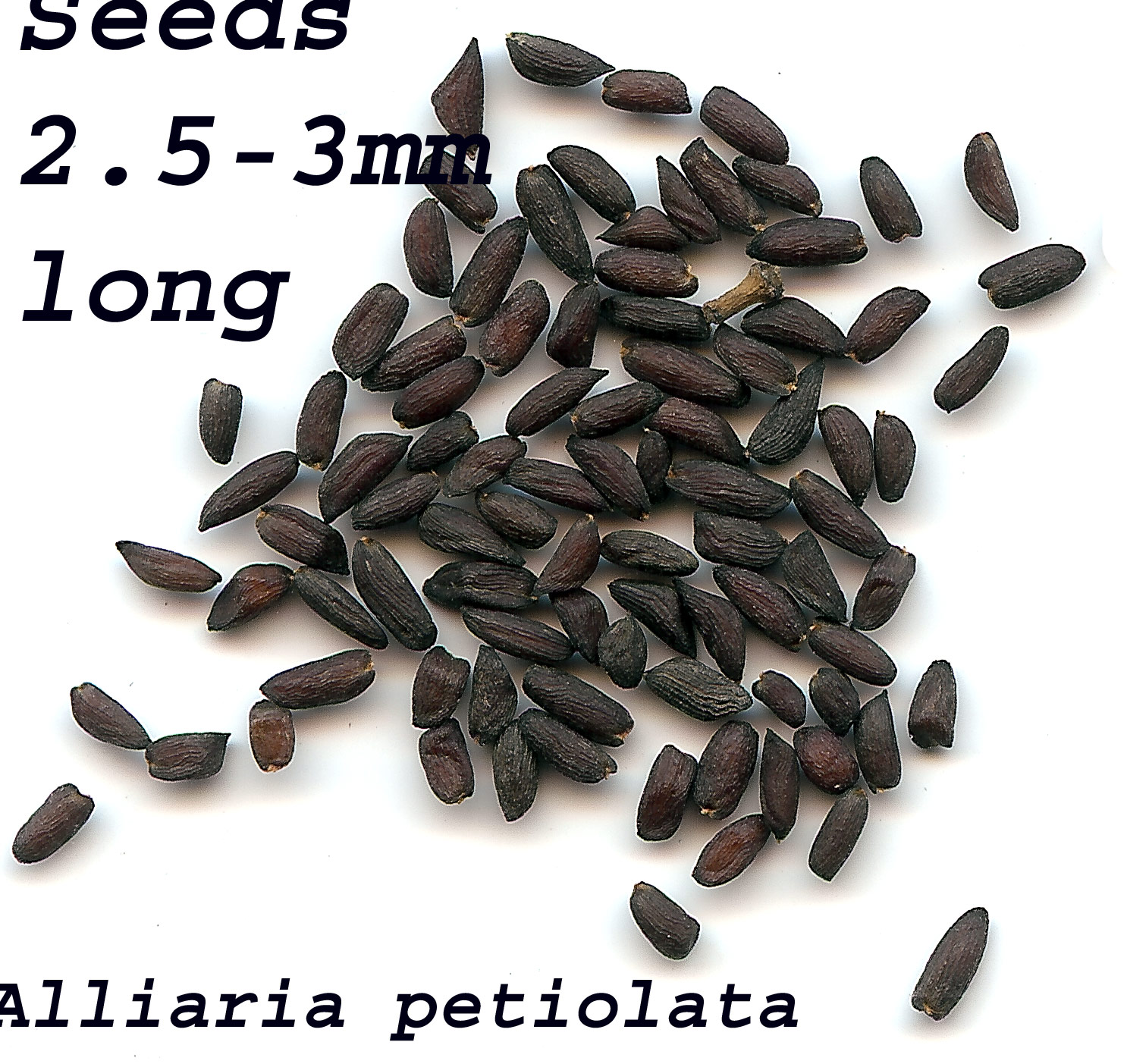
Garlic mustard seeds

Sixty-nine insect herbivores and seven fungi are associated with garlic mustard in Europe. The most important groups of natural enemies associated with garlic mustard were weevils (particularly the genus Ceutorhynchus), leaf beetles, butterflies, and moths, including the larvae of some moth species such as the garden carpet moth. The small white flowers have a rather unpleasant aroma which attracts midges and hoverflies, although the flowers usually pollinate themselves. In June the pale green caterpillar of the orange tip butterfly (Anthocharis cardamines) can be found feeding on the long green seed-pods from which it can hardly be distinguished.

== Invasiveness in North America ==
Garlic mustard was introduced to North America by European settlers in the 1800s for culinary and medicinal purposes. The species was recorded as being in Long Island in 1868. It has since spread all over North America, apart from the far south of the US and some prairie states and Canadian provinces. It is toxic or unpalatable to many native herbivores, as well as to some native Lepidoptera.

The plant is classified as an invasive species in North America. Since being brought to the United States by settlers, it has naturalized and expanded its range to include most of the Northeast and Midwest, as well as south-eastern Canada. It is one of the few invasive herbaceous species able to dominate the understory of North American forests and has thus reduced the biodiversity of many areas.

Of the many natural enemies it has in its native range, several have been tested for use as biological control agents. Five weevil species from the genus Ceutorhynchus and one flea beetle were selected as candidates for preliminary testing in the 1990s. Since that time, those studying the candidates have narrowed the list to two or three weevils. Despite the demonstrated effectiveness of C. scrobicollis and C. constrictus in field testing, the importation and release of biological control agents such as those has been repeatedly blocked by the USDA's TAG (Technical Advisory Group). In particular, C. scrobicollis, which is monophagous and has been specifically studied since 2002, continues to be blocked, despite researchers' many petitions for approval. It is currently estimated that adequate control of garlic mustard can be achieved by the introduction of just two weevils, with C. scrobicollis being the most important of the two. None of the roughly 76 species that control this plant in its native range has been approved for introduction as of 2018 and federal agencies continue to use more traditional forms of control, such as chemical herbicides.

In North America, the plant offers very little wildlife benefits and is toxic to larvae of certain rarer butterfly species (e.g. Pieris oleracea and Pieris virginiensis) that lay eggs on the plants, as it is related to native mustards but creates chemicals that they are not adapted to. They have also been known to inhibit growth of ectomycorrhizal fungi. These fungi play many different roles in a forest ecosystem however inhibition by Alliaria petiolata, may impact tree seedlings in a given environment. Though this plant does have antimicrobial properties, it has an overall weak effect on bacterial communities found in soil, which only occurs under temporally specific conditions.

Native species, including two stem-mining weevils, a stem-mining fly, a leaf-mining fly, a scale insect, two fungi, and aphids (taxonomic identification for all species is pending) were found attacking garlic mustard in North America. However, their attacks were of little consequence to plant performance or reproduction of garlic mustard.

== Toxicity ==
Young first-year garlic mustard plants contain up to 100 ppm cyanide, a level which is toxic to many vertebrates. Once the plant is chopped up, the cyanide gas is eliminated.

== Cultivation and uses ==
Garlic mustard is one of the oldest spices used in Europe. Phytoliths in pottery of the Ertebølle and Funnelneck-Beaker culture in north-eastern Germany and Denmark, dating to 4100–3750 BCE, indicate its use in that era.

In 17th-century Britain, it was recommended as a flavouring for salt fish. It can also be made into a sauce for eating with roast lamb or salad. Early European settlers brought the herb to the New World to use as a garlic-type flavouring. Its traditional medicinal purposes include use as a diuretic. The herb was also planted as a form of erosion control.

Today, the chopped leaves are used for flavouring in salads and sauces such as pesto, and sometimes the flowers and fruit are included as well. The leaves, best when young, taste of both garlic and mustard. The seeds are sometimes used in France to season food. Garlic mustard was once used medicinally as a disinfectant, and was sometimes used to treat wounds.
