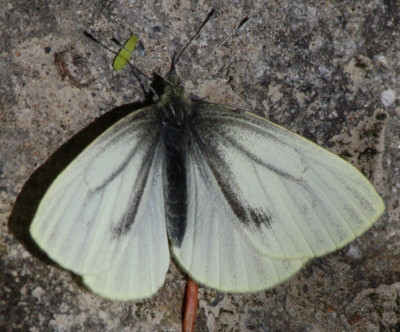
- Mount Baker-Snoqualmie National Forest

Conservation status
- Secure (NatureServe)

Scientific classification
- Kingdom: Animalia
- Phylum: Arthropoda
- Class: Insecta
- Order: Lepidoptera
- Family: Pieridae
- Genus: Pieris
- Species: P. marginalis

Binomial name
- Pieris marginalis Scudder, 1861

= Pieris marginalis =

Margined white

Species of butterfly

Pieris marginalis (margined white) is a butterfly species seen across the coast of Western North America. It is a canopy generalist who feeds on the plant family of Brassiceae. The species is unique as it has been seen near and away from disturbed habitat; indicating an adaptation for habitat generalization.

== Description ==
The summer form is purely white, while the spring form has black-tipped upper forewing. The underside of hindwing and the apex of forewing have veins edged with yellow-green or gray-green. The wingspan ranges from 1 1/2 to 2 1/4 inches (3.8 to 5.7 centimeters).
