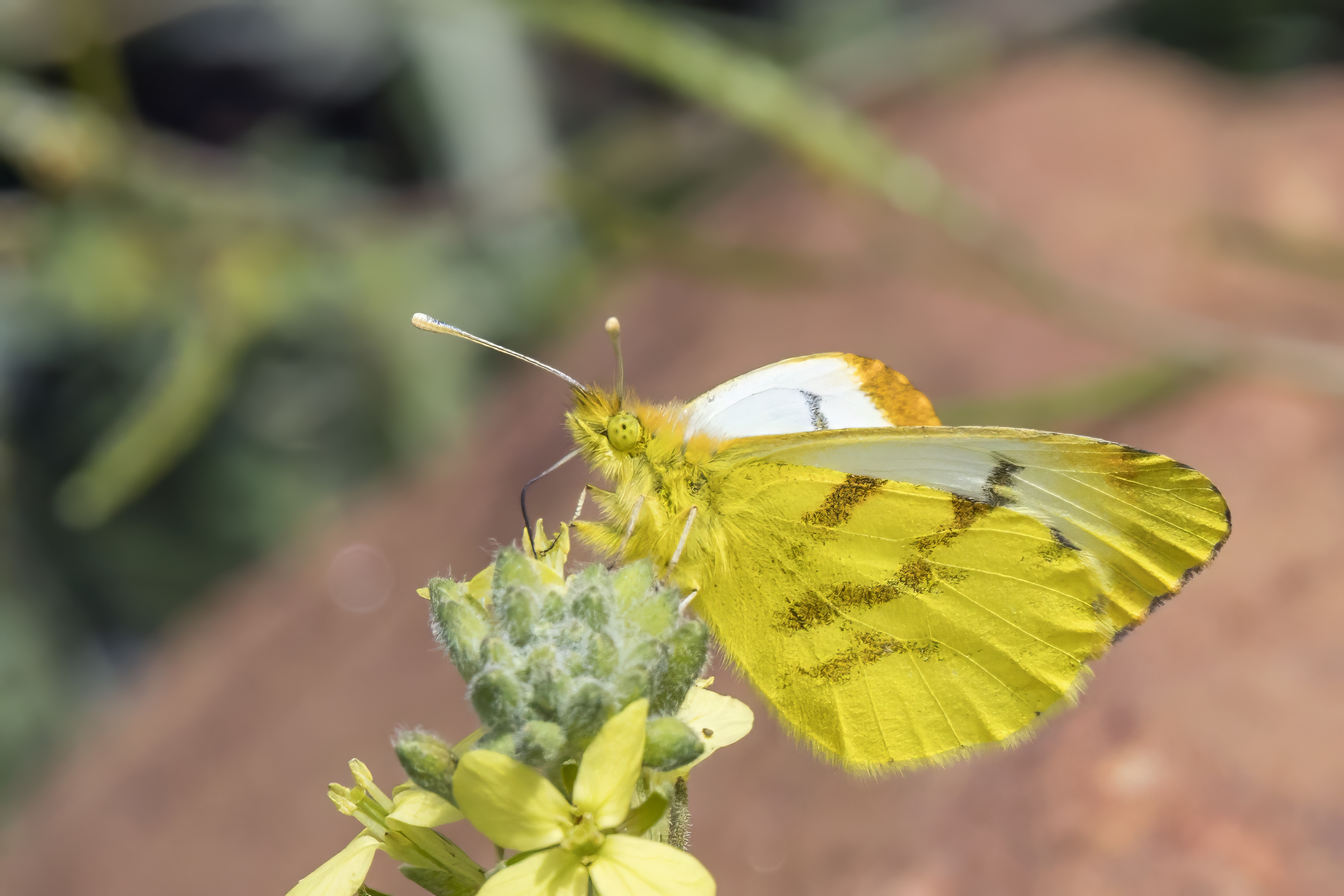
- female A. b. belia, Tunisia

Conservation status
- Least Concern (IUCN 3.1)

Scientific classification
- Kingdom: Animalia
- Phylum: Arthropoda
- Clade: Pancrustacea
- Class: Insecta
- Order: Lepidoptera
- Family: Pieridae
- Genus: Anthocharis
- Species: A. belia

Binomial name
- Anthocharis belia (Linnaeus, 1767)

= Anthocharis belia =

Moroccan orange tip

Species of butterfly

Anthocharis belia, the Moroccan orange tip, is a butterfly of the family Pieridae. It is found in northwestern Africa (specifically Morocco, Algeria and Tunisia). The length of the forewings is 18–20 millimetres (0.7–0.8 in).

== Description in Seitz ==
A. eupheno L. (synonym of Anthocharis belia) from North Africa, is above very similar to Anthocharis damone but the orange patch is smaller and proximally more strongly edged with dark, the black median spot disappearing in the dark edge of the orange spot; however, the underside of the hindwing lighter yellow and differently marked. The female is without the orange patch, having reddish yellow only in the apical area. — androgyne Leech, from Morocco, differs only in the female in the stronger development of the reddish yellow apical spot. Larva green, with yellow and black dorsal markings, very similar to that of A. euphenoides, on Biscutella (Spuler).

Anthocharis belia belia ♀

Anthocharis belia belia ♀ △
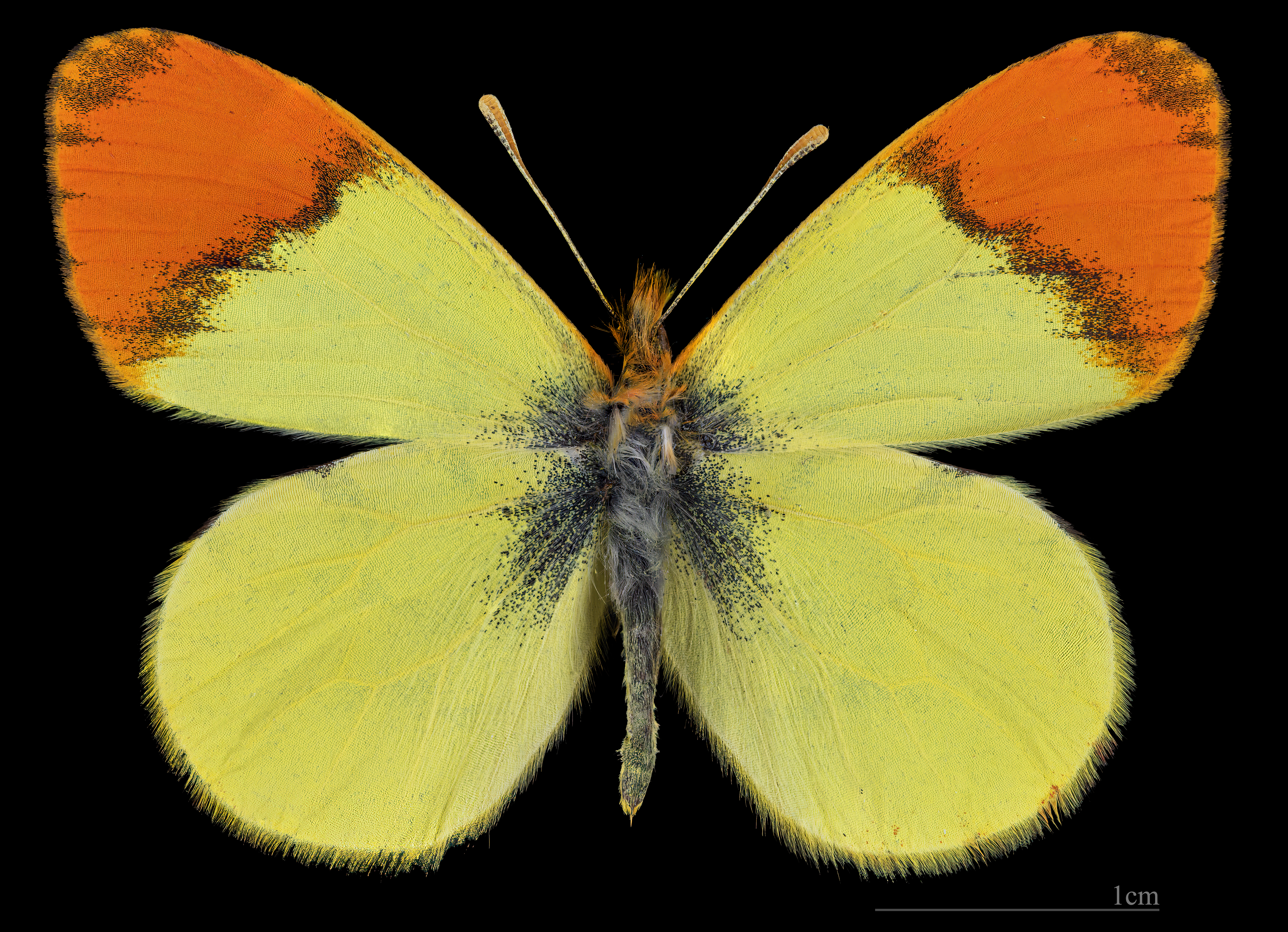
Anthocharis belia androgyne ♂

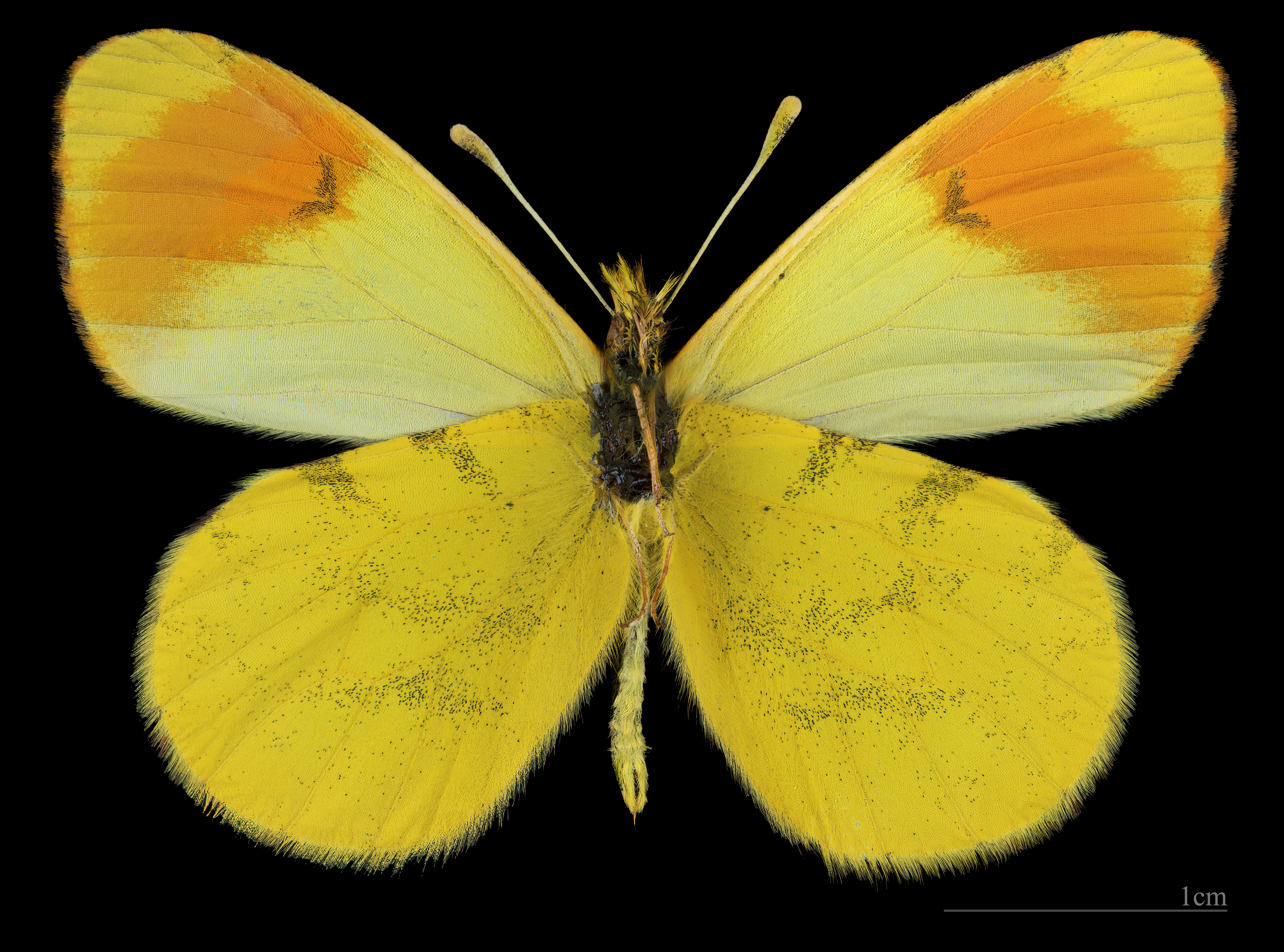
Anthocharis belia androgyne ♂ △

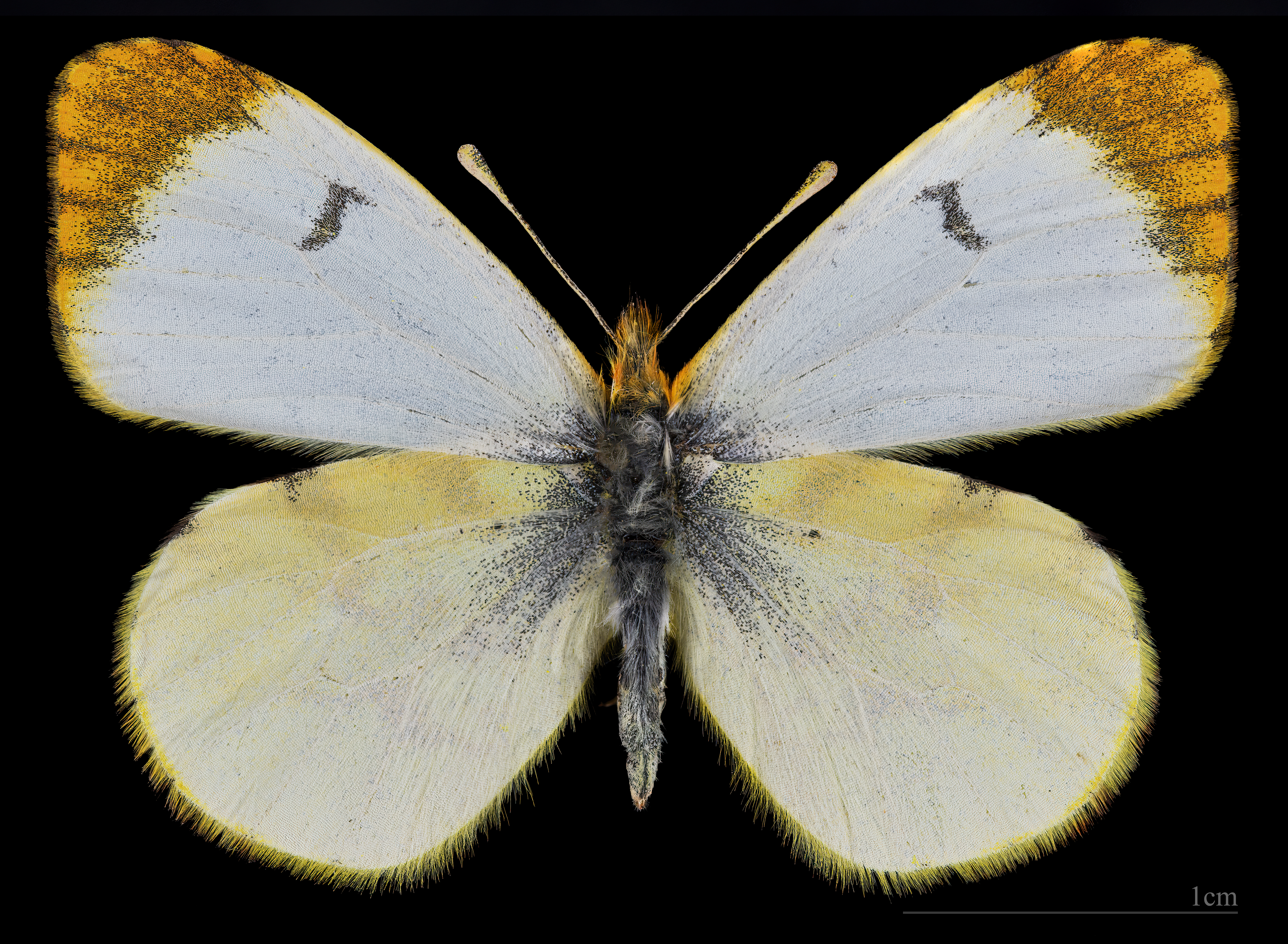
Anthocharis belia androgyne ♀

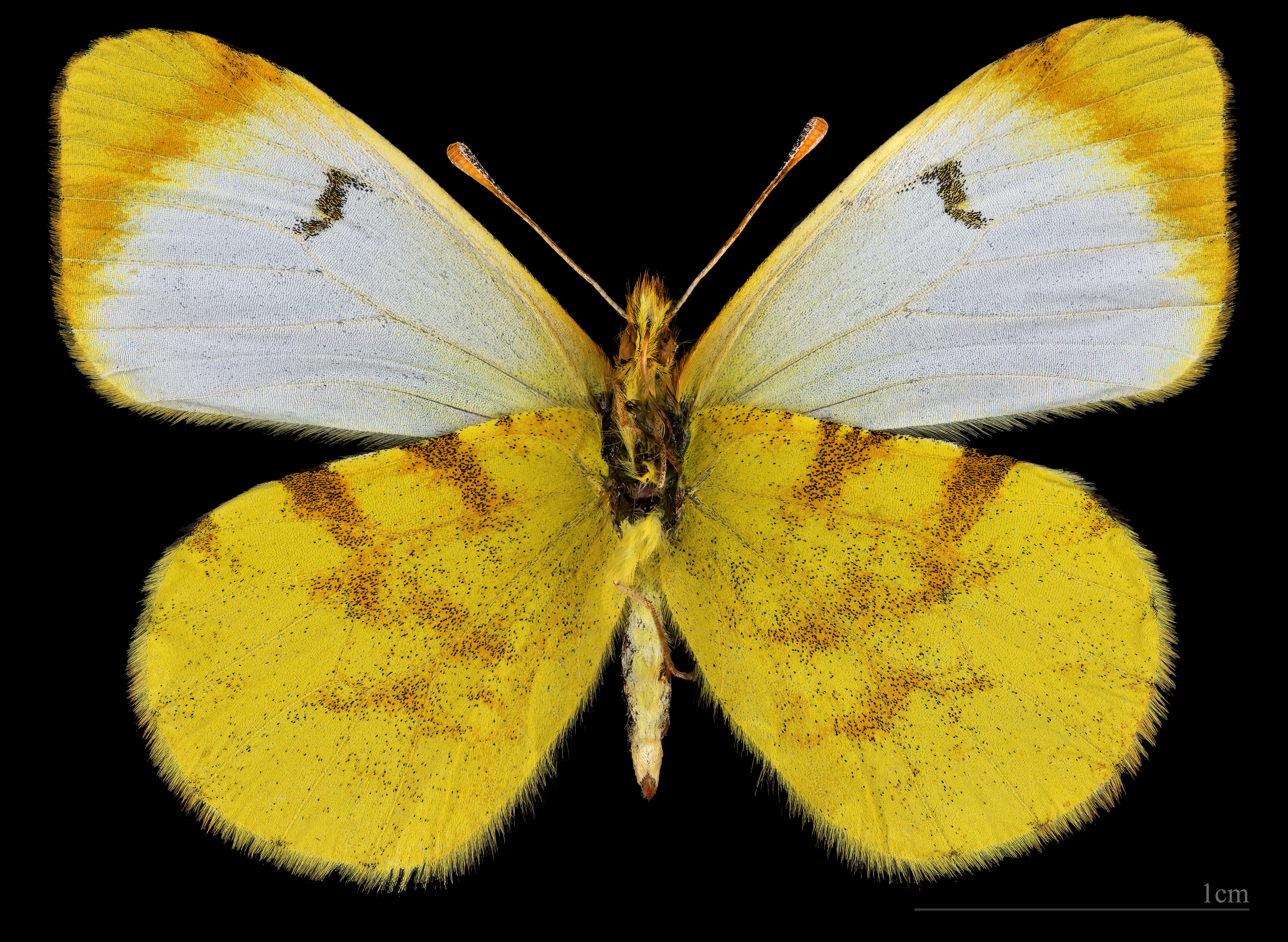
Anthocharis belia androgyne ♀ △

== Biology ==
The larvae feed on Biscutella laevigata and Sisymbrium officinale in the wild, and have been reared on Alyssum in captivity. In Morocco, subspecies A.b. androgyne (with male-like females) is one of several coexisting Euchloine species (including species of the genera Euchloe, Elphinstonia and Zegris). All of these species have larvae that may be cannibalistic. These species do not segregate by use of different host plants, but show some separation by use of different habitats. A. belia is most associated with relatively stable environments and the use of longer-lived hosts

== Gallery ==
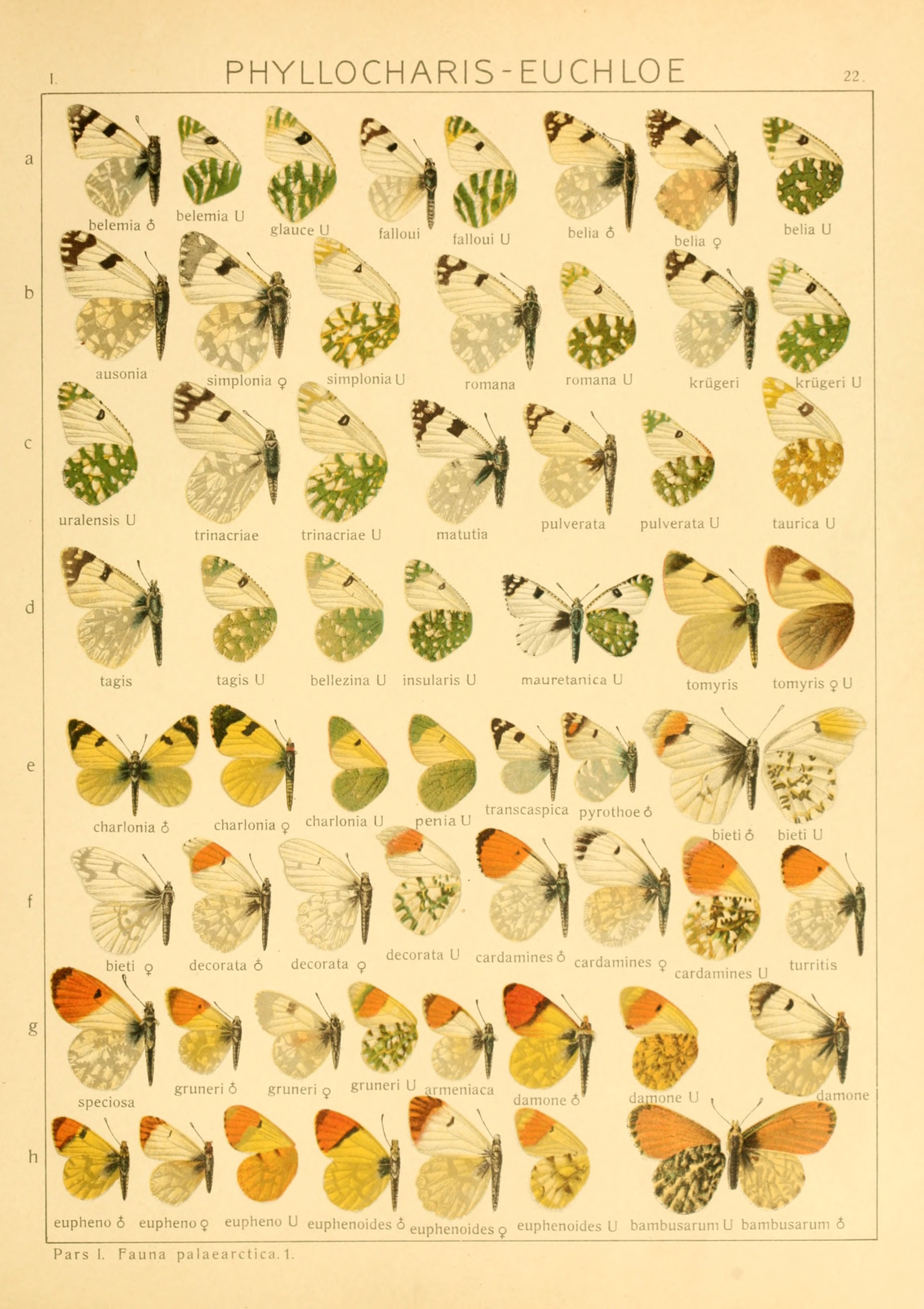
Anthocharis in Seitz A. eupheno L. is a synonym of Anthocharis belia
