= Mathania =

Mathania may refer to:

- Mathania, Jodhpur, a village in Rajasthan, India
- Mathania (butterfly), a genus of butterflies
