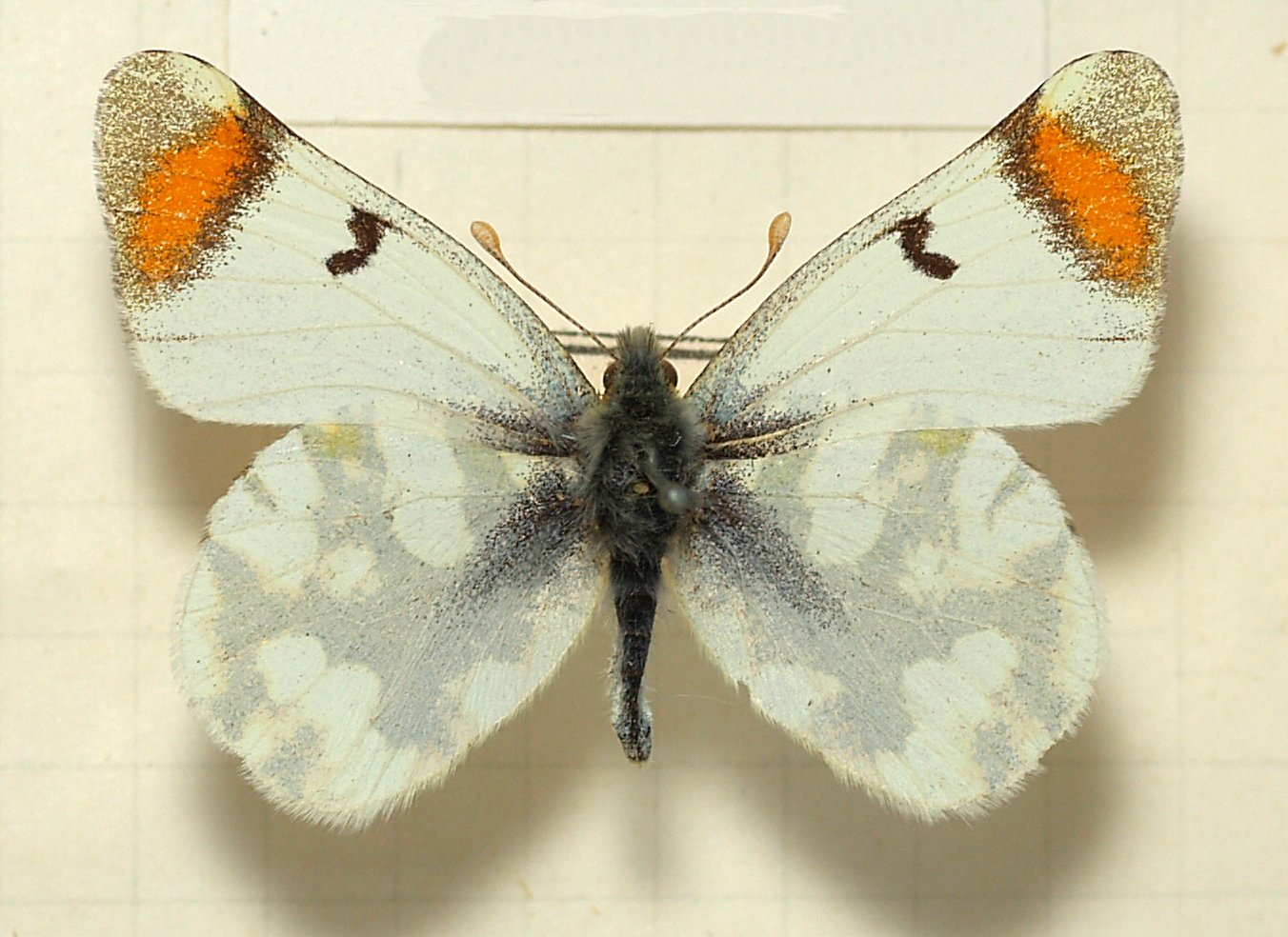

Scientific classification
- Domain: Eukaryota
- Kingdom: Animalia
- Phylum: Arthropoda
- Class: Insecta
- Order: Lepidoptera
- Family: Pieridae
- Genus: Zegris
- Species: Z. eupheme

Binomial name
- Zegris eupheme (Esper, 1805)

Subspecies
- Several, see text

Synonyms
- Papilio eupheme Esper, [1804]; Zegris eupheme menestho Ménétriés, 1832; Zegris eupheme meridionalis Lederer, 1852

= Sooty orange tip =

Species of butterfly

The sooty orange tip (Zegris eupheme) is a Palearctic Pieridae butterfly that has a range that extends through southern Europe, southwest Europe, northern Africa, East Kazakhstan and Asia Minor. Global warming currently seems to be extending its range to the north. The habitat consists of open flowery grasslands amongst hills.

The wingspan is 46–50 mm (1.8–2.0 in). Adults are on wing from mid-March to mid-June in one generation per year.

The larvae feed on Sinapis incana, Raphanus, Sisymbrium polymorphum and Camelina laxa.

In Morocco, the species is particularly associated with woad (Isatis tinctoria), and is found at mid and high elevations in the Middle and High Atlas Mountains. Larvae are often found on the same individual host plant as caterpillars of Euchloe, Pieris rapae and Pieris brassicae. Compared to these other pierines, Z. eupheme is associated with very stable environments.

== Description in Seitz ==
Zegris eupheme from south-eastern Russia, Armenia and the Alatau, is above white with dark apex to the forewing, bearing an orange-red spot, the black median spot of the forewing being halfmoon shaped. The orange spot is usually smaller in the female, being sometimes absent. The underside white, the forewing having a yellow apex and a black median spot, the hindwing being greenish yellow, with white spots. Specimens in which these spots are prevalent belong to ab. tschudica H.-Sch. [synonym of Z. e. erothoe] — menestho Mén. from Asia Minor and Western Kurdistan has the underside of the hindwing more yellow, being also somewhat larger. — meridionalis Led. [stat. nov. Zegris meridionalis meridionalis Lederer, 1852] from central and southern Spain, is still larger, the almost uniformly yellow underside of the hindwing having grey-greenish markings. Larva thick, cylindrical, densely hairy. Pupa stout, with in a dense cocoon, in which one finds, however, still a remnant of the thread characteristic for pupae of Pierids.

== Subspecies ==
- Z. e. eupheme Esper, 1804 (Southern Russia)
- Z. e. dyala Peile, 1921 (Iran)
- Z. e. tigris Riley, 1921 (Iran)
- Z. e. maroccana Bernardi, 1950 (Morocco, Spain) = Zegris meridionalis marocana Bernardi, 1950 comb. nov. by Back 2012: 80.
- Z. e. larseni Pittaway, 1986 (Saudi Arabia)
- Z. e. menestho (Ménétriés, 1832) Asia Minor and Western Kurdistan
- Z. e. uarda Hemming, 1929
- Z. e. sulphurea O. Bang-Haas, 1927
- Z. e. harandi Back, Karbalaye, Leestmans & Hofmann, 2005
- Z. e. erothoe (Eversmann, [1832])

== Habitat ==
In Armenia, the species inhabits dry grasslands including semi-deserts, and arid steppes, as well as juniper woodlands, and tragacanth steppe areas, which are replacing forest on the eroded slopes. Elevation range occupied by the species is from 400 to 2,000 m (1,300 to 6,600 ft) above sea level.
