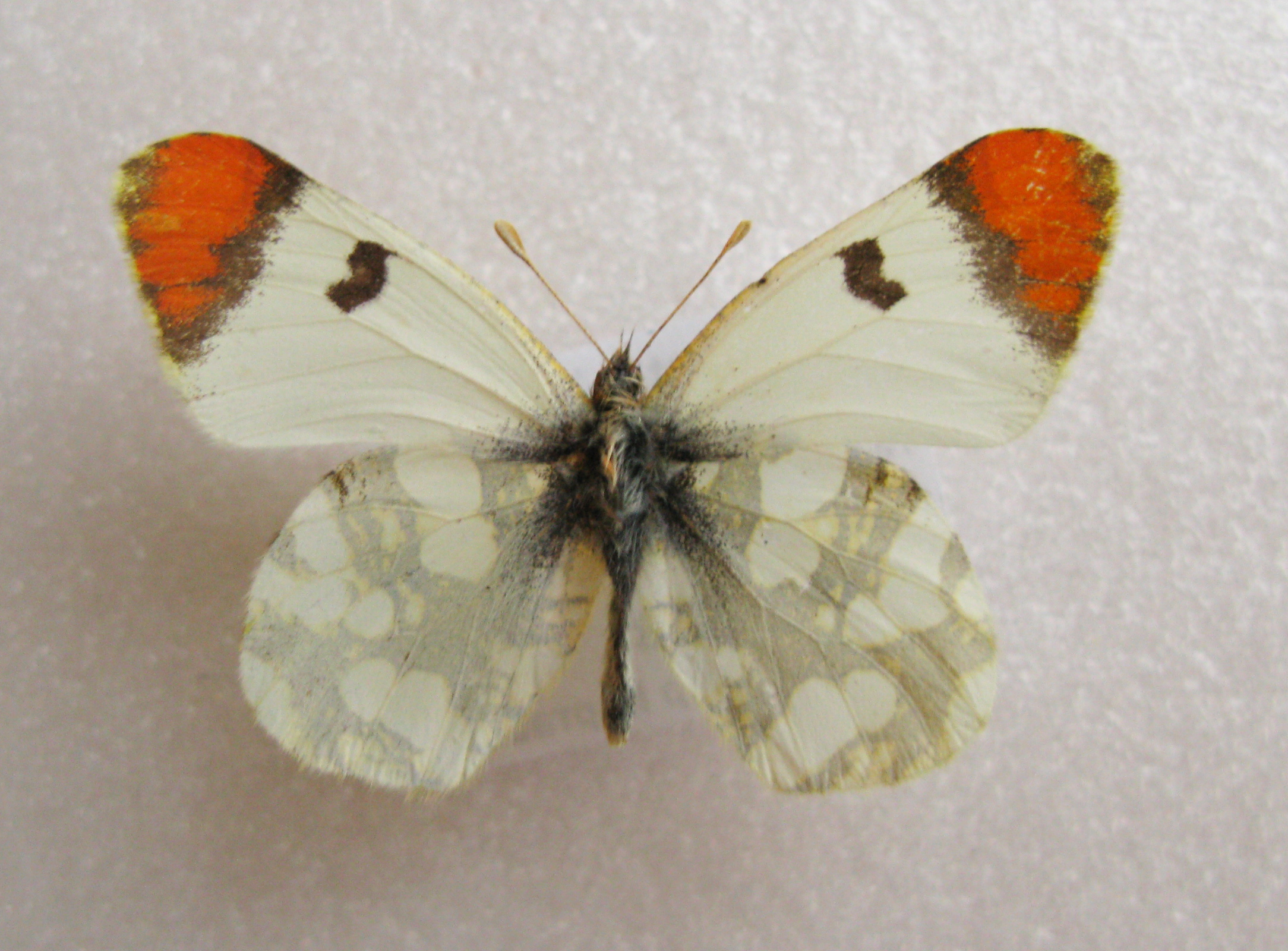
- Zegris fausti

Scientific classification
- Kingdom: Animalia
- Phylum: Arthropoda
- Clade: Pancrustacea
- Class: Insecta
- Order: Lepidoptera
- Family: Pieridae
- Tribe: Anthocharini
- Genus: Zegris; Boisduval, 1836

Synonyms
- Microzegris Alphéraky, 1913

= Zegris (butterfly) =

Butterfly genus in family Pieridae

Zegris is a Palearctic genus of butterflies in the family Pieridae. This genus was erected by Jean Baptiste Boisduval in 1836. It is characterized by the very strongly clubbed antennae and the bushy palpi, but especially by the shape of the larva and pupa and the manner of pupation.

== Species ==
- Zegris eupheme (Esper, 1804)
- Zegris fausti Christoph, 1877 Turkestan, Iran, Iraq, Afghanistan, Pakistan
- Zegris pyrothoe (Eversmann, 1832) southwestern Siberia, Turan, Kazakhstan, western China
- Zegris zhungelensis Huang & Murayama, 1992 Xinjiang
- Zegris meridionalis Lederer, 1852 central and southern Spain
