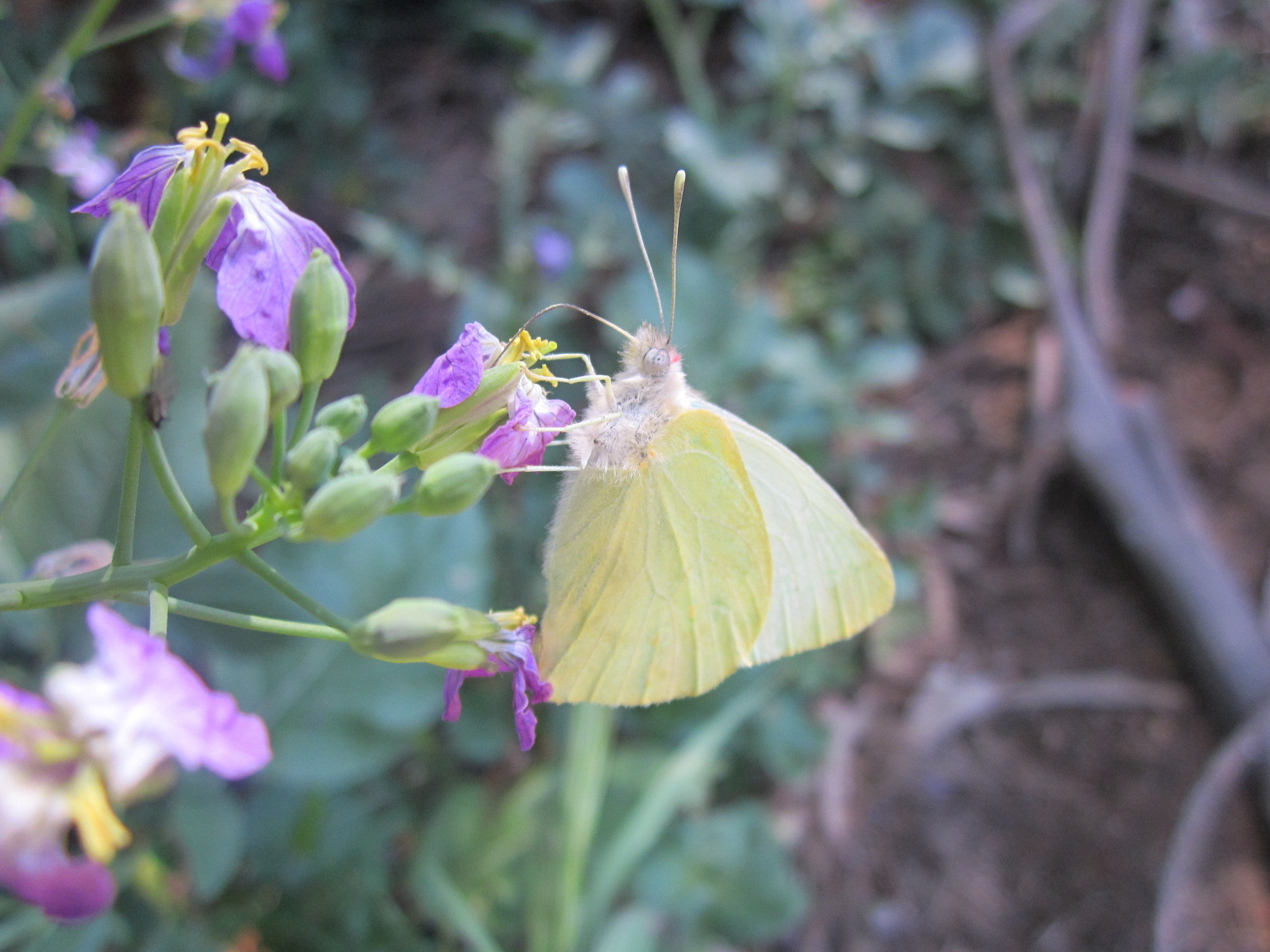
- Mathania leucothea

Scientific classification
- Kingdom: Animalia
- Phylum: Arthropoda
- Clade: Pancrustacea
- Class: Insecta
- Order: Lepidoptera
- Family: Pieridae
- Tribe: Anthocharini
- Genus: Mathania; Oberthür, 1890

= Mathania (butterfly) =

Butterfly genus in family Pieridae

Mathania is a genus of butterflies in the family Pieridae. The genus was described by Oberthür in 1890.

The Global Lepidoptera Names Index gives this name as a synonym of Hesperocharis C. Felder, 1862.

== Species ==
- Mathania agasicles (Hewitson, 1874)
- Mathania aureomaculata (Dognin, 1888)
- Mathania carrizoi Giacomelli, 1914
- Mathania leucothea (Molina, 1782)
