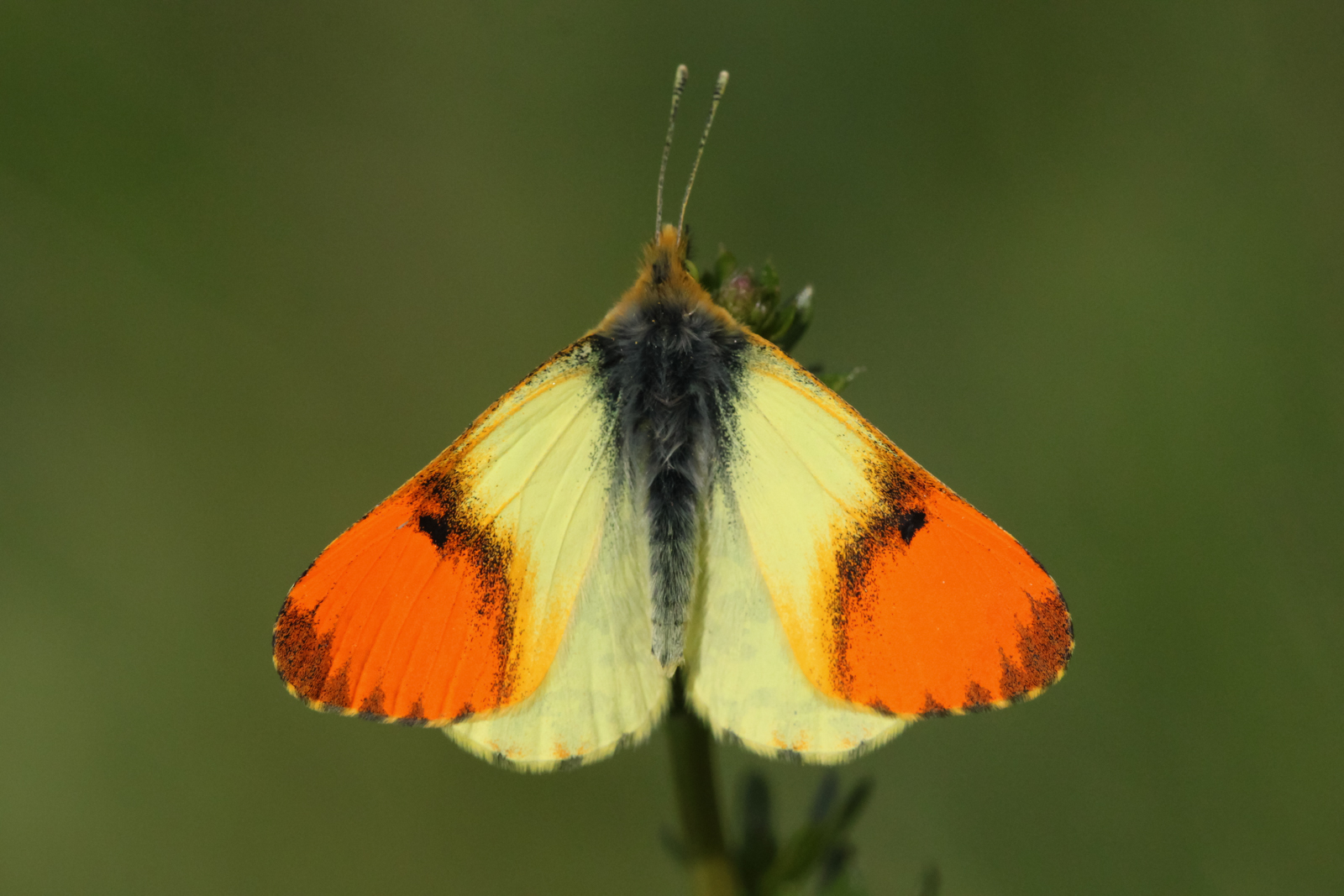
- Eastern orange tip

Scientific classification
- Kingdom: Animalia
- Phylum: Arthropoda
- Class: Insecta
- Order: Lepidoptera
- Family: Pieridae
- Genus: Anthocharis
- Species: A. damone

Binomial name
- Anthocharis damone (Boisduval, 1836)

= Anthocharis damone =

Eastern orange tip

Species of butterfly

Anthocharis damone, the eastern orange tip, is a butterfly in the subfamily Pierinae, found in southern Europe and into Asia Minor.

== Description in Seitz ==
A. damone Boisd. from South Italy, Sicily, the southern Balcan, Asia Minor and Syria, is sexually dimorphic. The male is lemon-yellow above and below, with a narrowly black apex, large deep orange-red apical patch, which is more or less dark-edged proximally, and with a large black median spot to the forewing: the underside of the hindwing deeper yellow, with grey-greenish markings. The female is white above and on the underside of the forewing, and has a broader blackish apex to the upperside of the forewing. — pallida form. nov. is the name for the form occurring in Mesopotamia; male above somewhat paler yellow, the dark apex of the forewing is strongly mixed with red, the orange patch is less fiery, being dark-edged only in the cell, the black median spot is smaller, less prominent, the ground-colour of the hindwing beneath is lighter yellow, and the dark markings are more united to isolated patches. In the female the black median spot of the forewing is smaller on both sides and less sharply marked, the underside of the hindwing being lighter yellow.

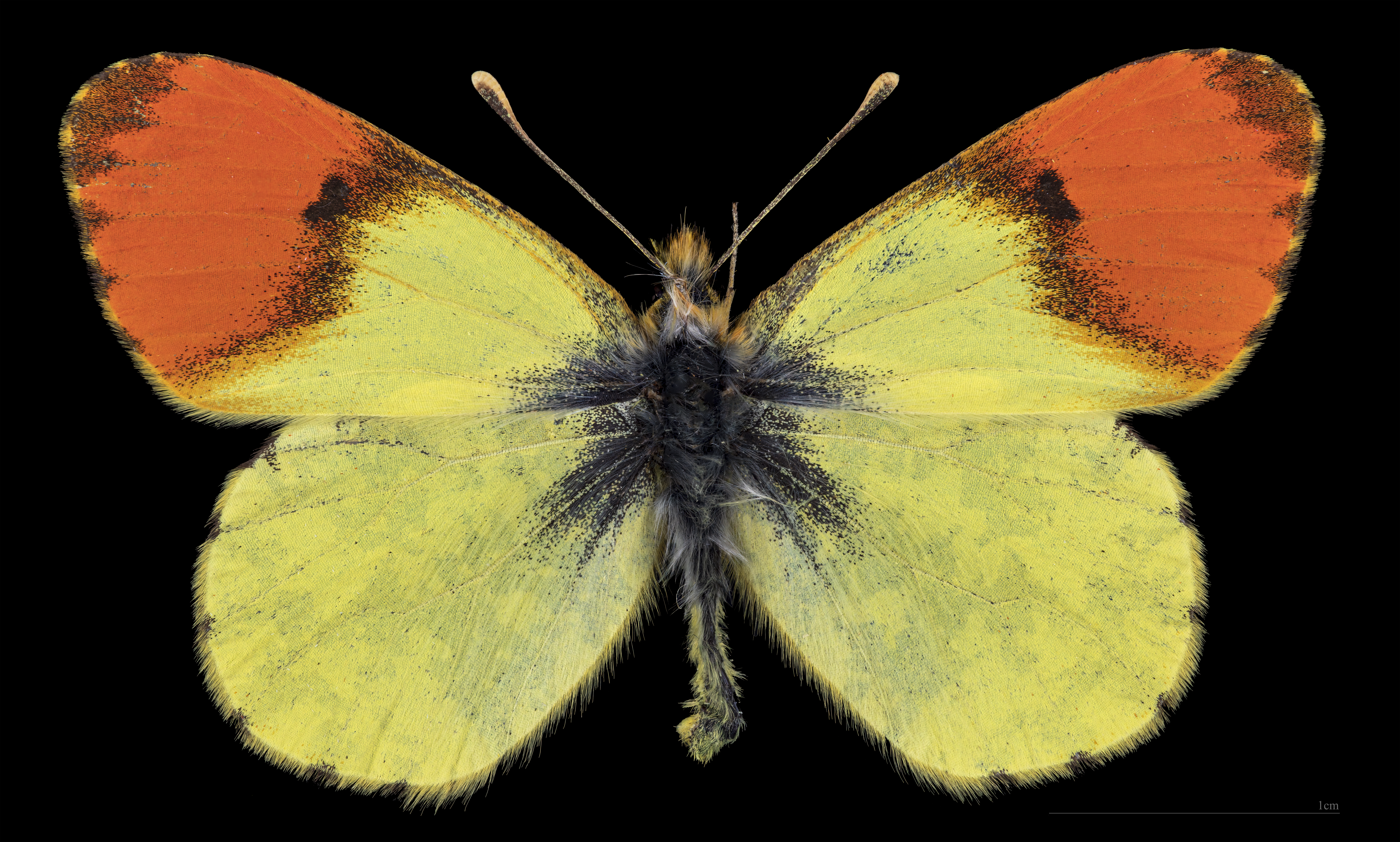
Anthocharis damone ♂

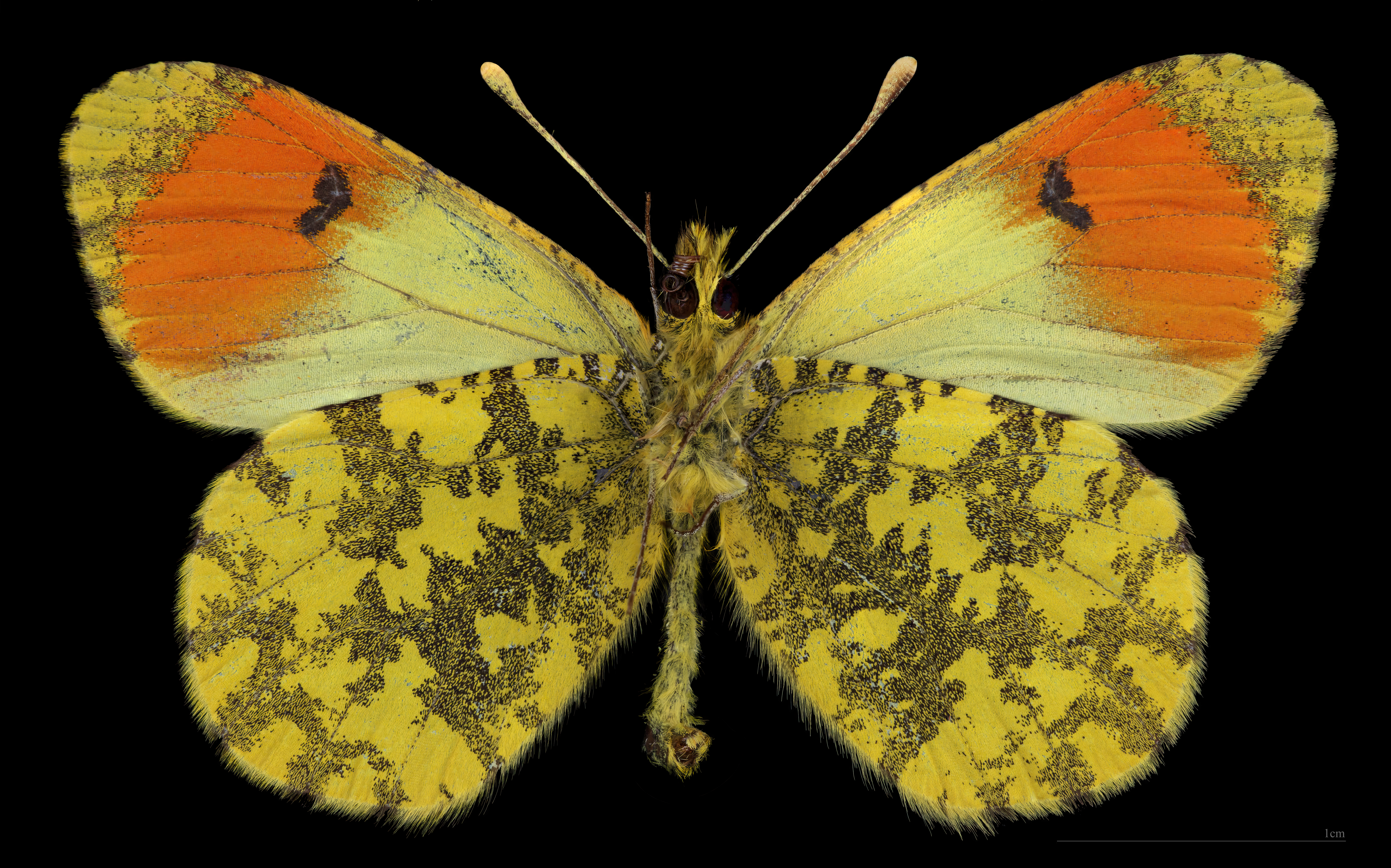
Anthocharis damone ♂ △

== Habitat ==
In Armenia A. damone inhabits mountain steppes, but also occurs in juniper woodlands, occupying elevation range from 1200 to 2200 m a.s.l.

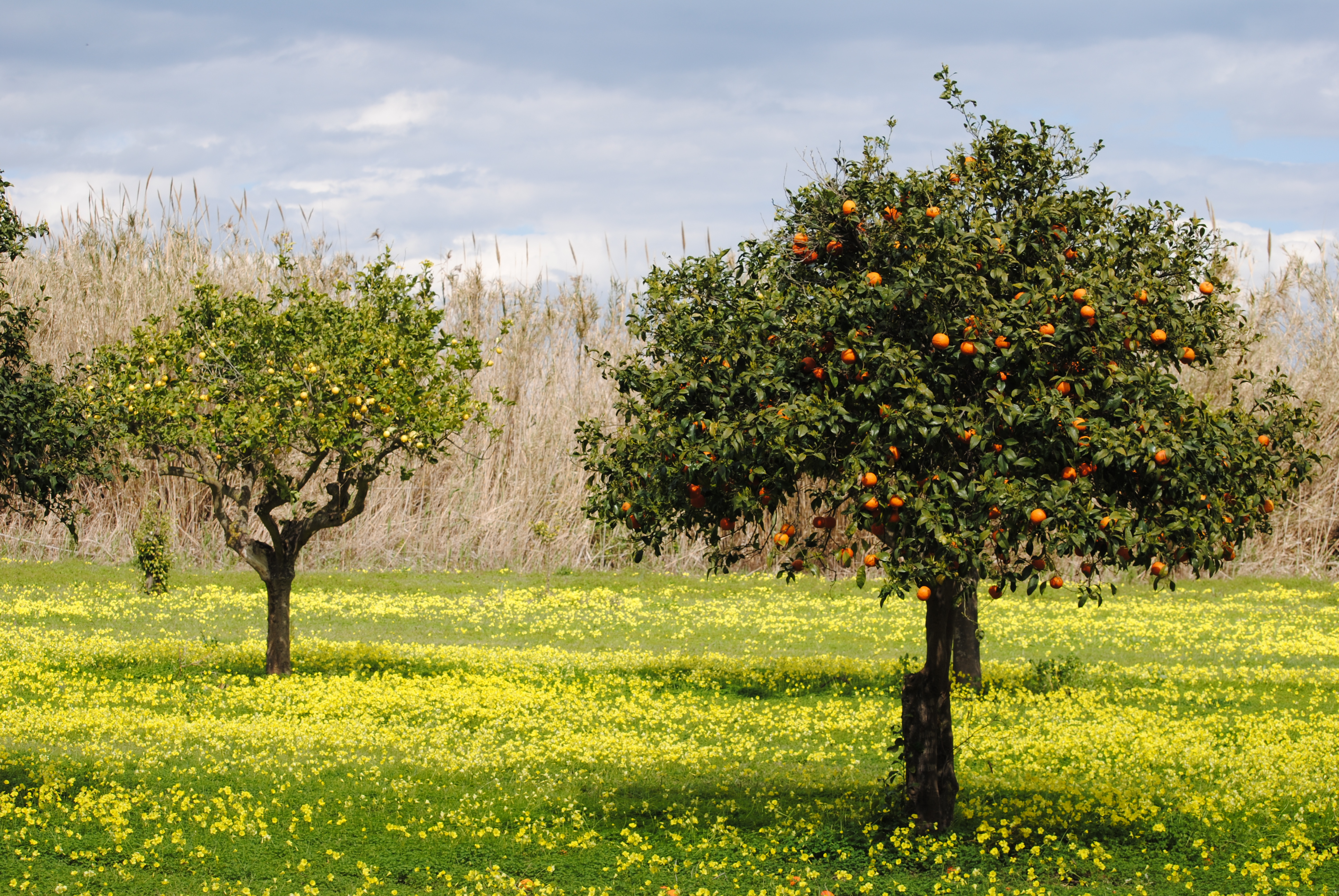
Habitat in Sicily
