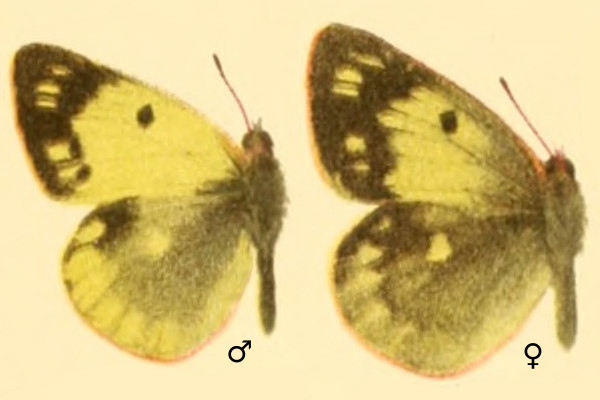

Scientific classification
- Kingdom: Animalia
- Phylum: Arthropoda
- Class: Insecta
- Order: Lepidoptera
- Family: Pieridae
- Genus: Colias
- Species: C. montium

Binomial name
- Colias montium Oberthür, 1886

= Colias montium =

Species of butterfly

Colias montium is a butterfly in the family Pieridae. It is found in the eastern Palearctic realm (Tibet and China).

== Description ==
The male is yellow above, the inner portion of the forewing not being darkened and the yellow submarginal spots being rather sharply defined. The underside, especially of the forewing, is more yellow, the hindwing, moreover bearing, yolk-coloured subapical spots and posteriorly black submarginal ones. The female is lighter above, the hindwing is darker proximally, and the light distal margin contrasts with the disc.

== Subspecies ==
- C. m. montium Tibet, Sichuan
- C. m. viridis O. Bang-Haas, 1915 Qinghai
- C. m. longto Evans, 1924 S. Tibet
- C. m. fasciata Kocman, 1999 Qinghai

== Taxonomy ==
Accepted as a species by Josef Grieshuber & Gerardo Lamas
