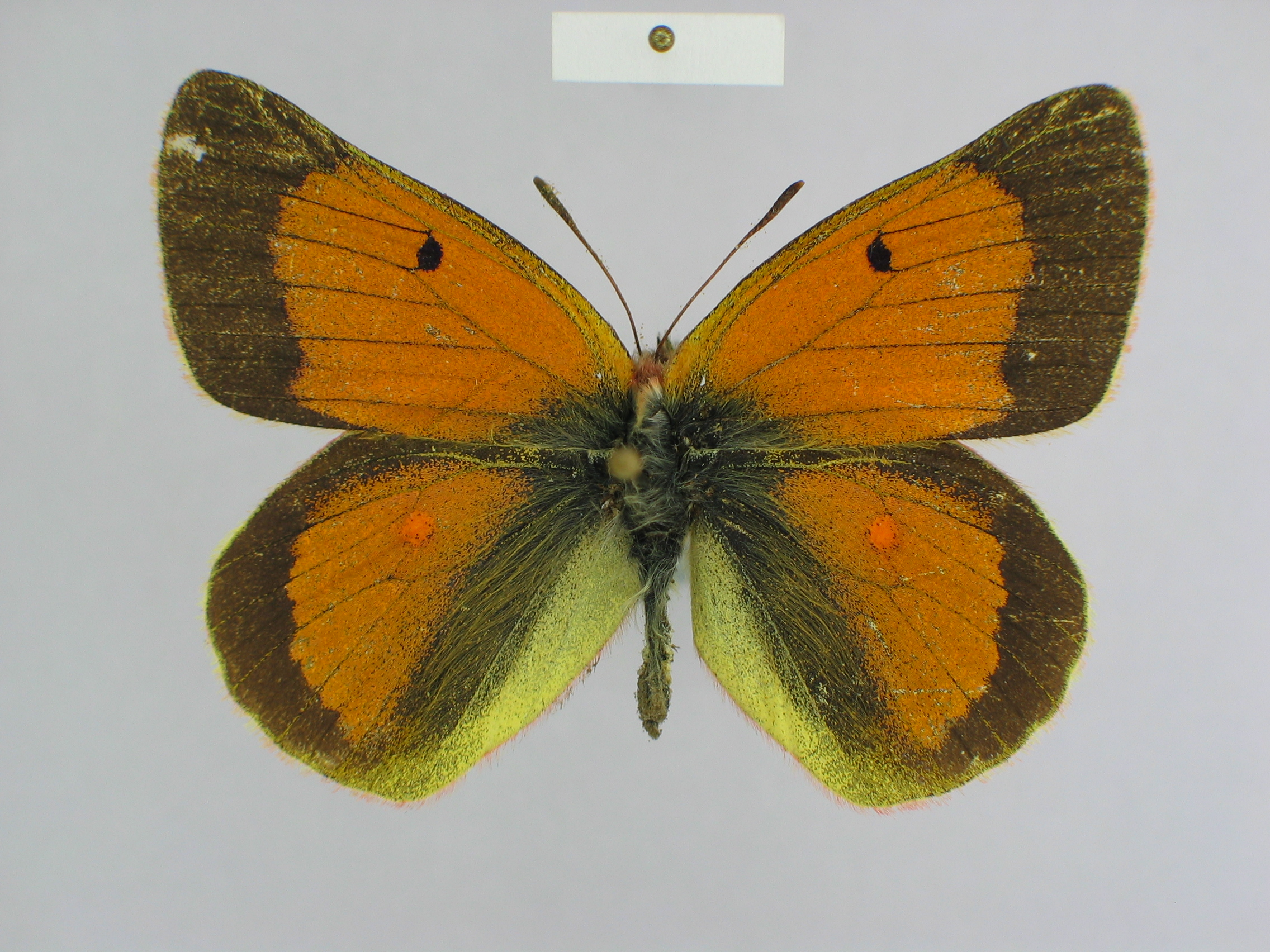
- dorsal side of a male colias adelaidae

Scientific classification
- Kingdom: Animalia
- Phylum: Arthropoda
- Class: Insecta
- Order: Lepidoptera
- Family: Pieridae
- Genus: Colias
- Species: C. adelaidae

Binomial name
- Colias adelaidae Verhulst, 1991

= Colias adelaidae =

Species of butterfly

Colias adelaidae is a butterfly in the family Pieridae. It is found in the eastern Palearctic realm (China and Tibet).

== Subspecies ==
- C. a. adelaidae
- C. a. karmalana Grieshuber, 1999

== Taxonomy ==
Accepted as a species by Josef Grieshuber & Gerardo Lamas
