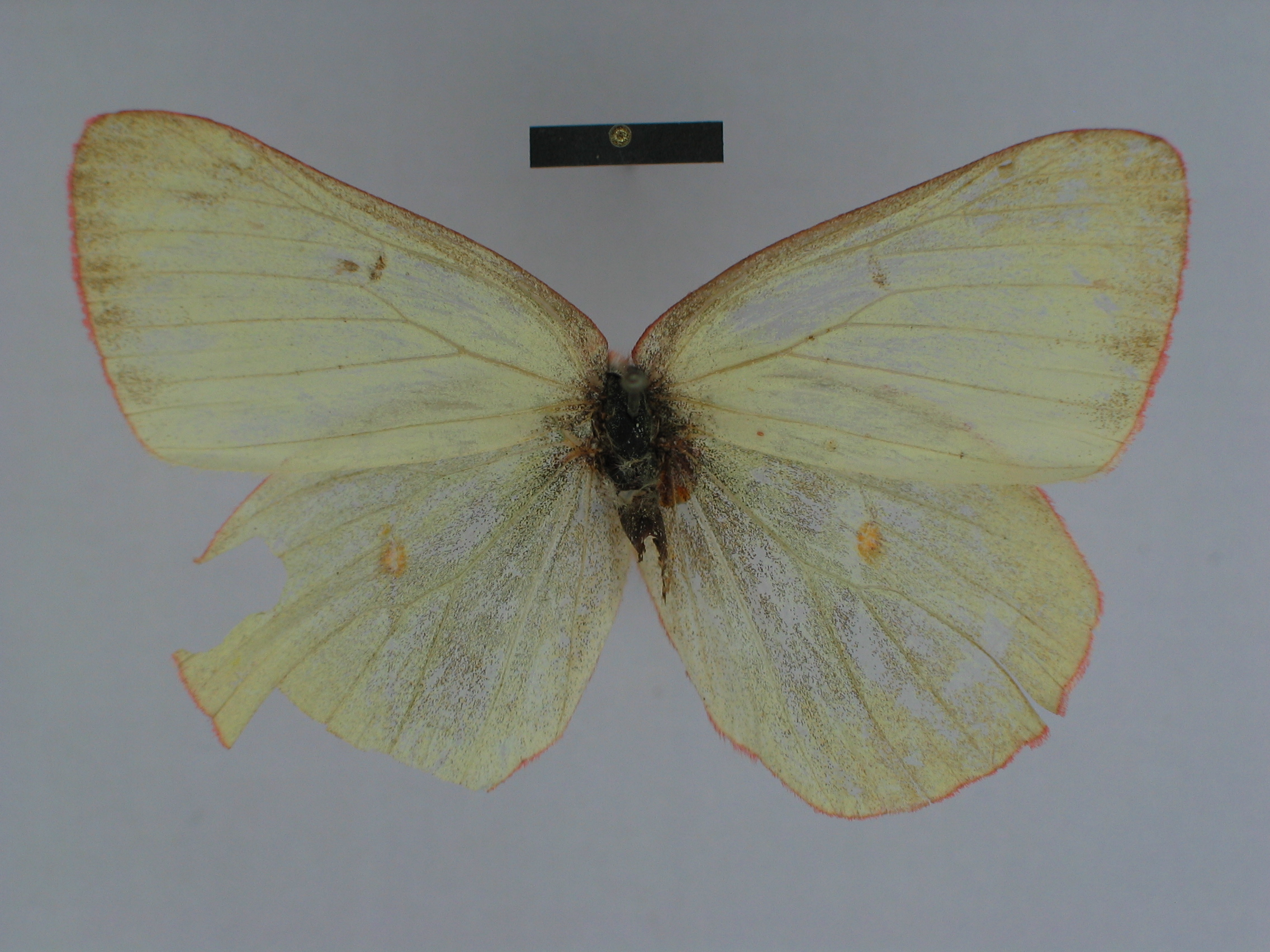

Conservation status
- Secure (NatureServe)

Scientific classification
- Kingdom: Animalia
- Phylum: Arthropoda
- Clade: Pancrustacea
- Class: Insecta
- Order: Lepidoptera
- Family: Pieridae
- Genus: Colias
- Species: C. gigantea

Binomial name
- Colias gigantea Strecker, 1900

= Colias gigantea =

Species of butterfly

Colias gigantea, the giant sulphur or giant northern sulfur, is a butterfly in the family Pieridae found in North America. Its range includes Alaska across Canada to the east coast and Wyoming, Montana, and Oregon.

Flight period is from June until early August. It inhabits tundra and willow bogs.

Wingspan is from 37 to 55 millimetres (1.5 to 2.2 in).

Larvae feed on Salix spp. Adults feed on flower nectar.

== Subspecies ==
Listed alphabetically.

- C. g. gigantea (Alaska, Alberta, British Columbia, Manitoba, Saskatchewan, Ontario, Yukon, Northwest Territories)
- C. g. harroweri Klots, 1940 (Wyoming, Montana, Oregon)
- C. g. mayi F. & R. Chermock, 1940
