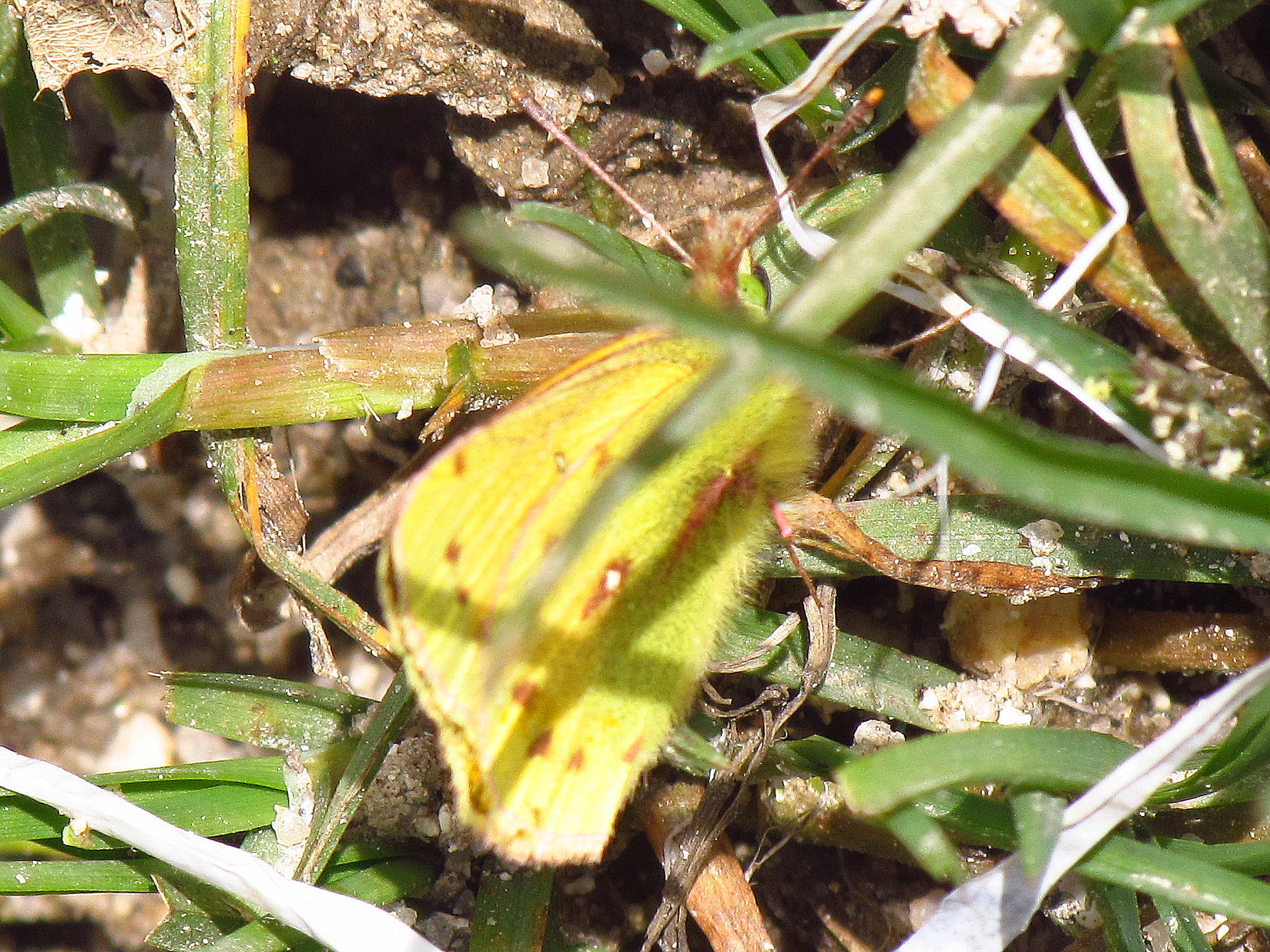

Scientific classification
- Kingdom: Animalia
- Phylum: Arthropoda
- Class: Insecta
- Order: Lepidoptera
- Family: Pieridae
- Genus: Colias
- Species: C. euxanthe

Binomial name
- Colias euxanthe C. & R. Felder, 1865

Synonyms
- Scalidoneura hermina Butler, 1871; Colias lesbia f. puna Fruhstorfer, 1907; Colias flaveola ab. saturata Röber, 1909; Colias flaveola ab. alba Röber, 1909; Colias euxanthe ab. dimorpha Hemming, 1925; Colias euxanthe euxanthe f. gynomorpha Berger, 1981; Colias euxanthe euxanthe f. lutea Berger, 1981; Colias euxanthe coeneni Berger, 1983

= Colias euxanthe =

Puna clouded sulphur

Species of butterfly

Colias euxanthe, the Puna clouded sulphur, is a butterfly in the family Pieridae. It is found in the Tropical Andes subregion of the Neotropical realm (Peru, Bolivia and Ecuador).

== Subspecies ==
- C. e. euxanthe – [Peru]
- C. e. alticola Godman & Salvin, 1891 – [Ecuador]
- C. e. hermina (Butler, 1871) – [Peru, Bolivia]
- C. e. stuebeli Reissinger, 1972 – [Peru]

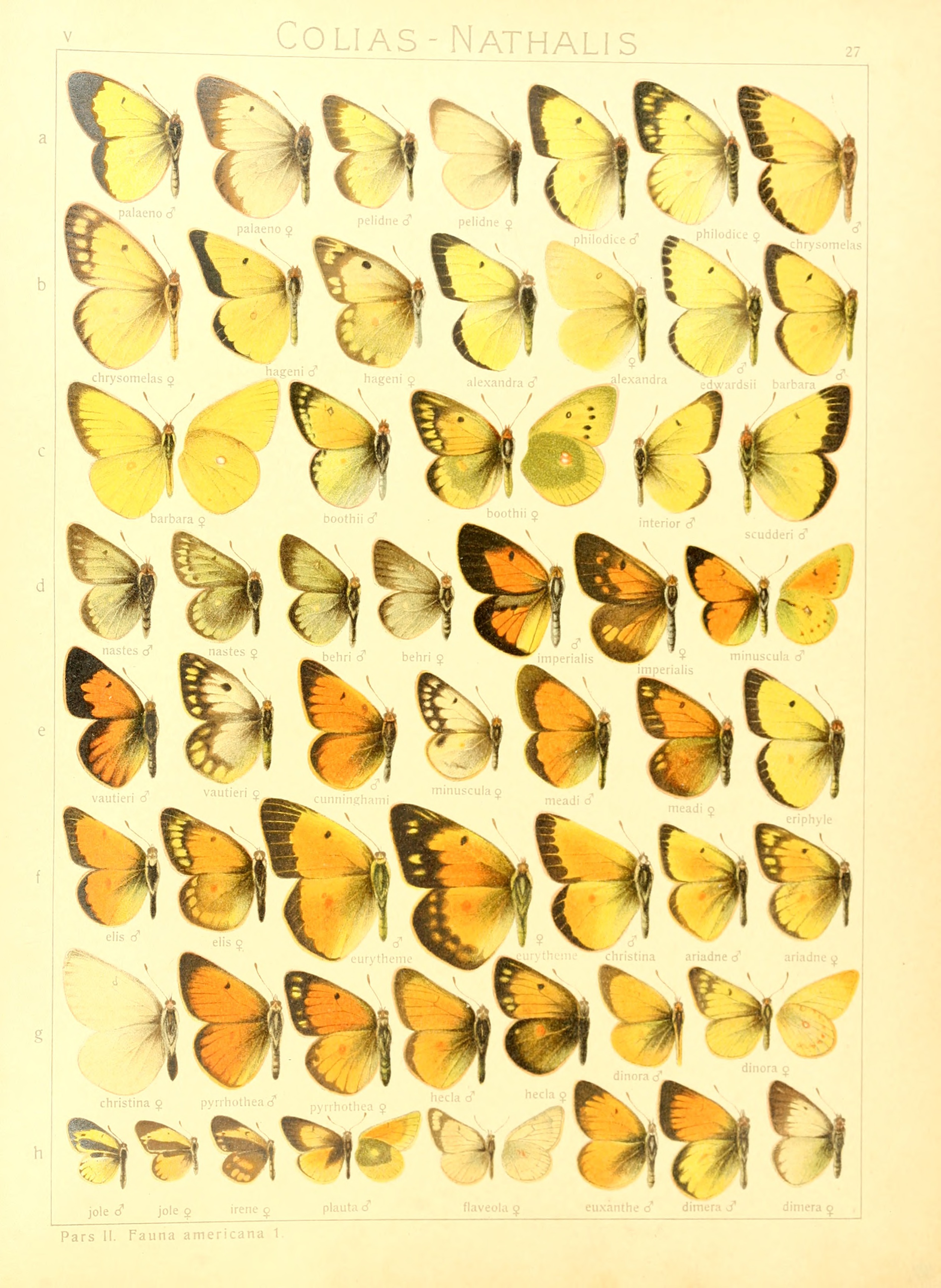
C. euxanthe is in the bottom row, third from the right
