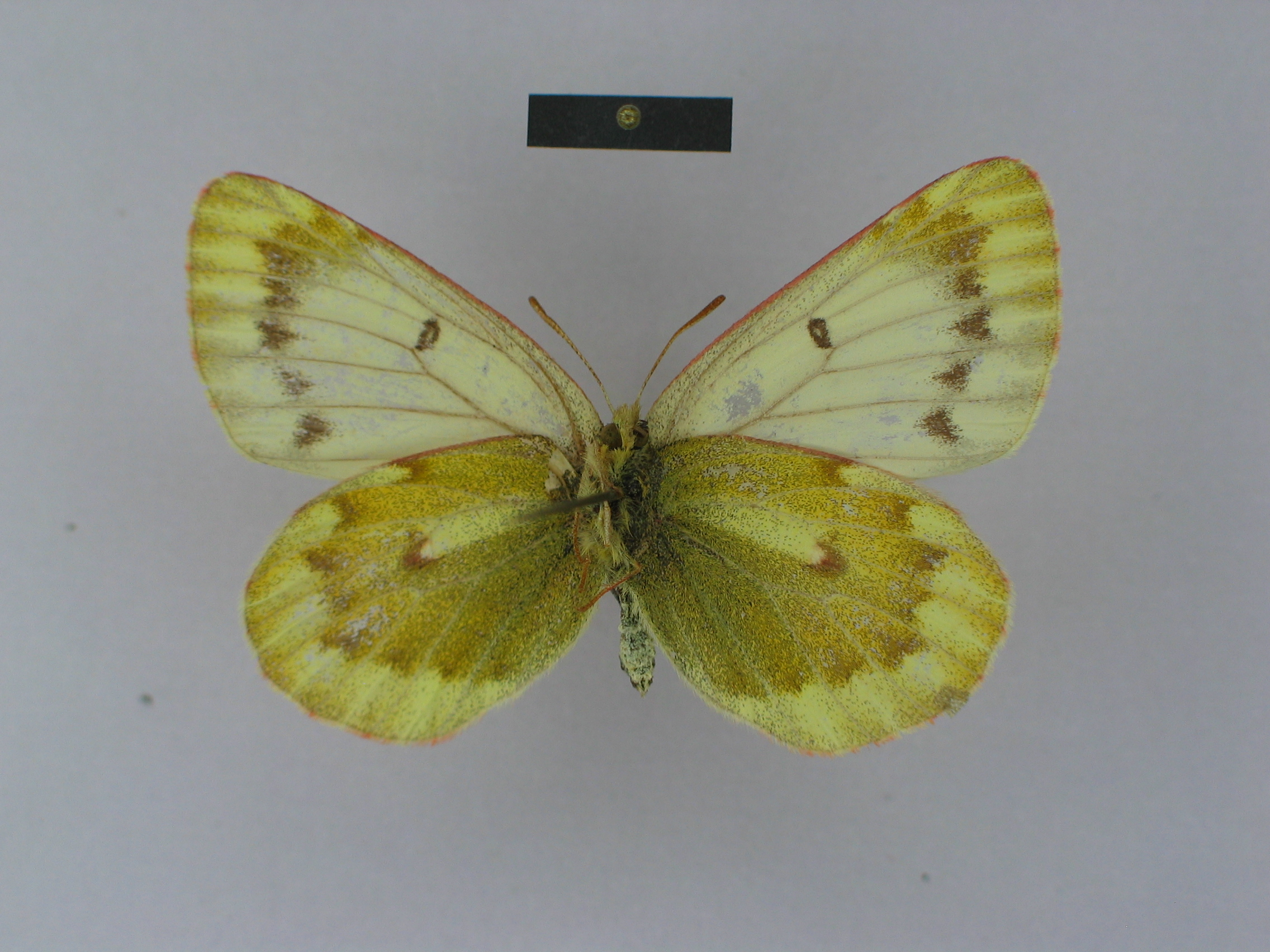

Scientific classification
- Kingdom: Animalia
- Phylum: Arthropoda
- Clade: Pancrustacea
- Class: Insecta
- Order: Lepidoptera
- Family: Pieridae
- Genus: Colias
- Species: C. thrasibulus

Binomial name
- Colias thrasibulus Fabricius, 1910

= Colias thrasibulus =

Lemon clouded yellow

Species of butterfly

Colias thrasibulus, the lemon clouded yellow, is a small butterfly of the family Pieridae, that is, the yellows and whites. It is found in India.

== See also ==
- List of butterflies of India
- List of butterflies of India (Pieridae)
