= Colias mukana =

Scientific classification
- Kingdom: Animalia
- Phylum: Arthropoda
- Class: Insecta
- Order: Lepidoptera
- Family: Pieridae
- Genus: Colias
- Species: C. mukana

Binomial name
- Colias mukana Berger, 1981

Synonyms
- Colias electo mukana Berger, 1981

Species of butterfly

Colias mukana is a butterfly in the family Pieridae. It is found in the Democratic Republic of Congo (central Shaba) and Malawi.

== Subspecies ==
- Colias mukana mukana (Democratic Republic of Congo)
- Colias mukana jolyi Verhulst, 2006 (Malawi)
