= Colias johanseni =

Devon sulphur

Conservation status
- Extinct (C. 1930)

Scientific classification
- Kingdom: Animalia
- Phylum: Arthropoda
- Clade: Pancrustacea
- Class: Insecta
- Order: Lepidoptera
- Family: Pieridae
- Genus: Colias
- Species: †C. johanseni

Binomial name
- †Colias johanseni Troubridge & Philip, 1990

Species of butterfly

Colias johanseni, the Johansen's sulphur, is a butterfly in the family Pieridae found in North America. It is endemic to Nunavut, Canada.

Flight period is July.

Wingspan is from 35 to 38 mm.

Larvae feed on Hedysarum mackenzii.
