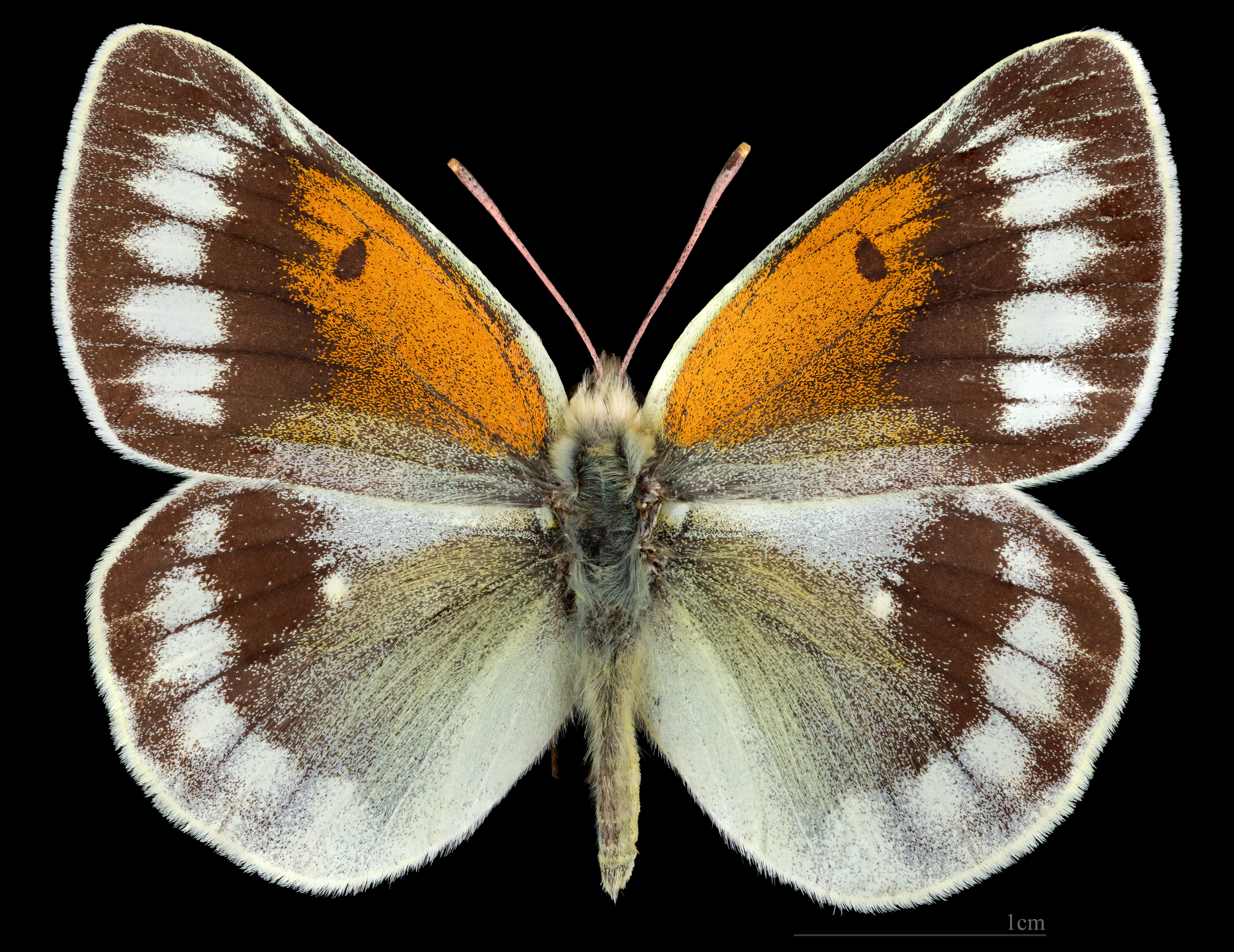
- Colias christophi christophi ♂
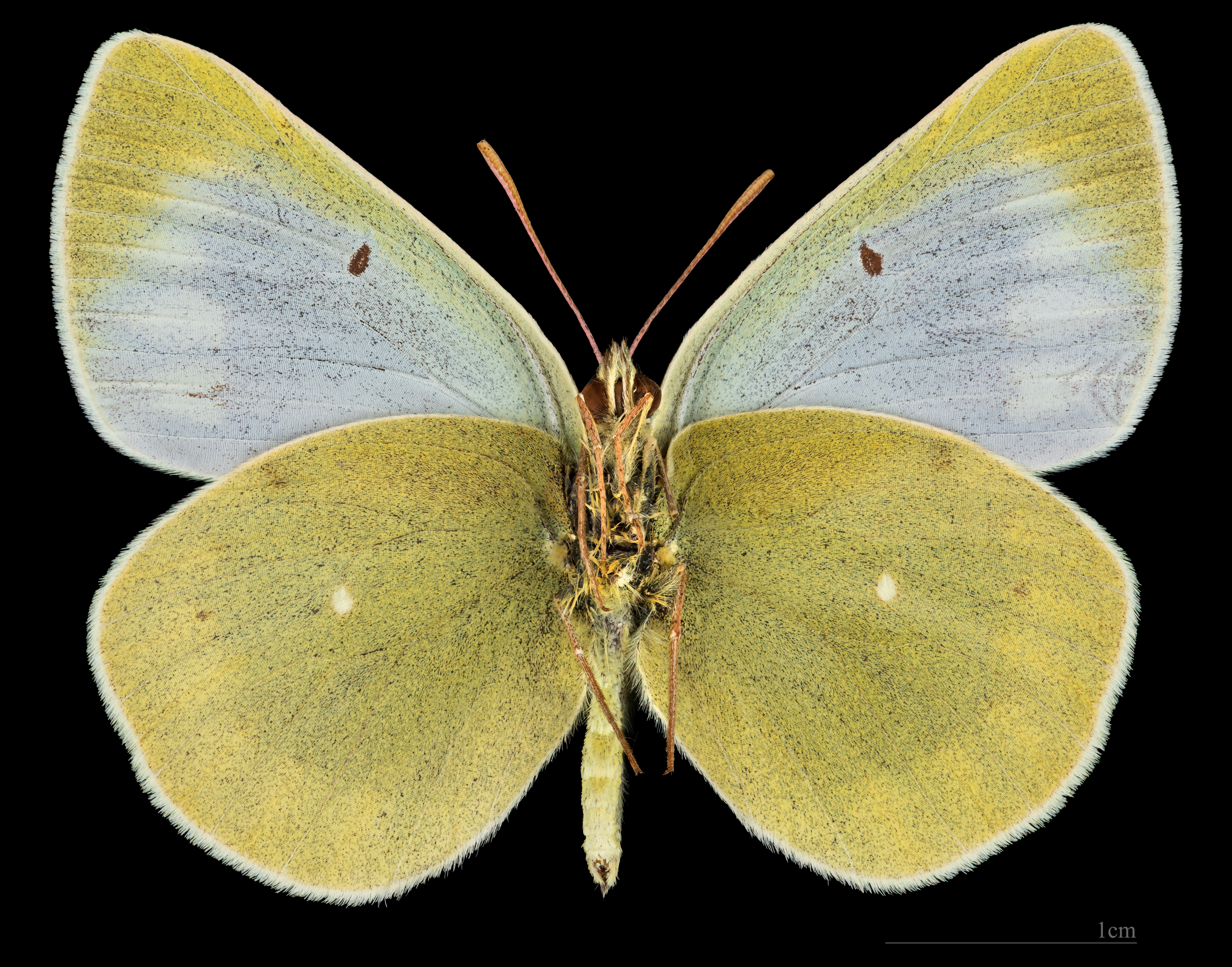
- Colias christophi christophi ♂ △

Scientific classification
- Kingdom: Animalia
- Phylum: Arthropoda
- Class: Insecta
- Order: Lepidoptera
- Family: Pieridae
- Genus: Colias
- Species: C. christophi

Binomial name
- Colias christophi Grum-Grshimailo, 1885

Synonyms
- Colias christophi aufderheidei Kotzsch, 1929; Colias christophi heidei Kotzsch, 1929; Colias christophi bang-haasi Bollow, 1930; Colias christophi ab. novosiltzovi Avinoff, 1910; Colias christophi helialaica Schulte, 1988; Colias christophi simplicissima Avinoff, 1910

= Colias christophi =

Species of butterfly

Colias christophi is a butterfly in the family Pieridae. It is found in Kyrgyzstan and Tajikistan.

== Description ==
Colias christophi has quite an exceptional aspect among Colias, the costal basal area having a peculiar reddish-brown colour, and the submarginal spots of the forewing being extraordinarily large and almost white, forming a continuous band which is traversed by the narrowly black veins. The hindwing is dark, feebly greenish with a white middle spot and a band of white submarginal spots. The underside is grey green, with a black middle spot on the forewing and a white one on the hindwing. The female differs only in the somewhat larger light submarginal spots on both wings.

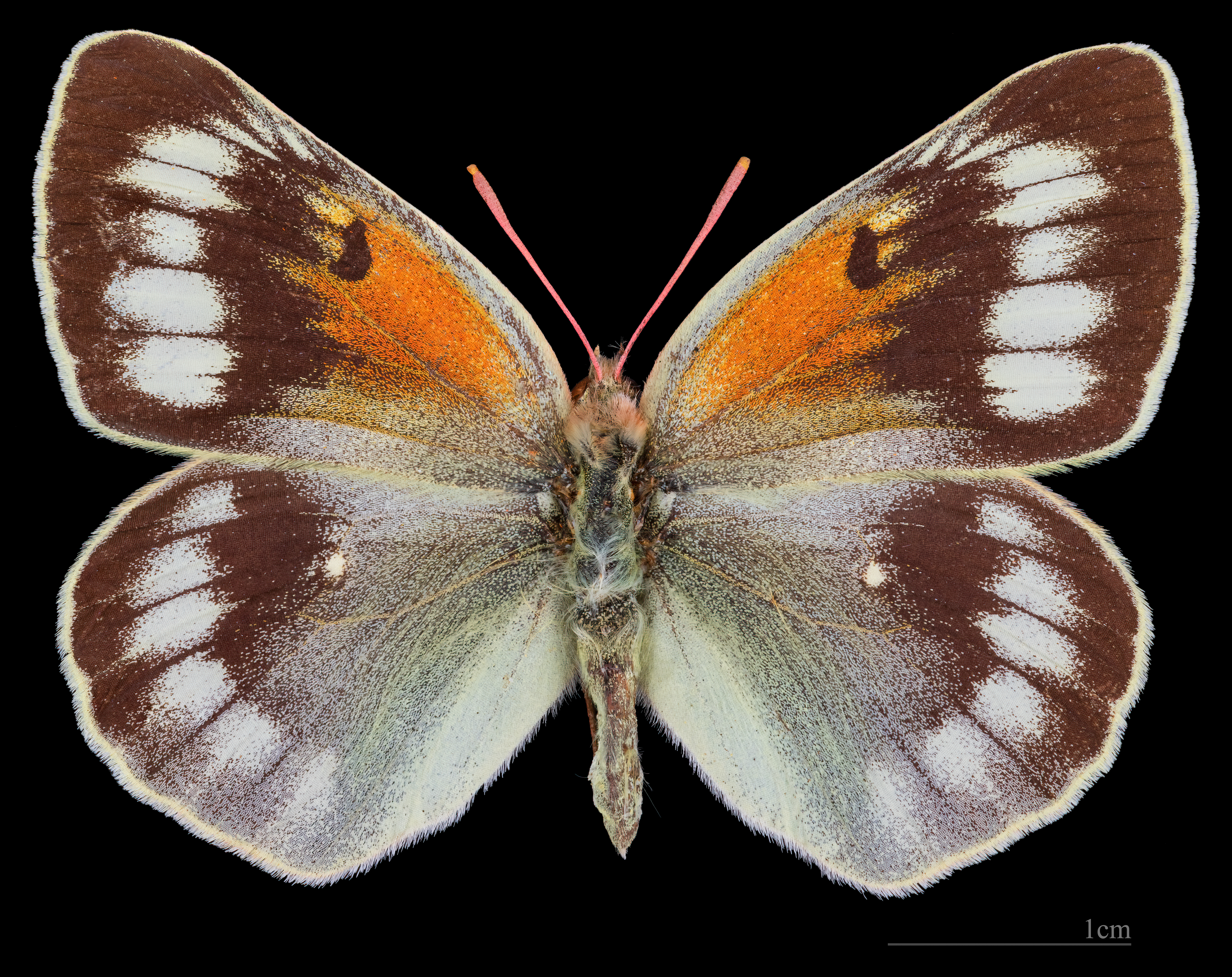
Colias christophi ♀

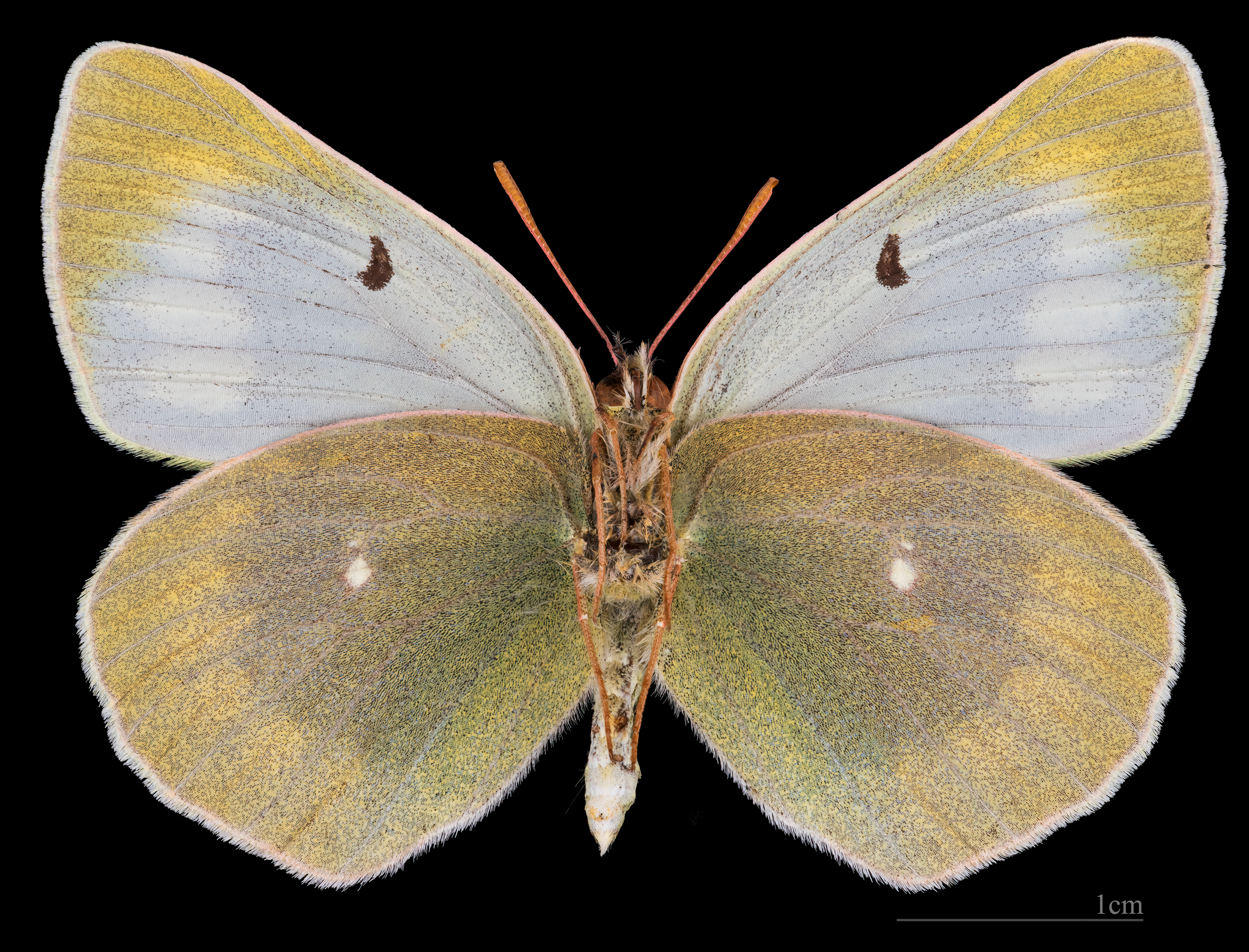
Colias christophi ♀△

== Subspecies ==
- C. c. christophi Kyrgyzstan
- C. c. kali Korb, 1999 Tajikistan
