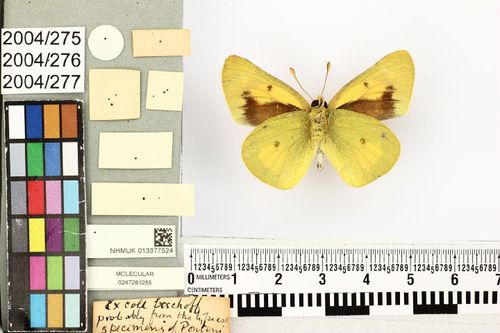

Scientific classification
- Kingdom: Animalia
- Phylum: Arthropoda
- Clade: Pancrustacea
- Class: Insecta
- Order: Lepidoptera
- Family: Pieridae
- Genus: Colias
- Species: C. ponteni

Binomial name
- Colias ponteni Wallengren, 1860

Synonyms
- Colias imperialis Butler, 1871

= Colias ponteni =

Species of butterfly

Colias ponteni is a butterfly in the family Pieridae that is thought to be extinct.

While original specimens were collected in the mid-19th century, the probable species provenance is uncertain, and they have never been collected since.
