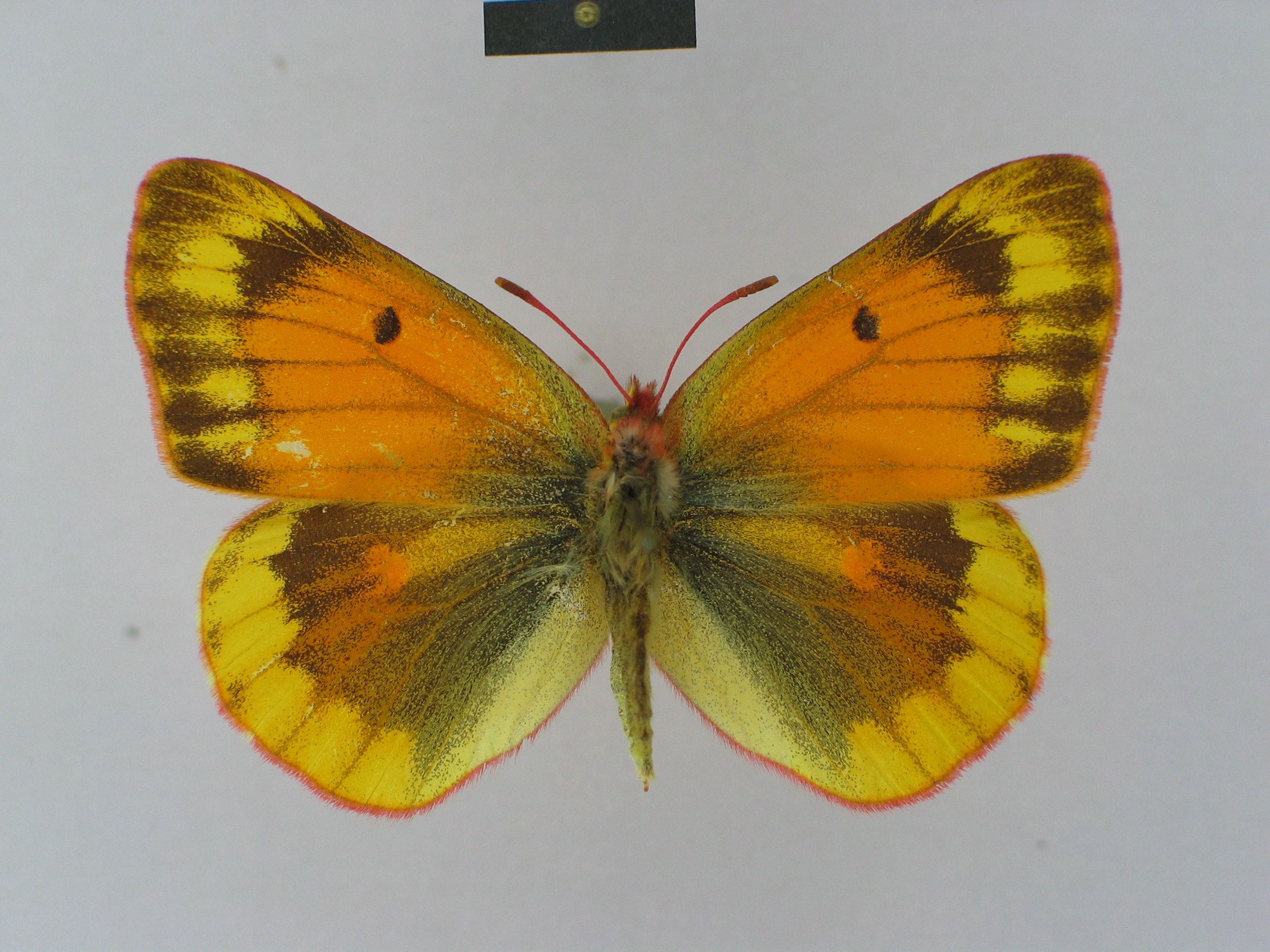

Scientific classification
- Kingdom: Animalia
- Phylum: Arthropoda
- Class: Insecta
- Order: Lepidoptera
- Family: Pieridae
- Genus: Colias
- Species: C. felderi

Binomial name
- Colias felderi Grum-Grshimailo, 1891

= Colias felderi =

Species of butterfly

Colias felderi is a butterfly in the family Pieridae. It is found in Tibet and China.

== Description ==
Colias felderi is light orange red with a black margin, which is traversed by the yellow veins at the apex of the wing, and with a black middle spot. The hindwing has a yellowish band before the black distal margin. The underside, which has nothing distinctive, is without submarginal spots.

== Taxonomy ==
Originally described as Colias species felderi Grum-Grshimailo, 1891 "in regione Amdo dicta, in montibus ad Sinin". It was accepted as a species by Josef Grieshuber & Gerardo Lamas.

== Etymology ==
The name honours Rudolf Felder.
