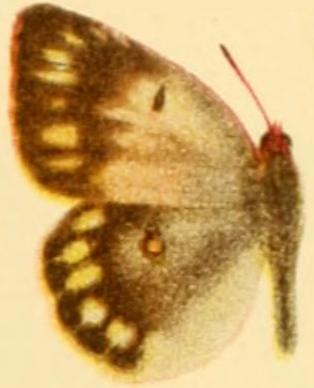

Scientific classification
- Kingdom: Animalia
- Phylum: Arthropoda
- Class: Insecta
- Order: Lepidoptera
- Family: Pieridae
- Genus: Colias
- Species: C. diva

Binomial name
- Colias diva Grum-Grshimailo, 1891

= Colias diva =

Species of butterfly

Colias diva is a butterfly in the family Pieridae. It is found in Tibet and western China.
