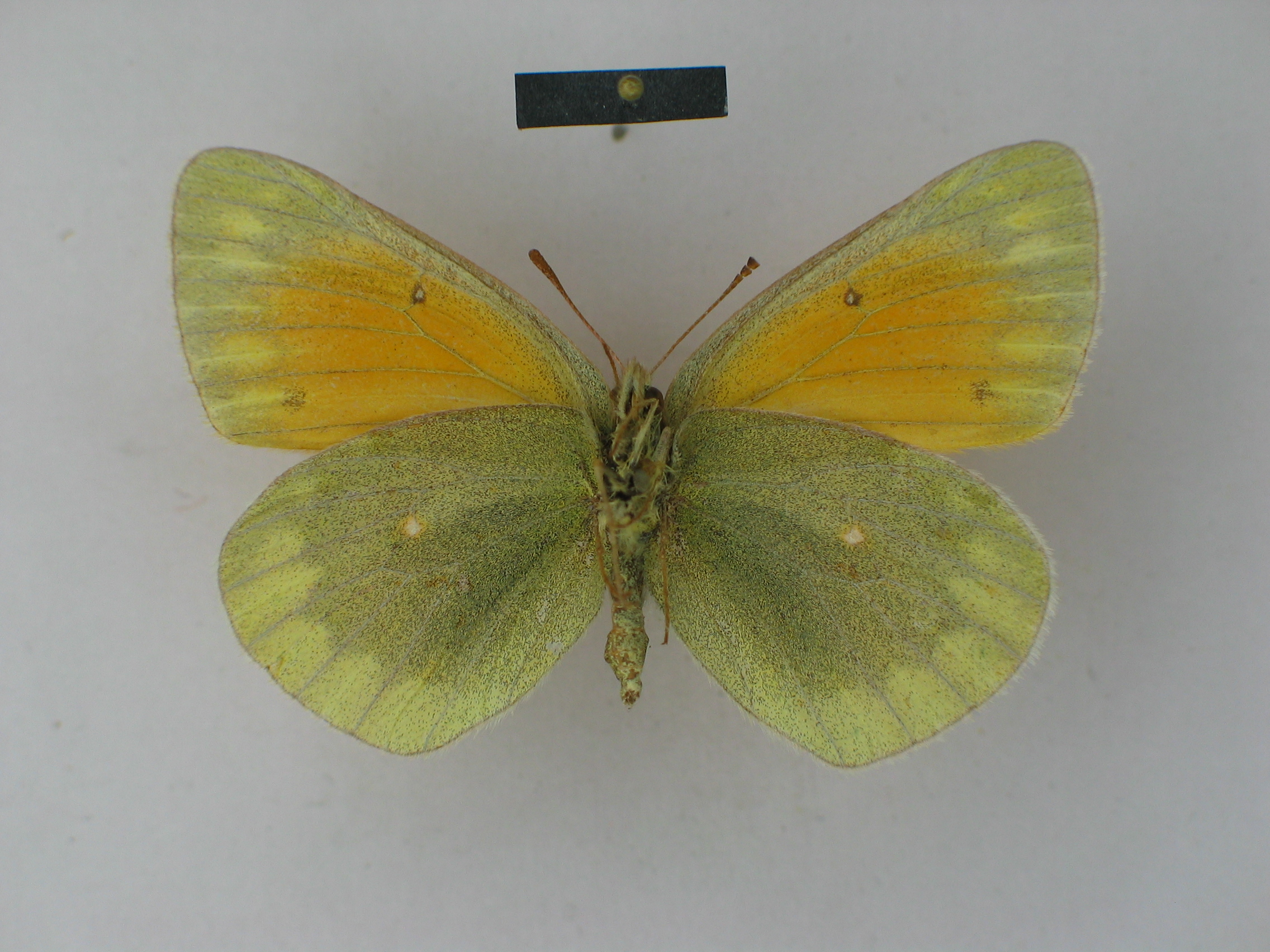

Scientific classification
- Kingdom: Animalia
- Phylum: Arthropoda
- Class: Insecta
- Order: Lepidoptera
- Family: Pieridae
- Genus: Colias
- Species: C. lada

Binomial name
- Colias lada Grum-Grshimailo, 1891

Synonyms
- Colias lada ab. oreas Grum-Grshimailo, 1893

= Colias lada =

Species of butterfly

Colias lada is a butterfly in the family Pieridae. It is found in the East Palearctic (Tibet, China).

== Description ==
Colias lada is deep yolk-colour, with rather narrow black distal margin, the middle spot of the forewing small; female with strongly darkened hindwing, the posterior portion of the distal margin being conspicuously yellow.

== Taxonomy ==
Accepted as a species by Josef Grieshuber & Gerardo Lamas
