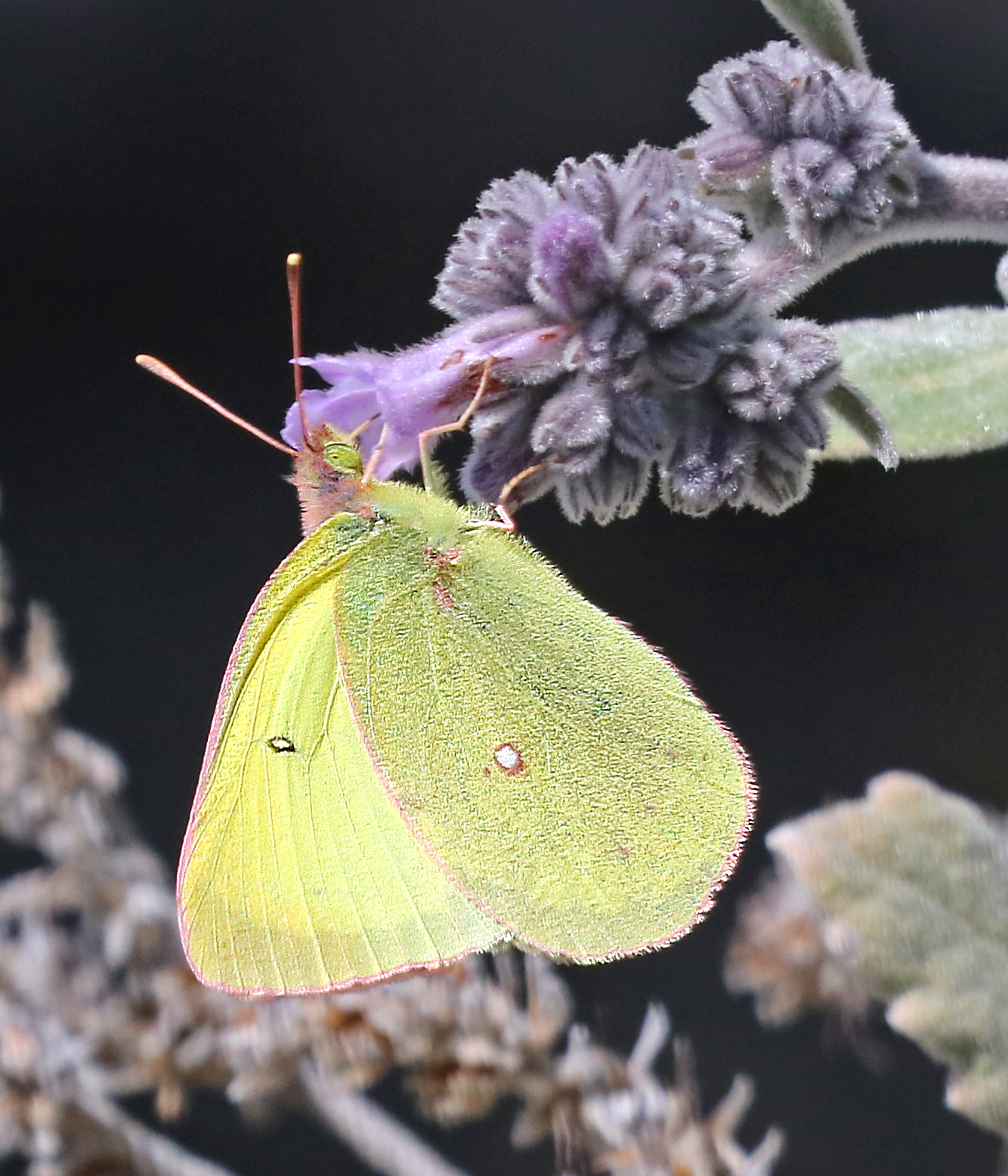

Scientific classification
- Kingdom: Animalia
- Phylum: Arthropoda
- Class: Insecta
- Order: Lepidoptera
- Family: Pieridae
- Genus: Colias
- Species: C. harfordii

Binomial name
- Colias harfordii H. Edwards, 1877

Synonyms
- Colias barbara H. Edwards, 1877; Eurymus hartfordii ab. weaverae Gunder, 1924; Eurymus harfordii f. martini Gunder, 1931

= Colias harfordii =

Harford's sulphur

Species of butterfly

Colias harfordii, the Harford's sulphur, is a butterfly in the family Pieridae. It is found from the southern California coastal ranges and canyons from Kern County south to San Diego County. The habitat consists of open chaparral and woodland clearings.

The wingspan is 44–51 mm (1.7–2.0 in). Adults are on wing from February to May and again from June to August in two generations per year. Adults feed on flower nectar of thistles and mints.

The larvae feed on the leaves of Astragalus douglasii. The species overwinters in the larval stage.
