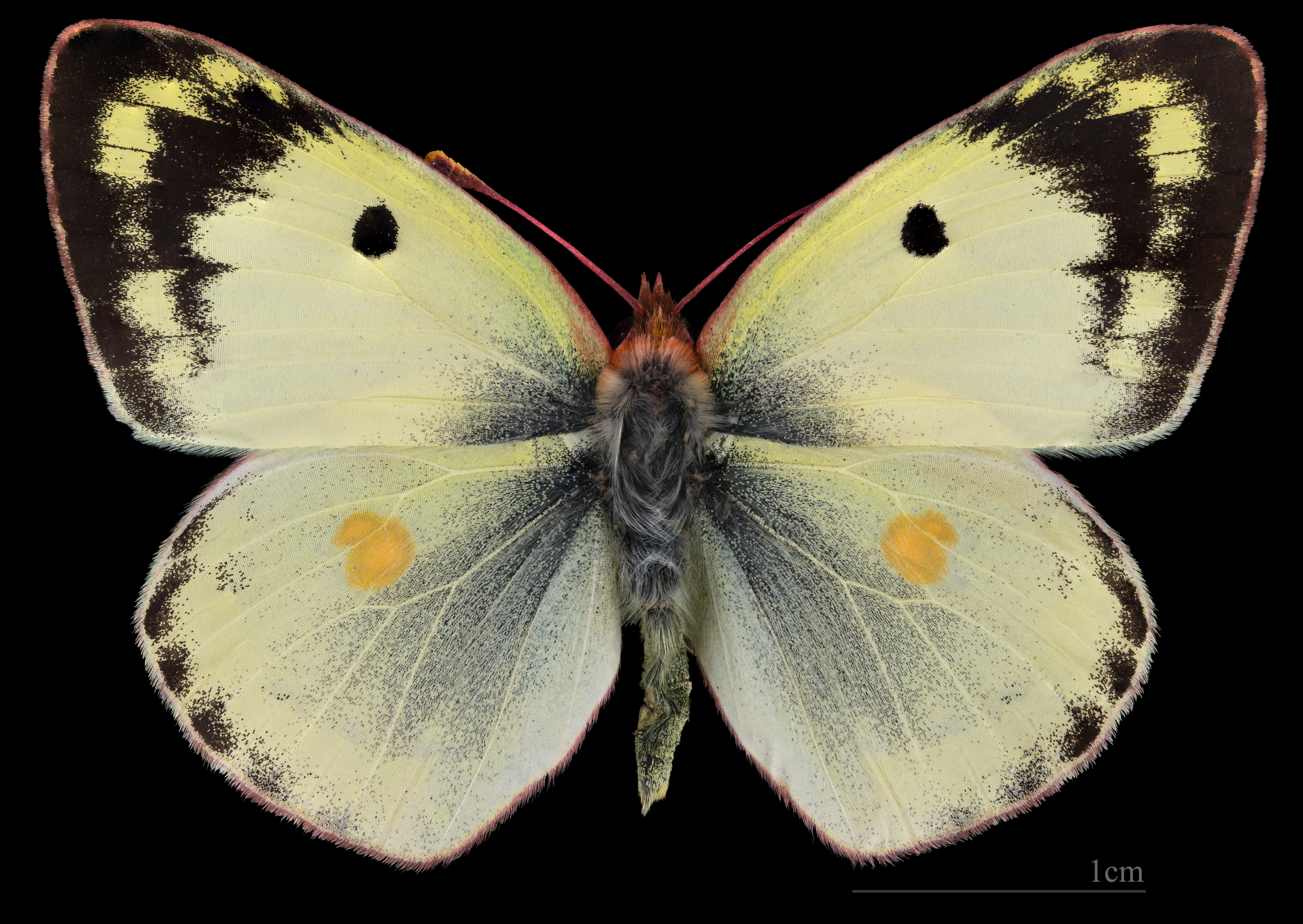
- Colias hyale – type species for the genus

Scientific classification
- Kingdom: Animalia
- Phylum: Arthropoda
- Clade: Pancrustacea
- Class: Insecta
- Order: Lepidoptera
- Family: Pieridae
- Tribe: Coliadini
- Genus: Colias; Fabricius, 1807

Type species
- Papilio hyale Linnaeus, 1758

Synonyms
- Eurymus Horsfield, [1829]; Ganura Zetterstedt, [1839]; Scalidoneura Butler, 1871; Eriocolias Watson, 1895; Coliastes Hemming, 1931; Protocolias Petersen, 1963; Mesocolias Petersen, 1963; Neocolias Berger, 1986; Palaeocolias Berger, 1986; Eucolias Berger, 1986; Similicolias Berger, 1986; Paracolias Berger, 1986

= Colias =

Clouded yellows

Butterfly genus in family Pieridae

Colias is a genus of butterflies in the family Pieridae. They are often called clouded yellows in the Palearctic and sulphurs (a name also used for other coliadine genera) in North America. The closest living relative is the genus Zerene, which is sometimes included in Colias.

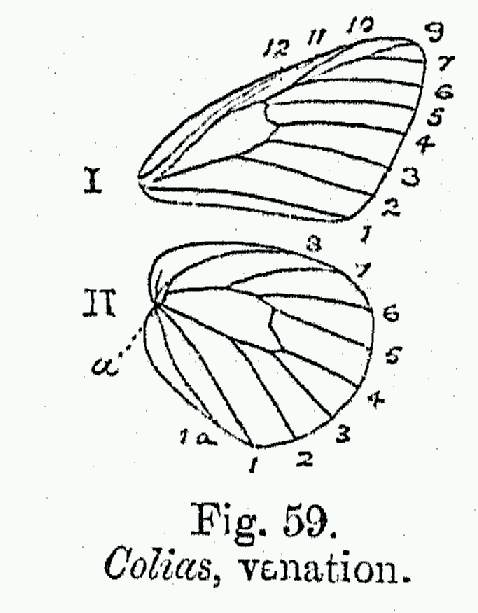
Wing venation

This genus occurs throughout the Holarctic, including the arctic regions. They are also found in South America, Africa, China and India. Their caterpillars feed on certain Fabaceae, for example vetches (Vicia). The adults forage for nectar. most are thus beneficial by keeping weeds at bay, some occasionally become nuisance pests on crops like alfalfa. In some species, the wings of males have brilliant ultraviolet reflection, while those of females do not. Adults of both sexes have various colour forms. Males are particularly conservative based on their genitalia structures. These structures are difficult to identify making it difficult to classify the Colias.

Most if not all species of this genus, as usual for Coliadinae, do not sequester toxins or other noxious compounds from their food plants. They are therefore a preferred prey item of insectivores as compared to Pieris of the related Pierinae. They make up this disadvantage by being more nimble and better able to evade attacks by would-be predators.

Notable lepidopterologists who did many studies on this genus included Julius Röber, J. Malcolm Fawcett, George B. Johnson and Henry Rowland-Brown.

== Systematics ==
Hybridization runs rampant in these polytypic and clinal butterflies, confounding molecular phylogenetics studies. In general, cladistic analyses of only one type of data (particularly mtDNA sequences) cannot be considered reliable. Regardless, the evolutionary distance within some "species" is so large that cryptic speciation rather than (or in addition to) interbreeding seems to be the cause. For example, the Beringian populations traditionally assigned to the northern clouded yellow (C. hecla) could warrant recognition as a species; hybridization between North American and Asian populations seems to have played a role in their evolution, but as a whole they appear to be a rather old and distinct lineage.

== Thermoregulation ==
Colias are behavioral thermoregulators. They will move their habitats in order to regulate their body temperature. This leads to them having specific and narrow temperature ranges that they could live in. This leaves the Colias to be extremely vulnerable to climate change. The degree of melanism on their wings and fur thickness are major parts of their thermoregulation. The wing absorption/melanization is determined by the proportions of their coloration. They are in a class of pollinators that require minimum fuel due to their small size. When they need pollen they are attracted to flower patterns in the ultraviolet, similar to themselves.

== Flight ==
Colias spend most of their time in active flight and are very strong flyers, but they have flight restrictions based on their body temperature. Flight activity is restricted to between 27-40 degrees Celsius. Their flight performance is best once at 33-38 degrees Celsius. In order to maintain these temperatures the Colias will use a lateral basking posture. When they reach a temperature outside of the flight activity zone, Colias will find a shaded area under plants in order to cool down.

=== Species ===
The genus Colias has approximately 90 different species. It is often difficult to find differences between the species, since they are mostly identified through their wing structure and pattern.

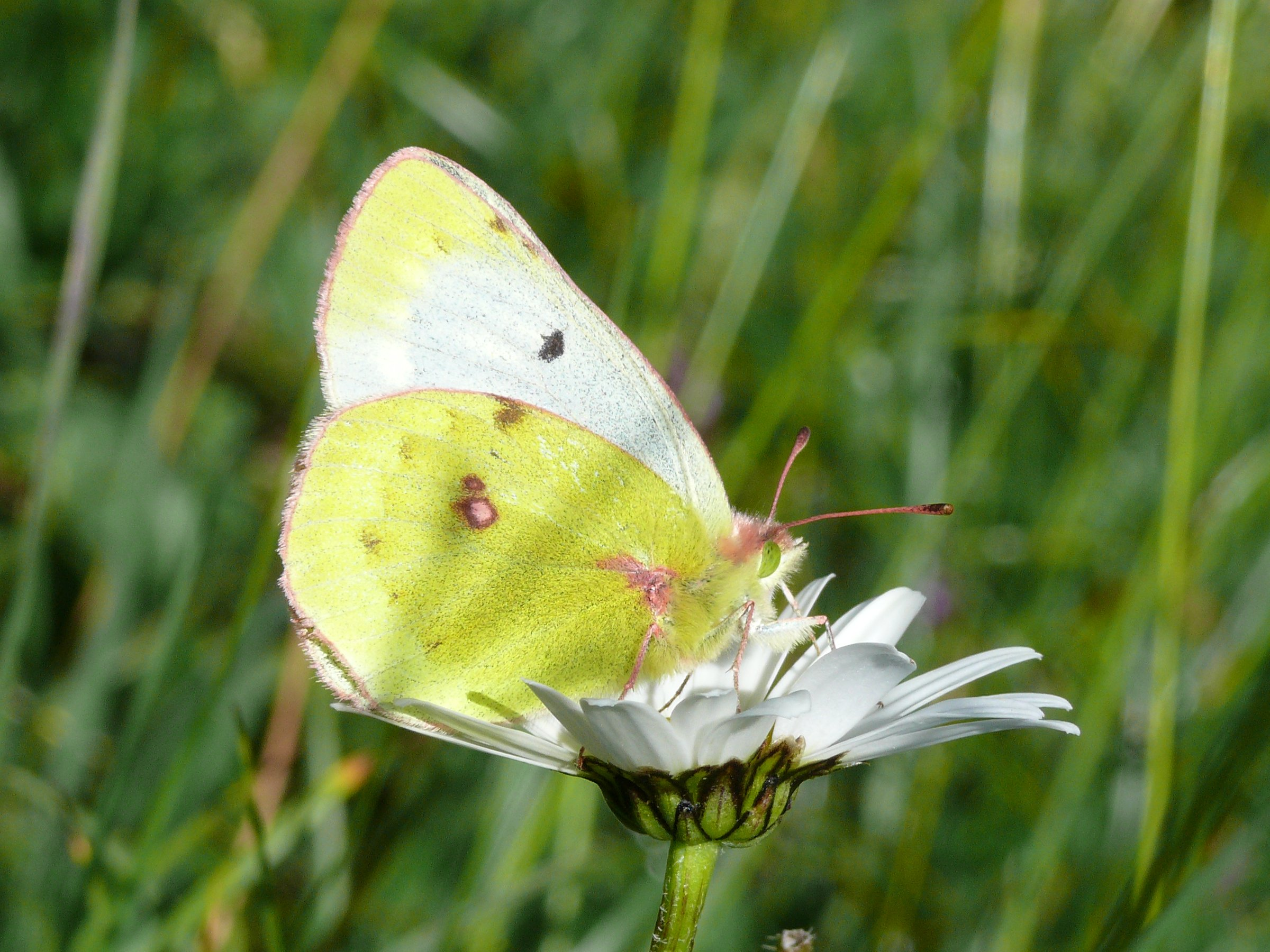
Mountain clouded yellow (C. phicomone)

Listed alphabetically:

- Colias adelaidae Verhulst, 1991
- Colias aegidii Verhulst, 1990
- Colias alfacariensis Ribbe, 1905 – Berger's clouded yellow
- Colias alexandra W. H. Edwards, 1863 – Queen Alexandra's sulphur, Alexandra sulfur, or ultraviolet sulfur
- Colias alpherakii Staudinger, 1882
- Colias aquilonaris Grum-Grshimailo, 1899
- Colias arida Alphéraky, 1889
- Colias audre (Hemming, 1933)
- Colias aurorina Herrich-Schäffer, 1850 – Greek clouded butterfly or dawn clouded yellow
- Colias baeckeri Kotzsch, 1930
- Colias behrii W. H. Edwards, 1866 – Behr's sulphur or Sierra green sulfur
- Colias berylla Fawcett, 1904 – Everest clouded yellow
- Colias canadensis Ferris, 1982 – Canada sulphur
- Colias caucasica Staudinger, 1871 – Balkan clouded yellow
- Colias chippewa W. H. Edwards, 1872 – heath sulphur
- Colias chlorocoma Christoph, 1888
- Colias christina W. H. Edwards, 1863 – Christina sulphur
- Colias christophi Grum-Grshimailo, 1885
- Colias chrysotheme (Esper, 1781) – lesser clouded yellow
- Colias cocandica Erschoff, 1874
- Colias croceus (Geoffroy, 1785) – dark clouded yellow or common clouded yellow
- Colias dimera Doubleday, 1847 – dimera sulphur
- Colias diva Grum-Grshimailo, 1891
- Colias dubia Fawcett, 1906 – dwarf clouded yellow
- Colias electo (Linnaeus, 1763) – African clouded yellow
- Colias elegans Schultz, 1904
- Colias elis Strecker, 1885 (often included in C. meadii; paraphyletic?)
- Colias eogene C. & R. Felder, 1865 – fiery clouded yellow
- Colias erate (Esper, 1805) – eastern pale clouded yellow
- Colias erschoffi Alphéraky, 1881
- Colias eurytheme Boisduval, 1852 – orange sulphur, alfalfa butterfly
- Colias euxanthe C. & R. Felder, 1865 – Puno clouded yellow
- Colias felderi Grum-Grshimailo, 1891
- Colias fieldii Ménétriés, 1855

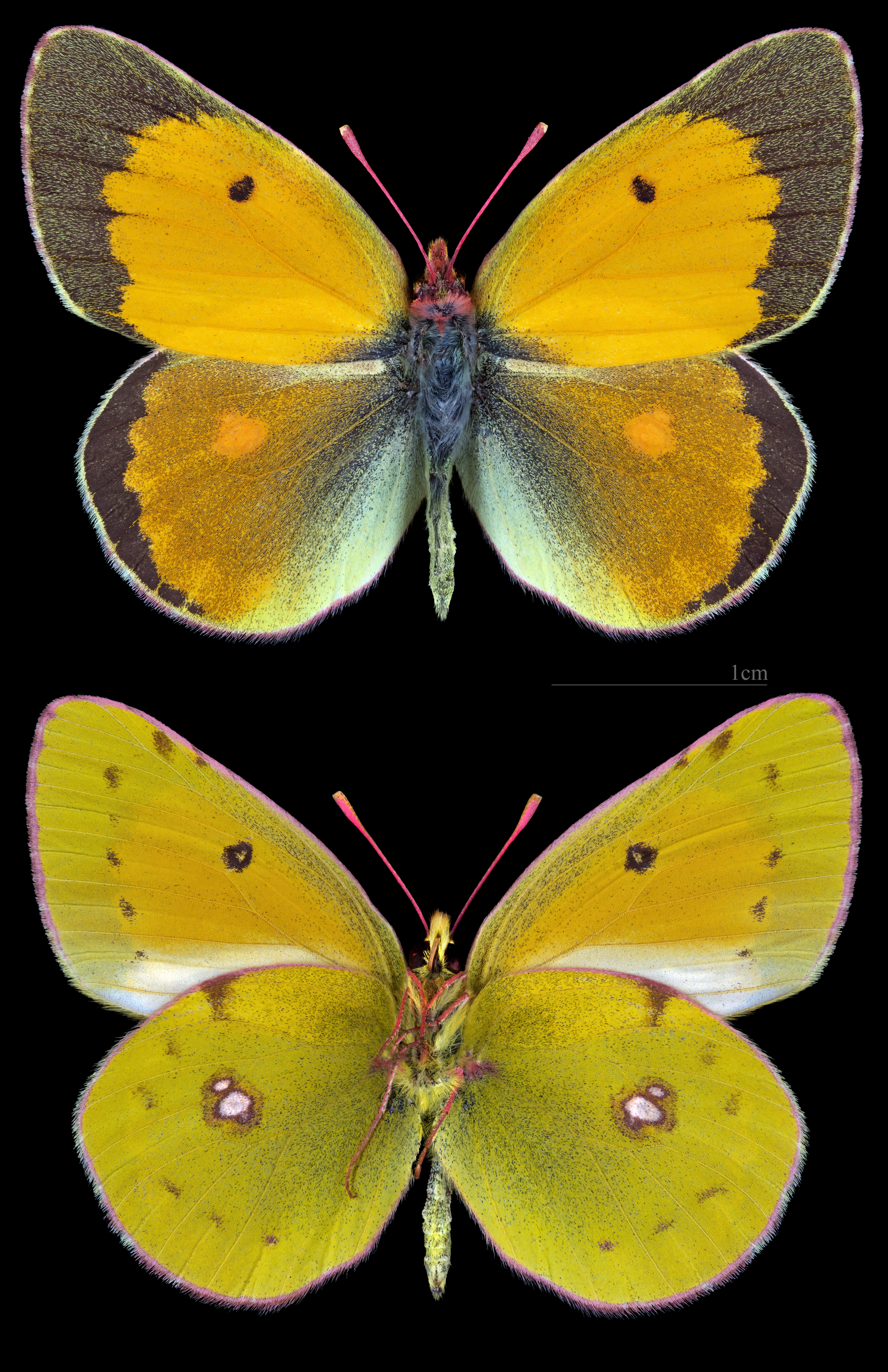
Danube clouded yellow (C. myrmidone)

- Colias flaveola Blanchard, 1852 – flaveola clouded yellow
- Colias gigantea Strecker, 1900 – great (northern) sulphur
- Colias grumi Alpheraky, 1897
- Colias harfordii W. H. Edwards, 1877 – Harford's sulphur
- Colias hecla Lefèbvre, 1836 – northern clouded yellow, Greenland sulphur, or hecla sulphur (paraphyletic?)
- Colias heos (Herbst, 1792)
- Colias hofmannorum Eckweiler, 2000
- Colias hyale (Linnaeus, 1758) – pale clouded yellow
- Colias hyperborea Grum-Grshimailo, 1899
- Colias interior Scudder, 1862 – pink-edged sulphur
- Colias johanseni Troubridge & Philip, 1990 – Johansen's sulphur
- Colias krauthii Klots, 1935
- Colias lada Grum-Grshimailo, 1891
- Colias ladakensis Felder & Felder, 1865 – Ladakh clouded yellow
- Colias leechi Grum-Grshimailio, 1893
- Colias lesbia (Fabricius, 1775) – Lesbia clouded yellow
- Colias libanotica Lederer, 1858 (sometimes included in C. aurorina)
- Colias marcopolo Grum-Grshimailo, 1888
- Colias marnoana Rogenhofer, 1884
- Colias meadii W. H. Edwards, 1871 – Mead's sulphur
- Colias montium Oberthür, 1886
- Colias mukana Berger, 1981
- Colias myrmidone (Esper, 1781) – Danube clouded yellow
- Colias nastes Boisduval, 1834 – Labrador sulphur
- Colias nebulosa Oberthür, 1894
- Colias nilagiriensis Felder, C & R Felder, 1859
- Colias nina Fawcett, 1904 – Fawcett's clouded yellow
- Colias occidentalis Scudder, 1862 – western sulphur or golden sulfur
- Colias palaeno (Linnaeus, 1761) – moorland clouded yellow, Arctic sulphur, palaeno sulphur or pale Arctic clouded yellow
- Colias pelidne Boisduval & Le Conte, 1829 – blueberry sulphur or pelidne sulphur
- Colias phicomone (Esper, 1780) – mountain clouded yellow
- Colias philodice Godart, 1819 – common sulphur, clouded sulphur
- Colias ponteni Wallengren, 1860
- Colias pseudochristina Ferris, 1989
- Colias regia Grum-Grshimailo, 1887
- Colias romanovi Grum-Grshimailo, 1885
- Colias sagartia Lederer, 1869
- Colias scudderii Reakirt, 1865 – willow sulphur
- Colias shahfuladi Clench & Shoumatoff, 1956
- Colias sieversi Grum-Grshimailo, 1887
- Colias sifanica Grum-Grshimailo, 1891
- Colias staudingeri Alphéraky, 1881
- Colias stoliczkana Moore, 1882 – orange clouded yellow
- Colias tamerlana Staudinger, 1897
- Colias thisoa Ménétriés, 1832
- Colias thrasibulus Fruhstorfer, 1908 – lemon clouded yellow
- Colias thula Hovanitz, 1955 – Thula sulphur
- Colias tibetana Riley, 1922
- Colias tyche (Böber, 1812) – pale Arctic clouded yellow, Arctic green sulphur, or Booth's sulphur
- Colias viluiensis (Ménétriés, 1859)
- Colias wanda Grum-Grshimaïlo, 1907
- Colias wiskotti Staudinger, 1882

== Distinguishing characteristics ==
Colias are usually some shade of yellow, orange or white. Their uppersides feature black borders (usually solid in males, often with pale spots in females). They always perch with wings closed, but upperside pattern may be seen faintly through the wing, or glimpsed in flight.

== Gallery ==
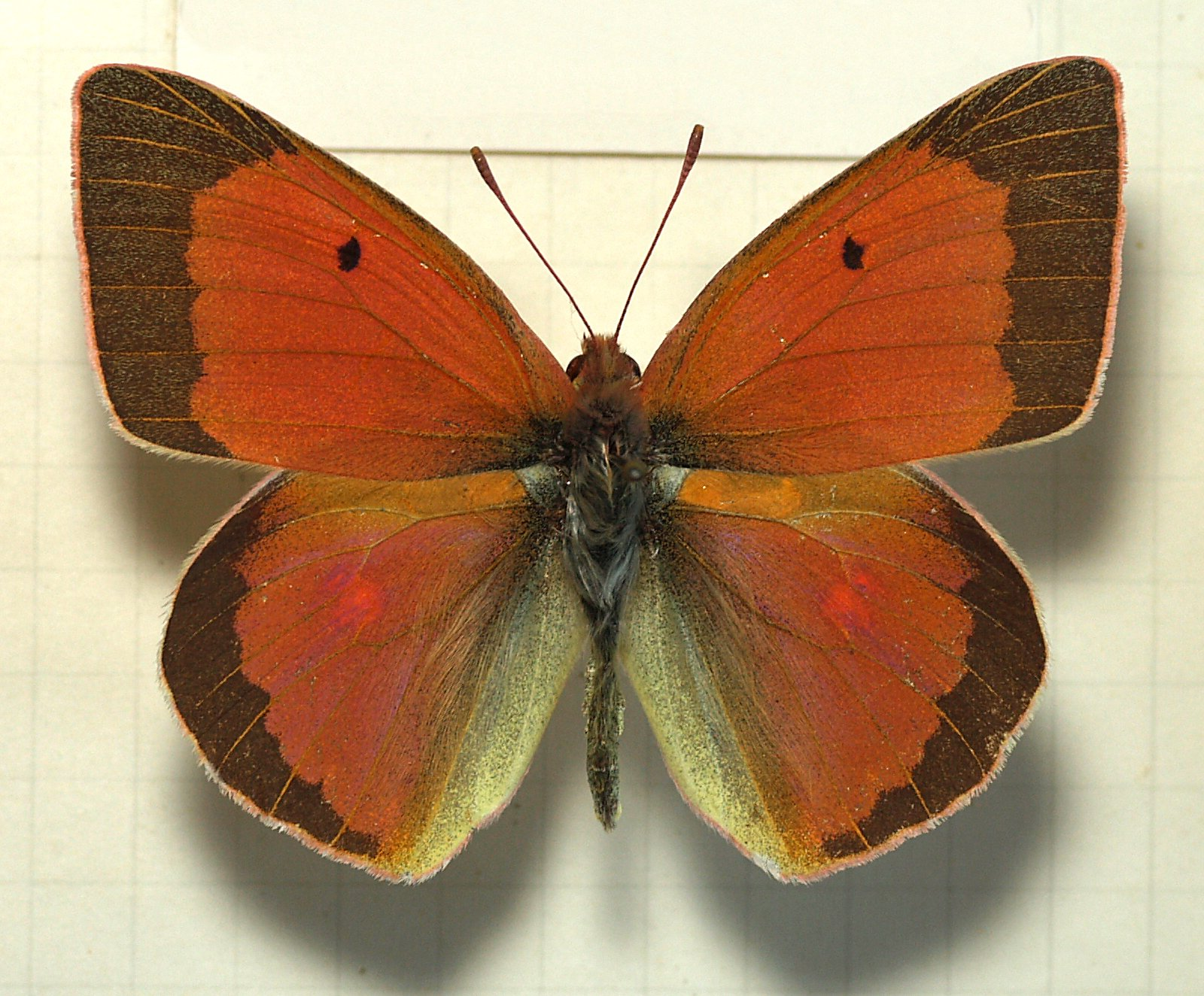
Colias aurorina heldreichi, male

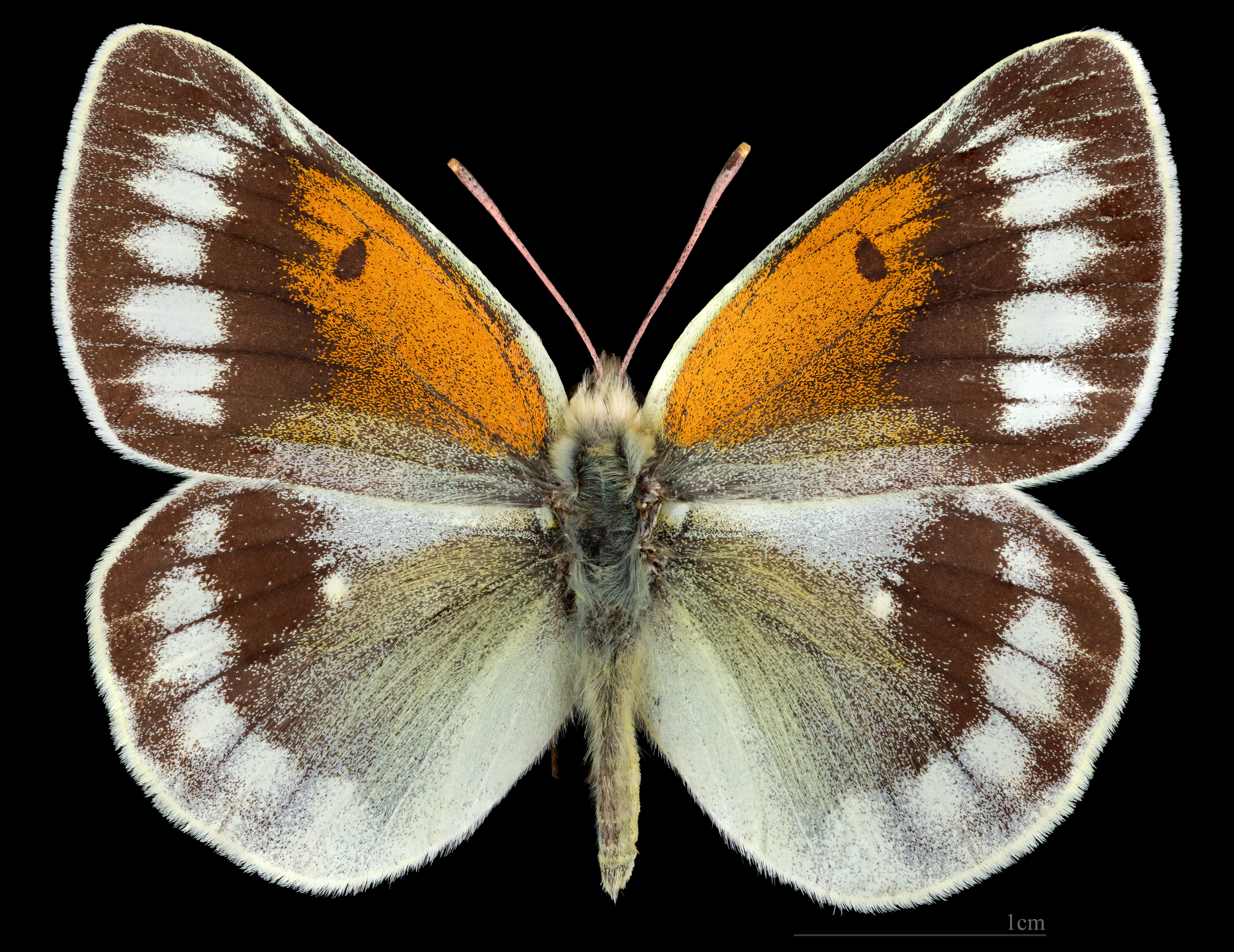
Colias christophi, male

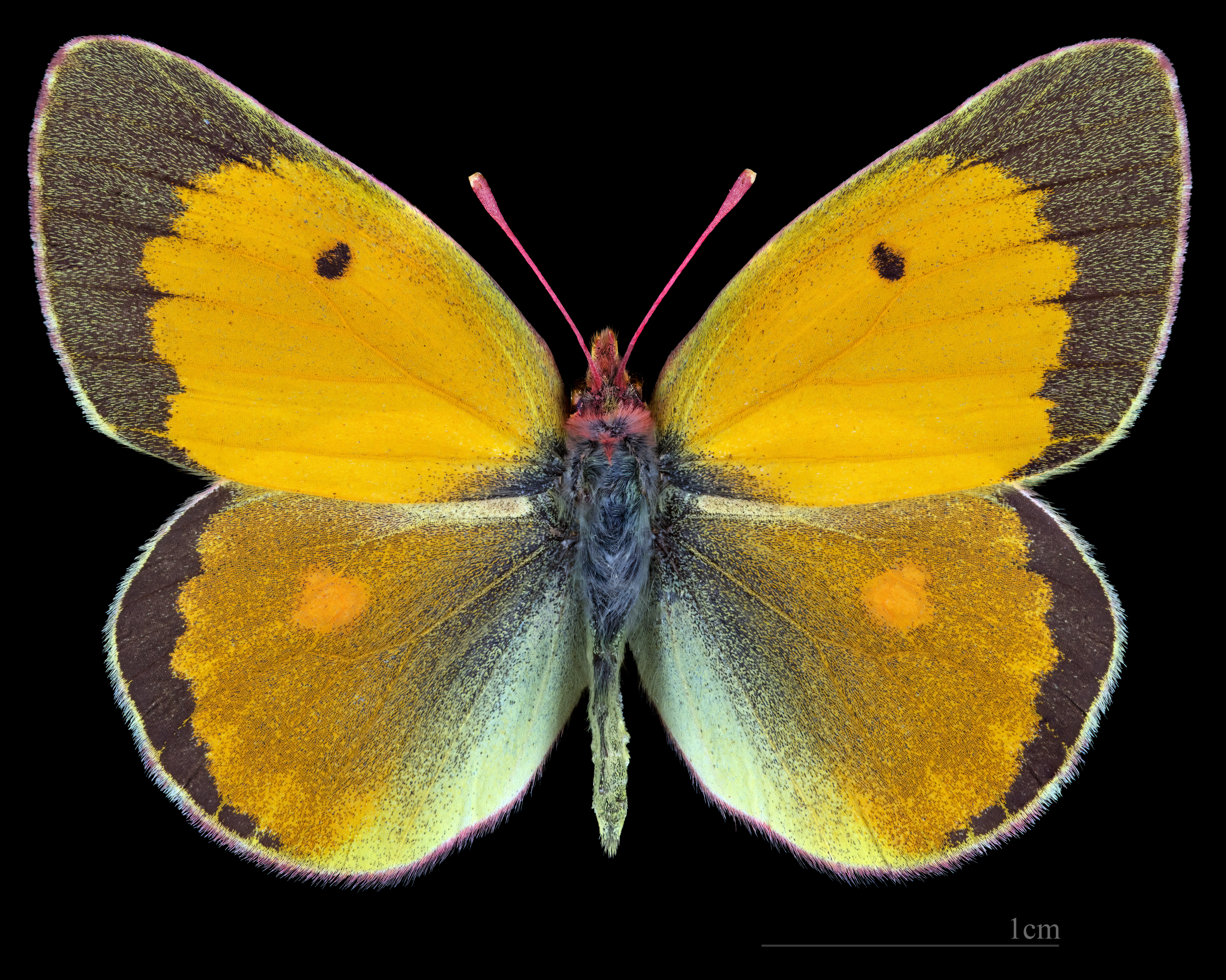
Colias myrmidone, male

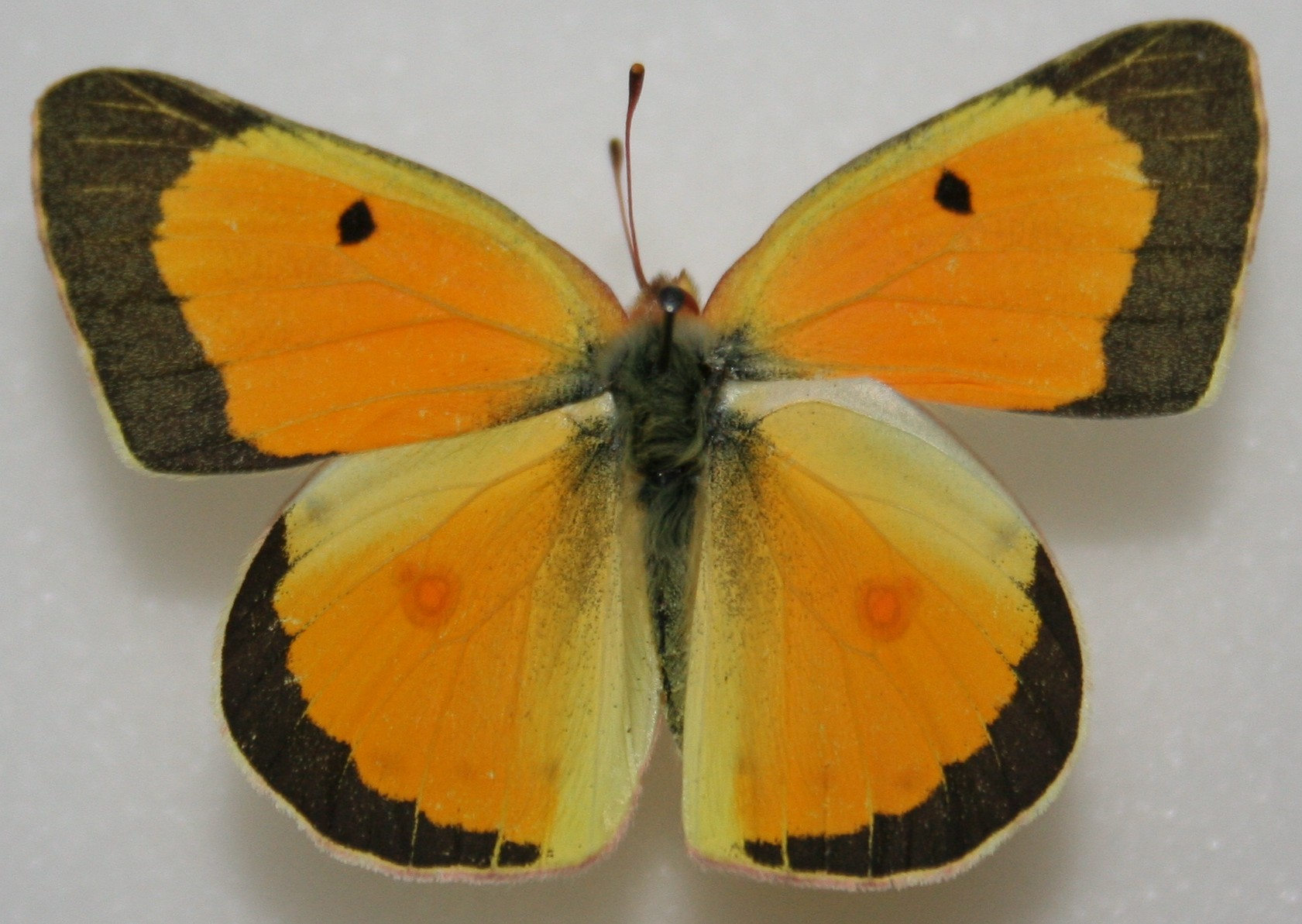
Colias eurytheme, male

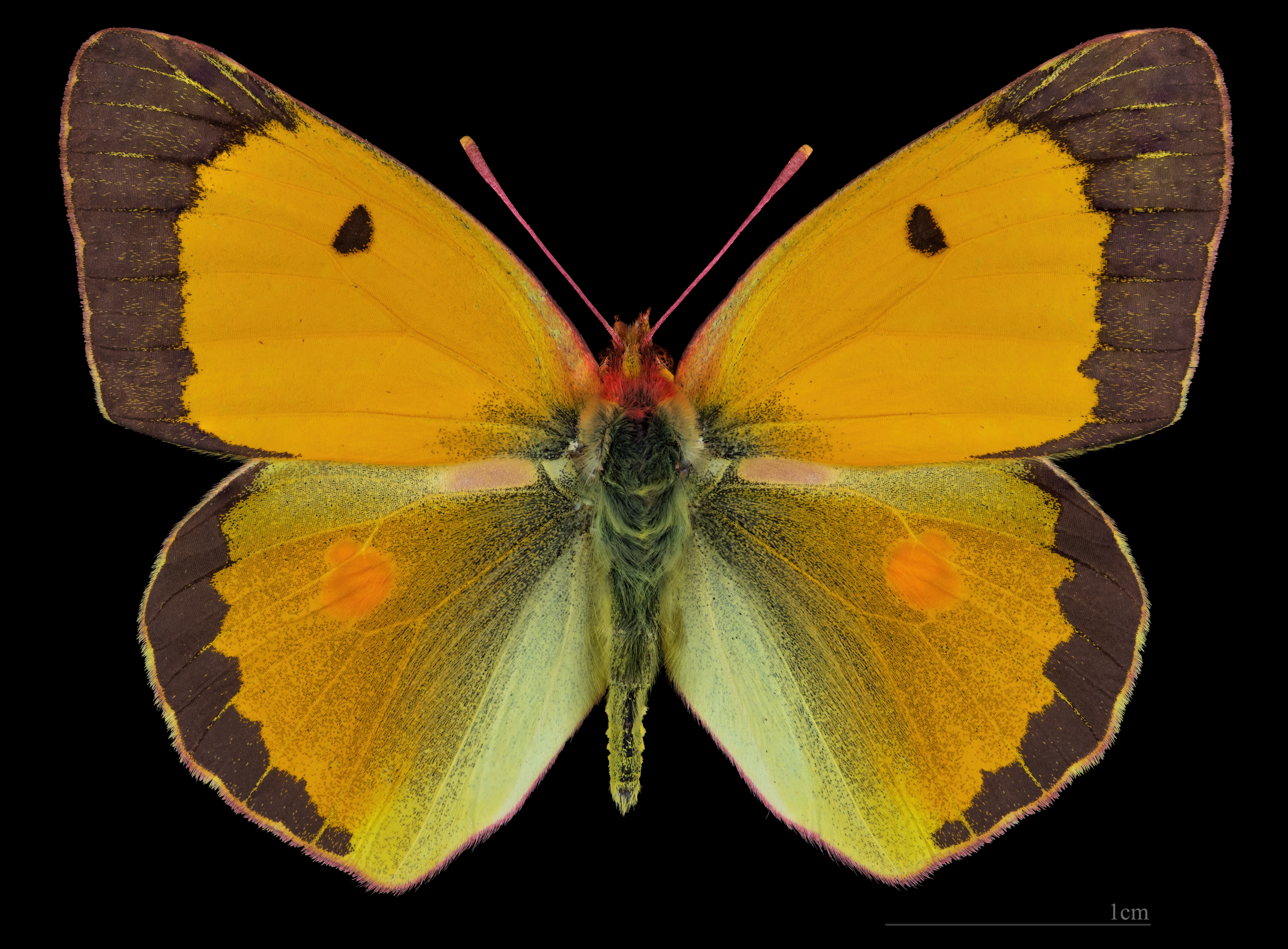
Colias croceus, male

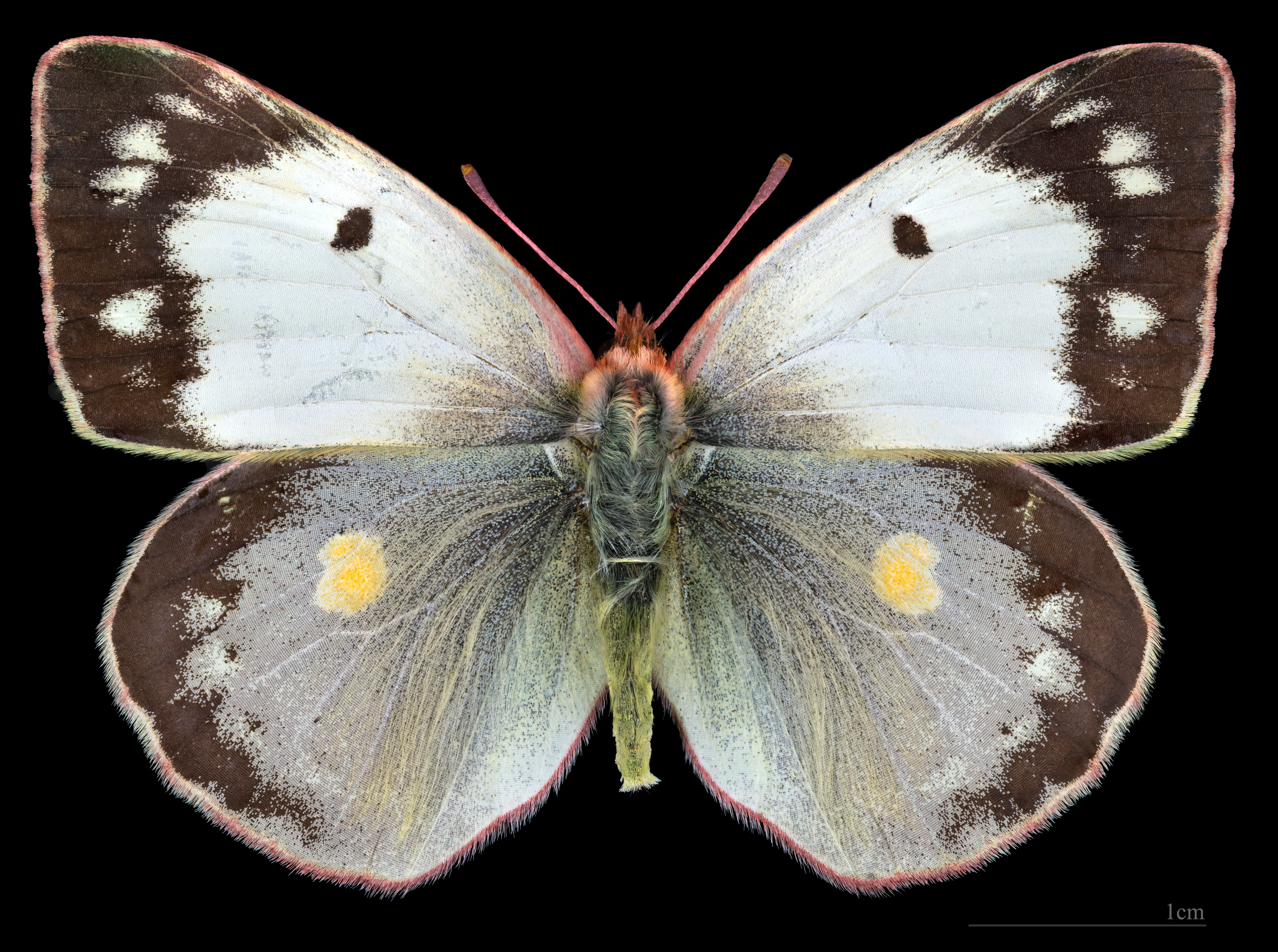
Colias croceus f. helice

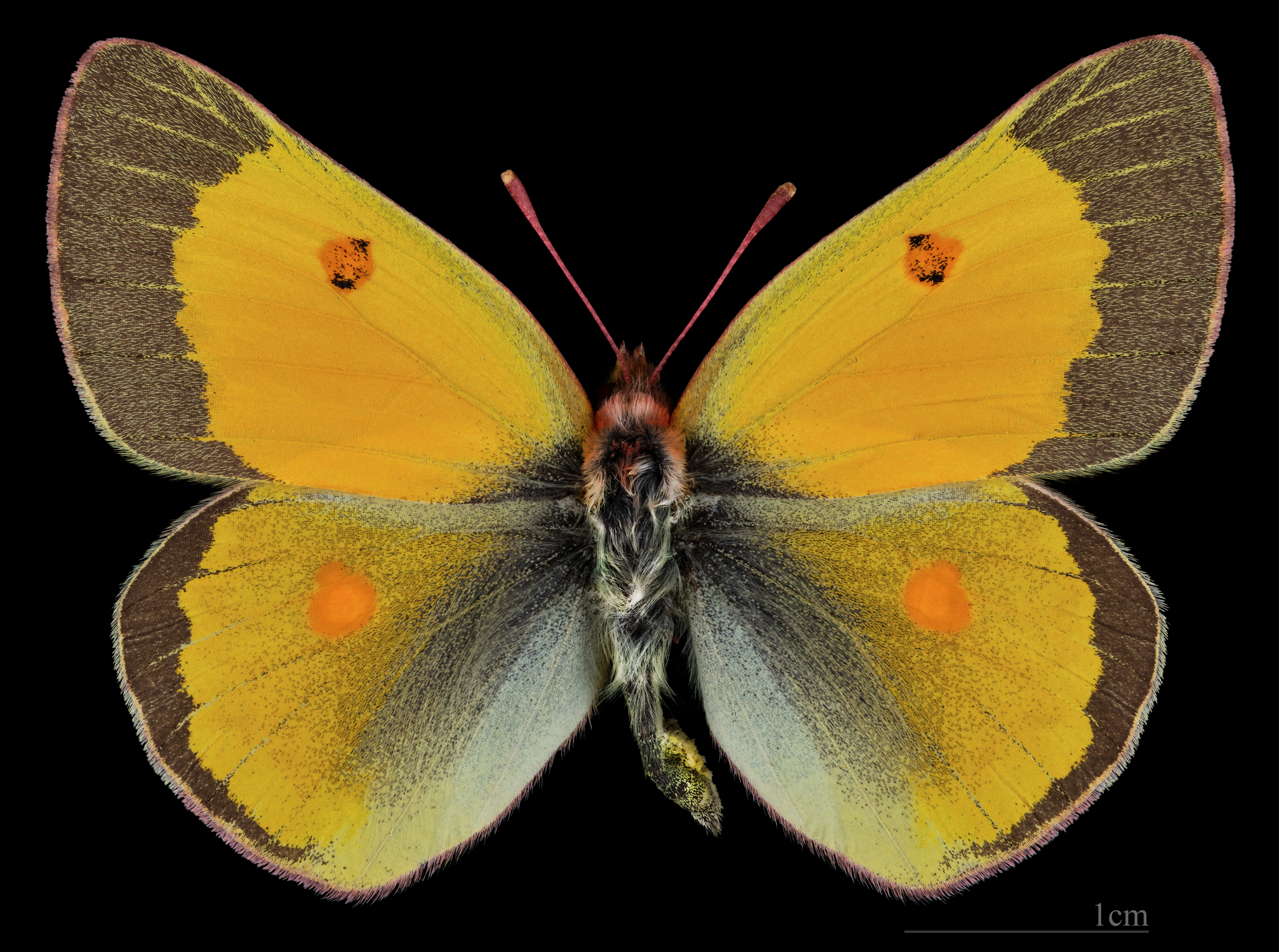
Colias chrysotheme, male

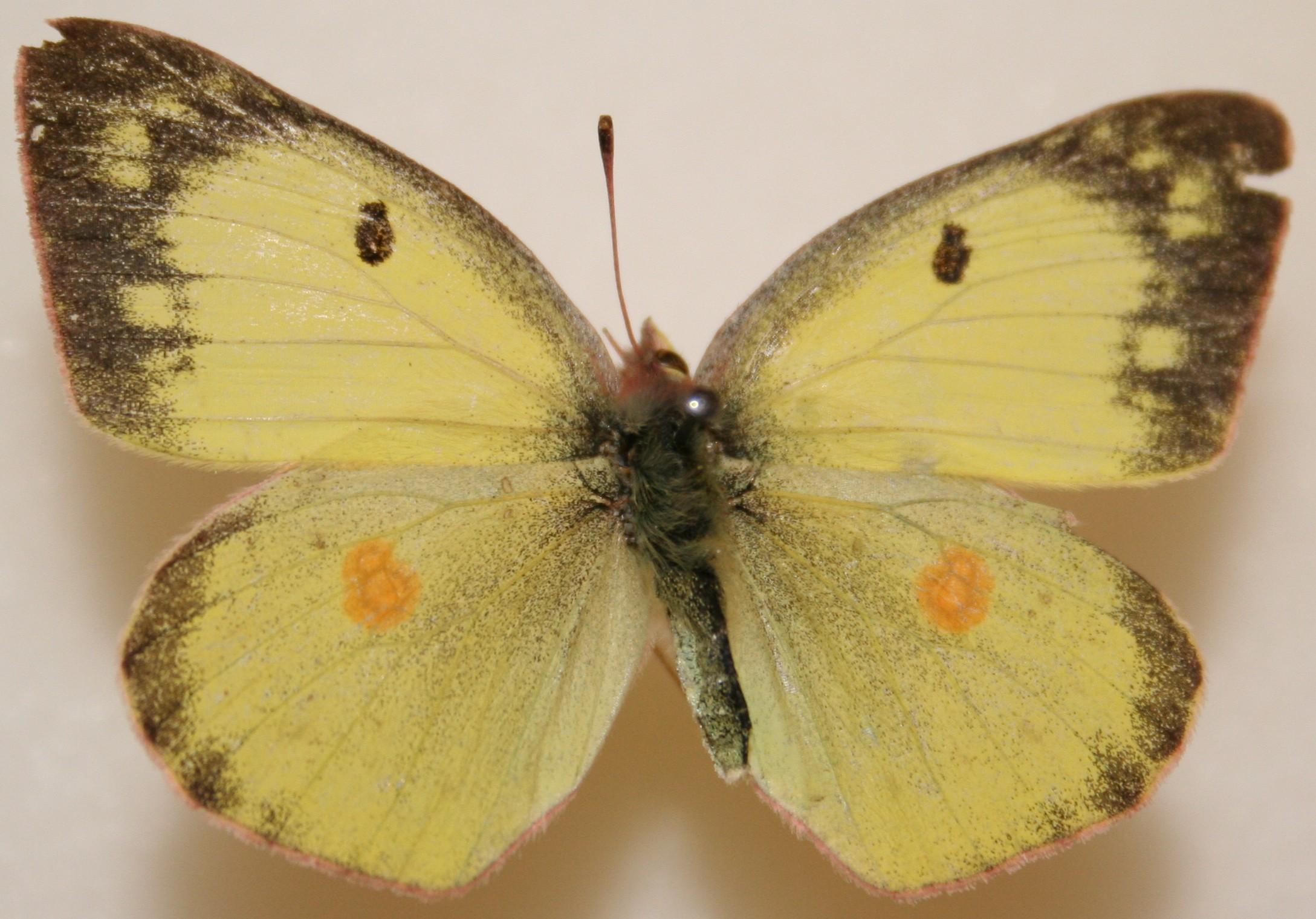
Colias philodice, female

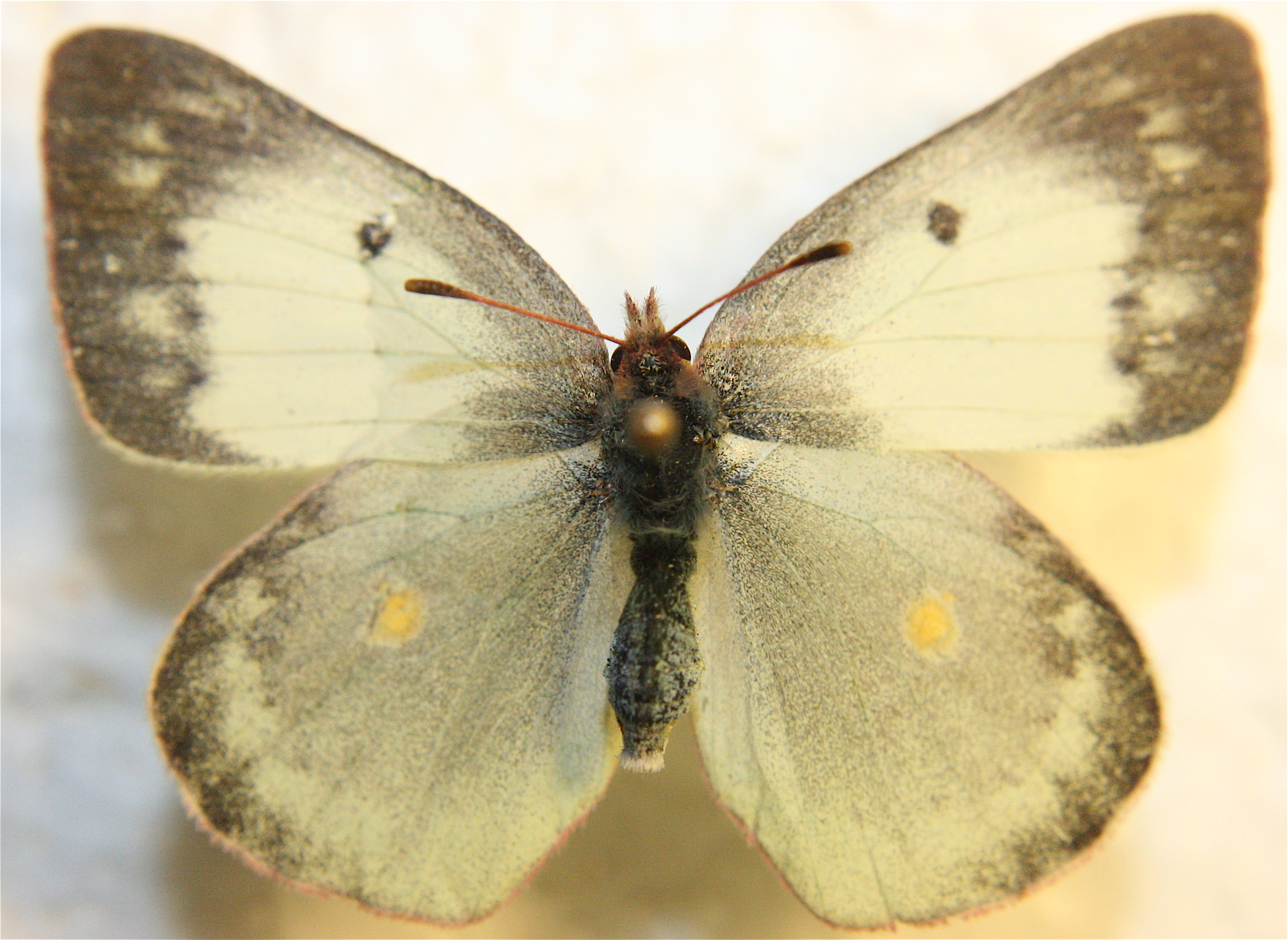
Colias philodice f. alba, female

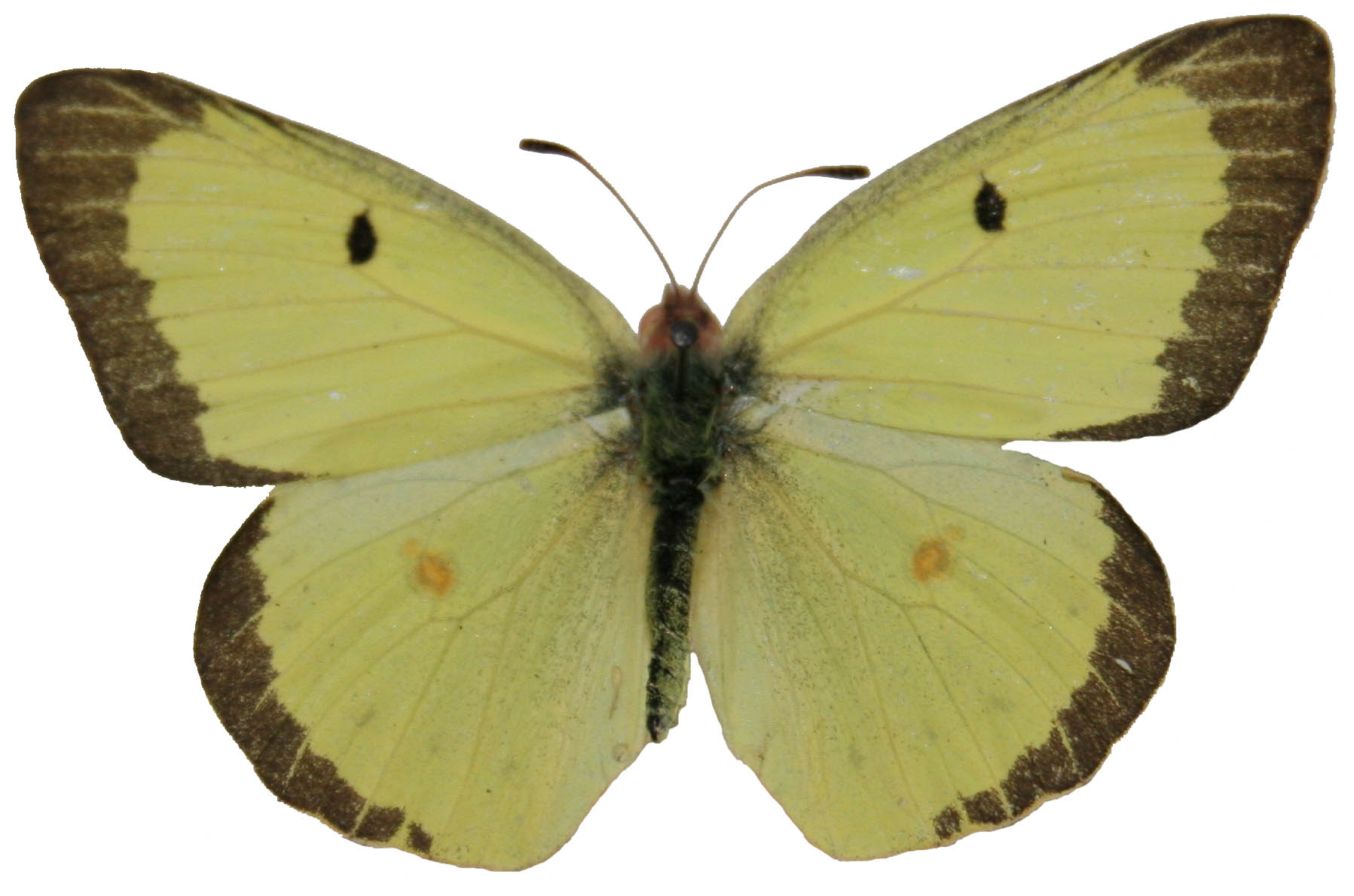
Colias philodice, male

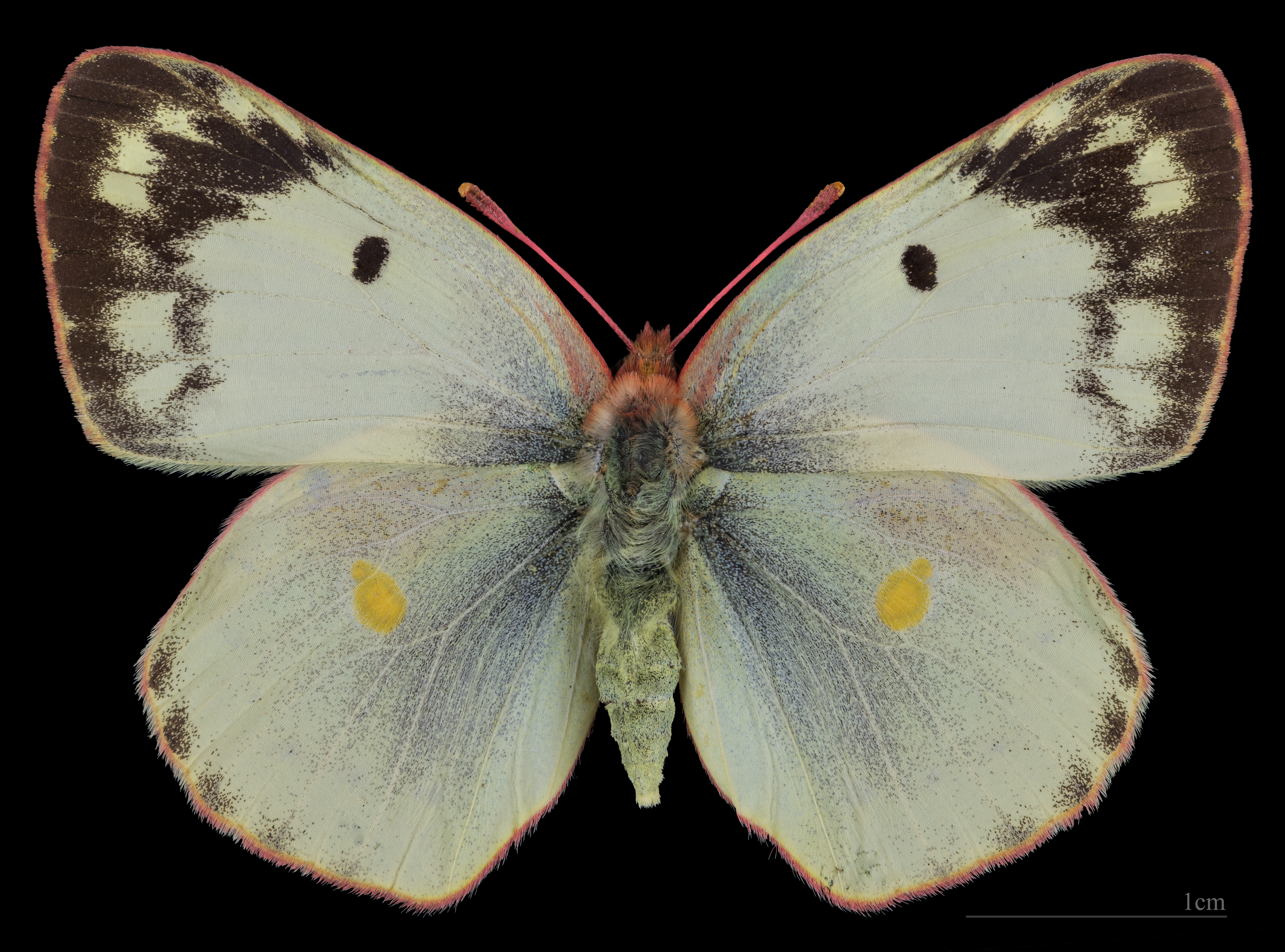
Colias alfacariensis, female

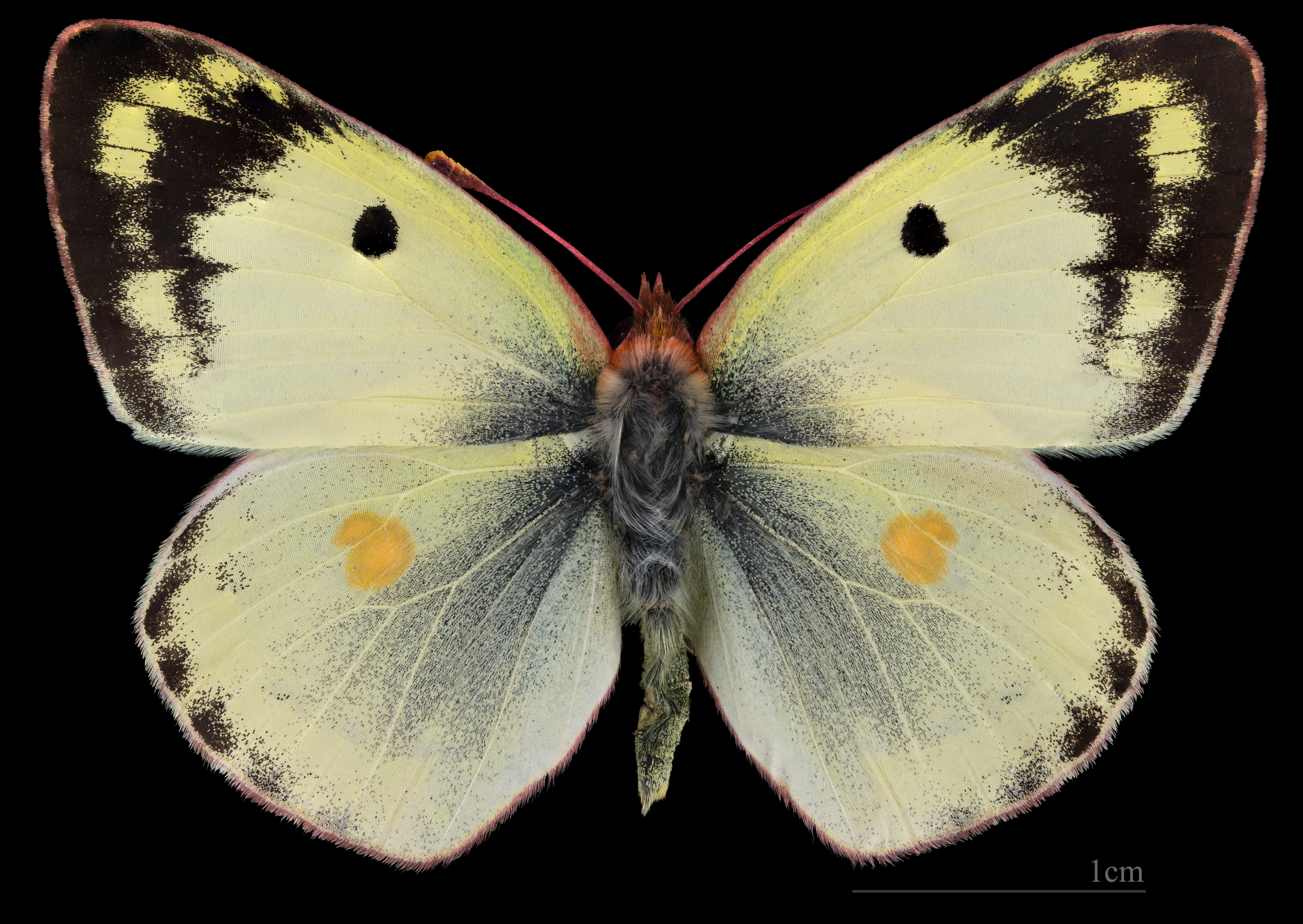
Colias hyale, male

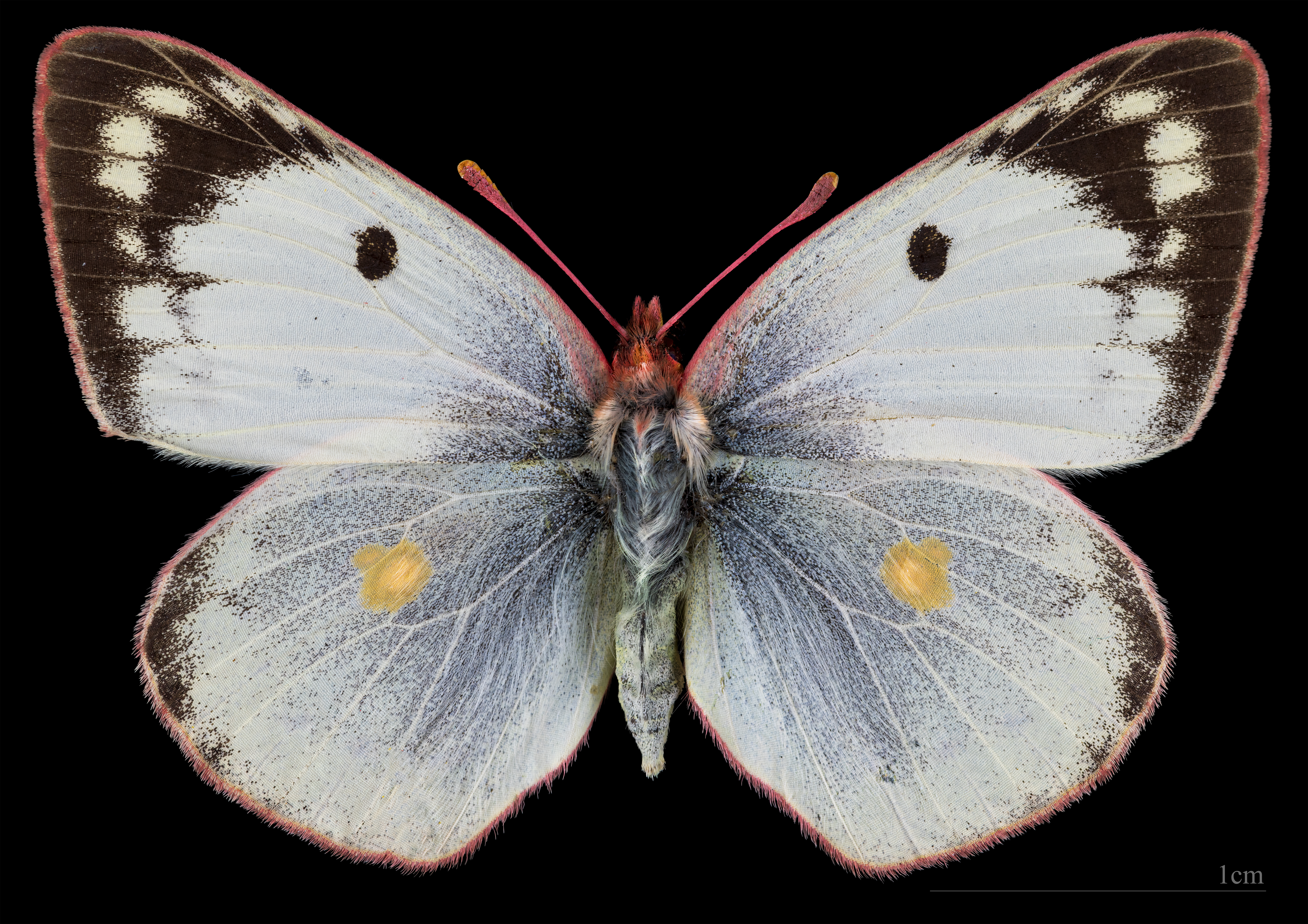
Colias hyale, female

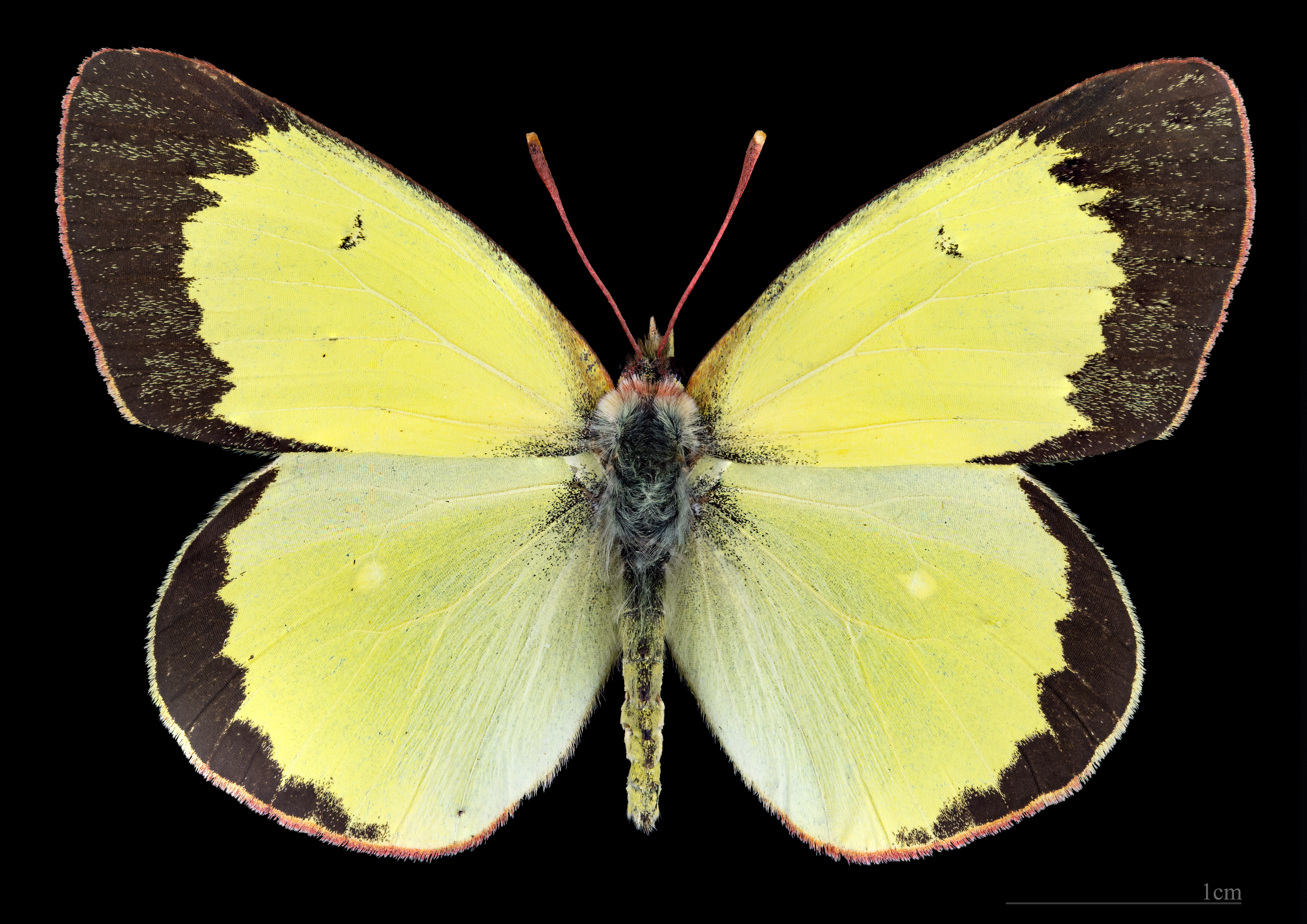
Colias palaeno, male

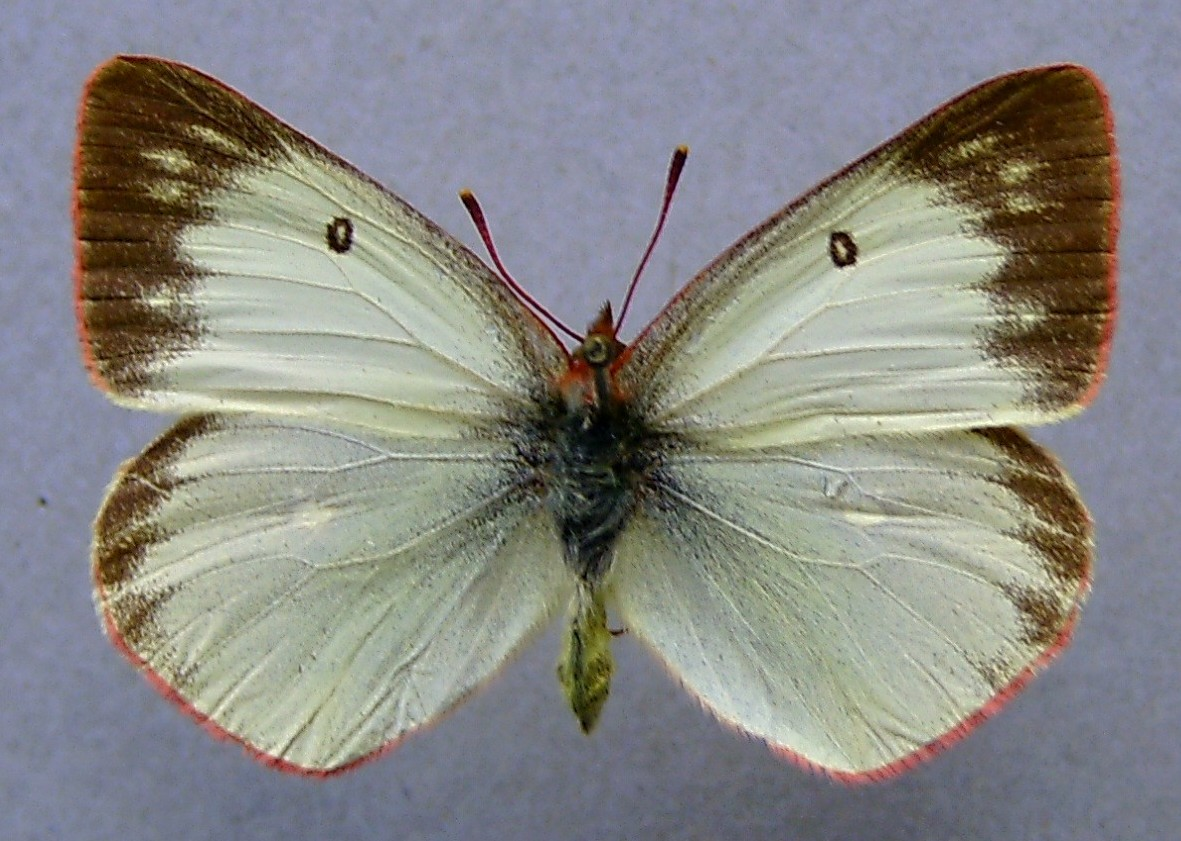
Colias palaeno, female

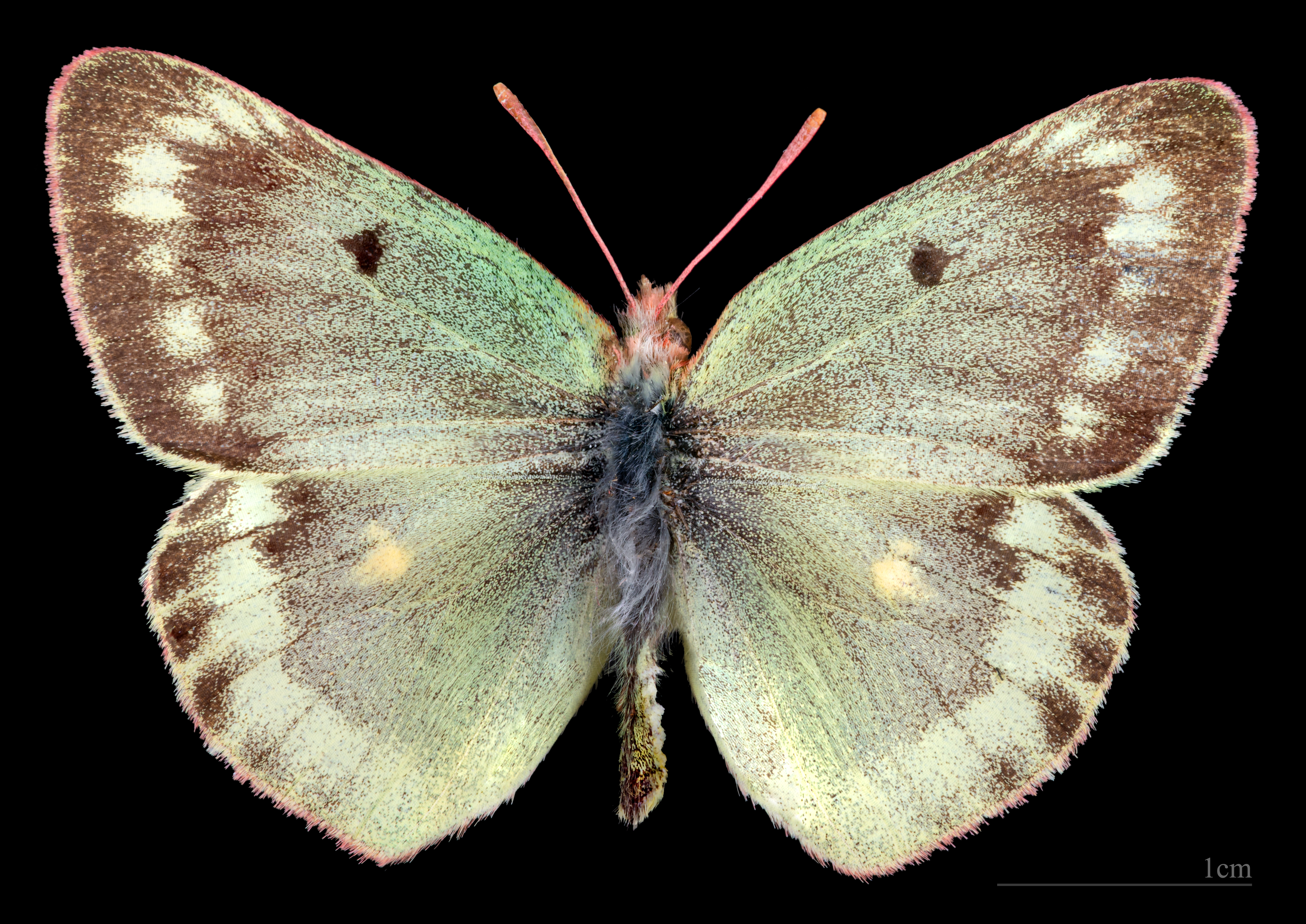
Colias phicomone, male

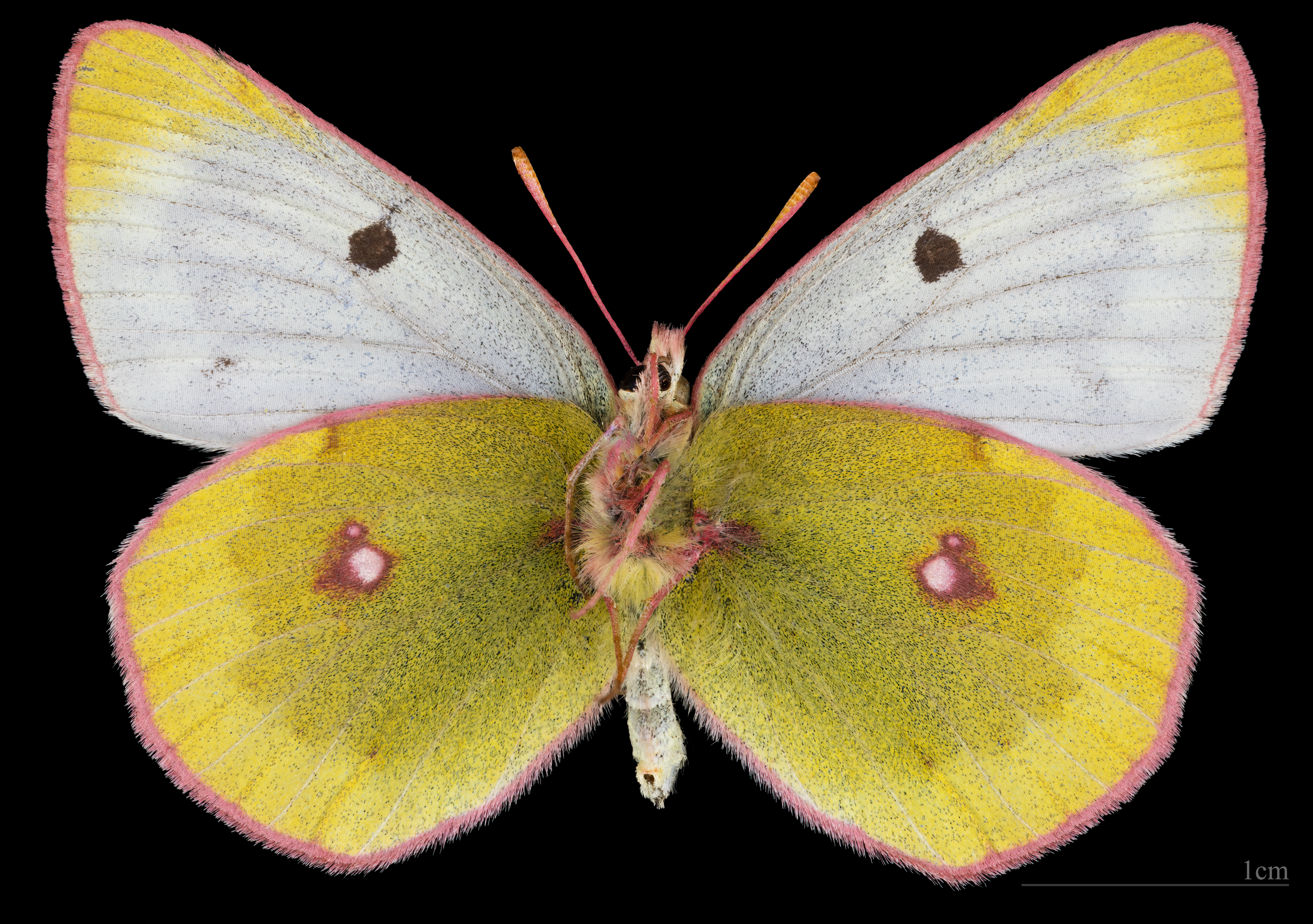
Colias phicomone, female
