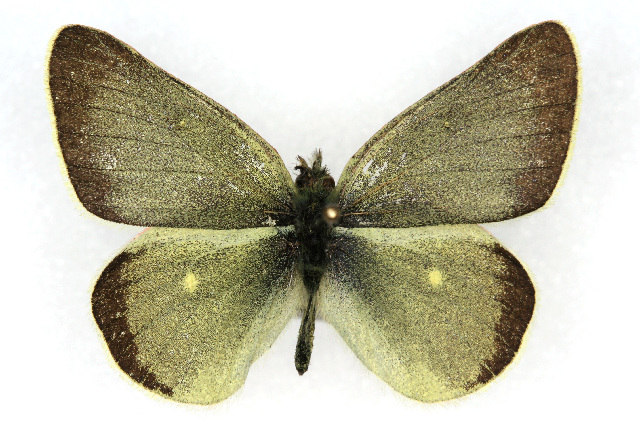

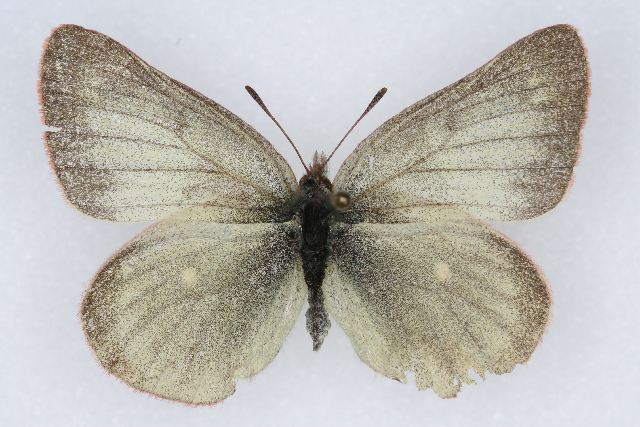

Conservation status
- Vulnerable (NatureServe)

Scientific classification
- Kingdom: Animalia
- Phylum: Arthropoda
- Class: Insecta
- Order: Lepidoptera
- Family: Pieridae
- Genus: Colias
- Species: C. behrii

Binomial name
- Colias behrii W.H. Edwards, 1866

Synonyms
- Eurymus behrii; Eurymus behrii f. canescens Comstock, 1925

= Colias behrii =

Species of butterfly

Colias behrii, the Behr's sulphur or Sierra green sulfur, is a butterfly in the family Pieridae. It is endemic to California's Sierra Nevada from Tuolumne County south to Tulare County.

The wingspan is 35–42 mm (1.4–1.7 in). Adults are on wing from July to August. They feed on flower nectar.

The larvae feed on Vaccinium species and Gentiana newberryi.
