= Colias regia =

- d

Scientific classification
- Kingdom: Animalia
- Phylum: Arthropoda
- Clade: Pancrustacea
- Class: Insecta
- Order: Lepidoptera
- Family: Pieridae
- Genus: Colias
- Species: C. regia

Binomial name
- Colias regia Grum-Grshimailo, 1887

Species of butterfly

Colias regia is a butterfly in the family Pieridae. It is found in the East Palearctic (Kyrgyzstan west into Tajikistan, Tian Shan, and northern China).

== Description ==
C. regia Gr.-Grsh. (26 d), from Southern Fergana, is magnificently golden red, with a very feeble violet sheen in the male and a stronger gloss in the female; the black marginal band not very broad, dusted with yellow, the middle spot of the forewing black, that of the hindwing red and inconspicuous. In the female the black distal margin is somewhat broader, bearing yellow spots at the apex of the forewing, the hindwing having small red obsolescent spots in the posterior portion of the band. The underside of the male is beautifully greenish yellow, with few markings, a black middle spot on the forewing and a brownish-edged one of mother-of-pearl colour on the hindwing; the underside of the hindwing darker in the female, the forewing being proximally beautifully golden red.

== Taxonomy ==
Accepted as a species by Josef Grieshuber & Gerardo Lamas
