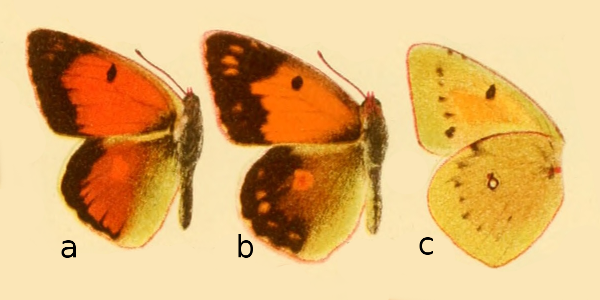
- a. male, b. female, c. underside

Scientific classification
- Kingdom: Animalia
- Phylum: Arthropoda
- Class: Insecta
- Order: Lepidoptera
- Family: Pieridae
- Genus: Colias
- Species: C. romanovi

Binomial name
- Colias romanovi Grum-Grshimailo, 1885

= Colias romanovi =

Species of butterfly

Colias romanovi is a butterfly in the family Pieridae. It is found in the eastern Palearctic realm (Kyrgyzstan west into Tajikistan, Tian Shan, and northern China).

== Description ==
C. romanovi Gr.-Grsh. (26 c) occurs in Southern Fergana. Its golden red colour renders it one of the finest species of the genus. The broad black marginal band of the forewing of the male is usually without spots, but bears sometimes a row of contiguous ill-defined yellow subapical spots, there being also yellowish submarginal spots on the hindwing; this form is the ab. maculata of dealers (26c). In the female the ground colour is paler, the slightly yellow-spotted marginal band being broader and the hindwing darkened, the large orange-red middle spot contrasting sharply. The underside is yellow, the proximal portion of the forewing light orange-red, the submarginal spots of the forewing, which are sometimes absent, are blackish, while those of the hindwing are brownish; the forewing bears a large, pale-centred middle spot and the hindwing a large red-edged double spot of the colour of mother-of-pearl.

== Subspecies ==
- Colias romanovi romanovi
- Colias romanovi seravschana Lukhtanov, 1999

== Taxonomy ==
Accepted as a species by Josef Grieshuber & Gerardo Lamas
