= Colias erschoffi =

Scientific classification
- Kingdom: Animalia
- Phylum: Arthropoda
- Clade: Pancrustacea
- Class: Insecta
- Order: Lepidoptera
- Family: Pieridae
- Genus: Colias
- Species: C. erschoffi

Binomial name
- Colias erschoffi Alphéraky, 1881

Species of butterfly

Colias erschoffi is a butterfly in the family Pieridae. It is found in Tien-Shan.

== Description ==
Colias erschoffi is a pretty yellow species, in which also the male bears a complete row of submarginal spots, the sexes therefore being very similar; the hindwing is greenish yellow, with sharply defined yellow submarginal band and a large reddish yellow middle spot which has a light centre and is distally produced into a point.

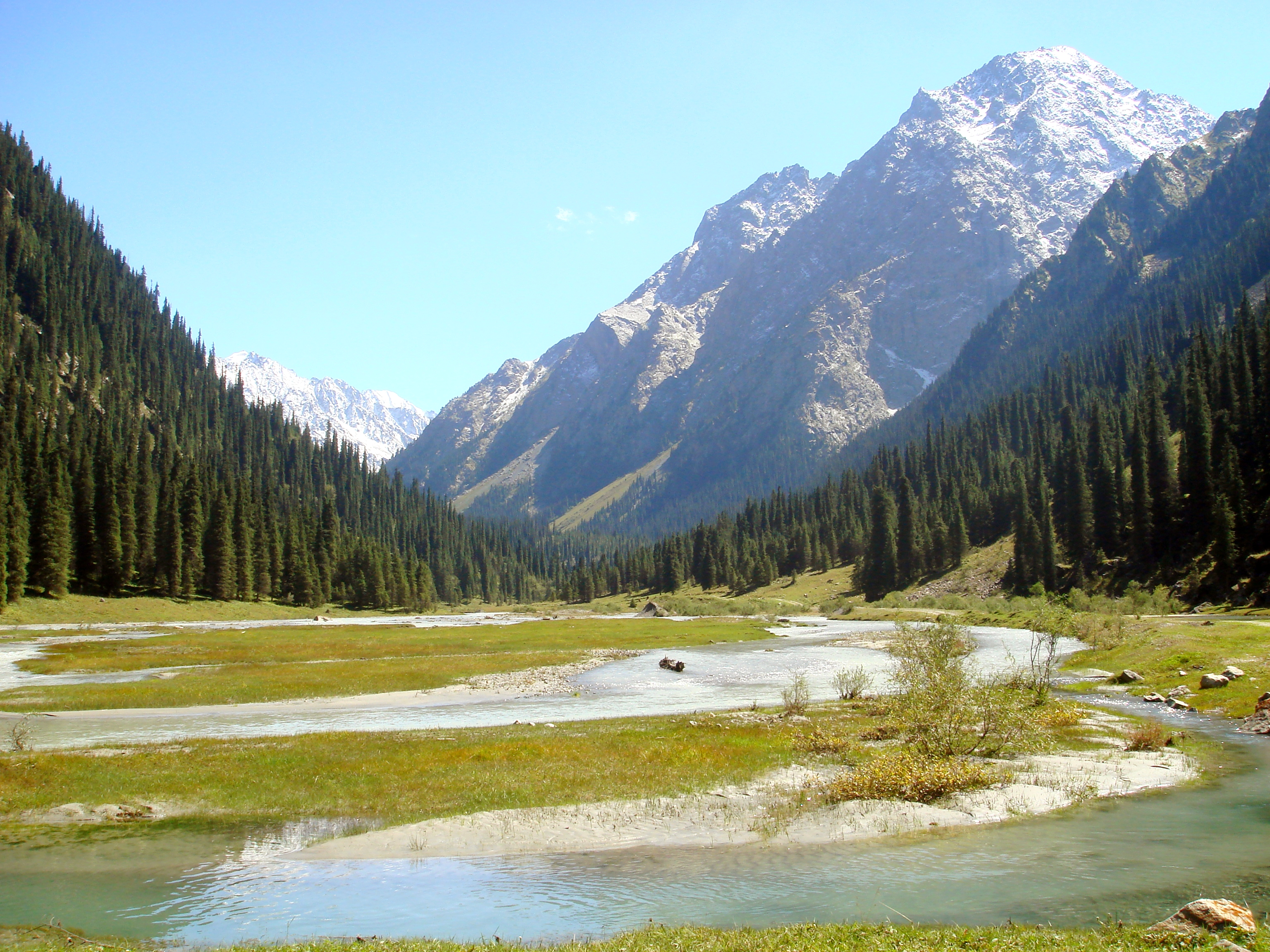
Montane habitat in Kyrgyzstan

== Biology ==
Flies from the middle of May till July and August, at elevations of 5,000 to 7,000 feet (1,500 to 2,100 m).
