= List of butterflies of China (Pieridae) =

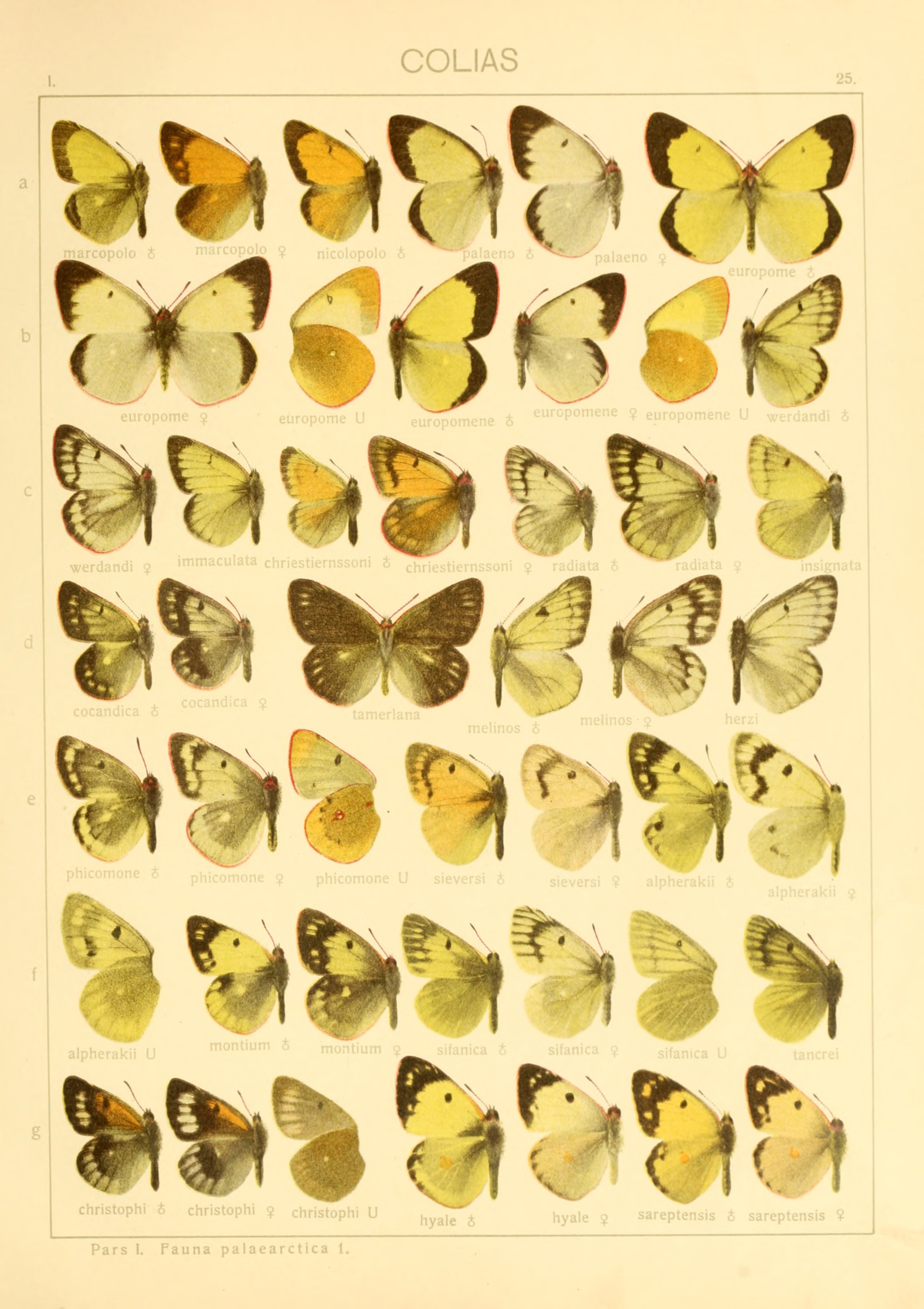
Palearctic Colias in Adalbert Seitz's Die Großschmetterlinge der Erde (1900-1909)

This is a list of the butterflies of China belonging to the family Pieridae and an index to the species articles. This forms part of the full list of butterflies of China. 438 species or subspecies of Pieridae are recorded from China.

== Pieridae ==
genus: Anthocharis

- Anthocharis cardamines (Linnaeus, 1758) China

A. c. alexandra (Hemming, 1933) Tian-Shan
A. c. koreana Matsumura, 1937 Amur, Ussuri

- Anthocharis bieti (Oberthür, 1884) China, Tibet

A. b. tsangpoana (Riley, 1928) Tsangpo

- Anthocharis bambusarum Oberthür, 1876
- Anthocharis scolymus (Butler, 1866)
- Anthocharis thibetana (Oberthür, 1886) West China

genus: Aporia

- Aporia crataegi (Linnaeus, 1758)

A. c. tianschanica Rühl, [1893] Tian Shan
A. c. pseudohippia Verity, 1911 Tibet
A. c. ussurica Kardakoff, 1928 Amur, Ussuri

- Aporia howarthi Bernardi, 1961 Tibet, Lilung Valley
- Aporia bieti (Oberthür, 1884)

A. b. bieti (Oberthür, 1884) West China, Tibet
A. b. gregoryi Watkins, 1927 Yunnan
A. b. transiens Alphéraky, 1897 Tibet

- Aporia hippia (Bremer, 1861)

A. h. hippia (Bremer, 1861) Amur, Ussuri
A. h. thibetana Grum-Grshimailo, 1893 Manchuria

- Aporia procris Leech, 1890

A. p. procris Leech, 1890 North Yunnan, Sichuan
A. p. draesekei (Bang-Haas, 1927) Yunnan
A. p. sinensis (Bang-Haas, 1927) Kansu
A. p. nyanchuensis Yoshino, 1998 Tibet

- Aporia leucodice (Eversmann, 1843)

A. l. illumina (Grum-Grshimailo, 1890) Tian Shan

- Aporia martineti (Oberthür, 1884)

A. m. martineti (Oberthür, 1884) Yunnan, Sichuan
A. m. konbogyandaensis Yoshino, 1998 Tibet

- Aporia intercostata Bang-Haas, 1927 North China
- Aporia potanini Alphéraky, 1892 West China
- Aporia lhamo (Oberthür, 1893) Yunnan
- Aporia goutellei (Oberthür, 1886)

A. g. tsinglingica Verity, 1911 Yunnan
A. g. extrema South, 1913 Tibet

- Aporia genestieri (Oberthür, 1902) Yunnan
- Aporia delavayi (Oberthür, 1890)

A. d. delavayi (Oberthür, 1890) North Yunnan, Sichuan, East Tibet
A. d. minschani Bang-Haas, 1933
A. d. dayiensis Yoshino, 1998 Sichuan

- Aporia larraldei (Oberthür, 1876)

A. l. larraldei (Oberthür, 1876) Sichuan
A. l. nutans (Oberthür, 1892) Yunnan
A. l. melania (Oberthür, 1892) Sichuan

- Aporia kaolinkonensis Yoshino, 1997
- Aporia gigantea Koiwaya, 1993 Sichuan
- Aporia acraea (Oberthür, 1885)

A. a. lotis (Leech, 1890) Sichuan
A. a. wolongensis Yoshino, 1995 Sichuan

- Aporia tayiensis Yoshino, 1995 Sichuan
- Aporia largeteaui (Oberthür, 1881)

A. l. kuangtungensis Mell, 1935 China
A. l. pacifica (Mell, 1943) South China
A. l. schmackeri (Mell, 1943) South China

- Aporia oberthuri (Leech, 1890) China
- Aporia hastata (Oberthür, 1892) Yunnan
- Aporia joubini (Oberthür, 1913) China
- Aporia monbeigi (Oberthür, 1917)

A. m. monbeigi (Oberthür, 1917) North Yunnan (Weixi)
A. m. meiliensis Yoshino, 1995 North Yunnan (Dequin)

- Aporia harrietae (de Nicéville, [1893])

A. h. baileyi South, 1913 North Yunnan

- Aporia agathon (Gray, 1831)

A. a. agathon (Gray, 1831) Southwest China
A. a. lemoulti Bernardi, 1945 Sichuan
A. a. bifurcata Tytler, 1939 Yunnan
A. a. omotoi Yoshino, 2003 North Yunnan

- Aporia nishimurai Koiwaya, 1989 Sichuan
- Aporia shinnooka Yoshino, 2001 Hupei
- Aporia kamei Koiwaya, 1989
- Aporia kanekoi Koiwaya, 1989

genus: Appias

- Appias albina (Boisduval, 1836)

A. a. darada (C. & R. Felder, [1865]) Hainan, West China

- Appias paulina (Cramer, [1777])

A. p. adamsoni (Moore, [1905]) South West China

- Appias indra (Moore, 1857)

A. i. thronion (Fruhstorfer, 1910 Yunnan
A. i. menandrus Fruhstorfer, 1910 Hainan, South. China
A. i. aristoxemus Fruhstorfer, 1908

- Appias libythea (Fabricius, 1775)
- Appias lyncida (Cramer, [1777])

A. l. formosana (Wallace, 1866) Taiwan
A. l. inornata Moore, 1878 Hainan, South. China

- Appias lalage (Doubleday, 1842)

A. l. lalage Yunnan
A. l. lageloides (Crowley, 1900) Hainan

- Appias lalassis Grose-Smith, 1887

A. l. lalassis Yuunan

- Appias nero (Fabricius, 1793)

genus: Baltia

- Baltia butleri Alphéraky, 1889

genus: Catopsilia

- Catopsilia pomona (Fabricius, 1775)
- Catopsilia pyranthe (Linnaeus, 1758)
- Catopsilia scylla (Linnaeus, 1763)
- Catopsilia florella (Fabricius, 1775)

genus: Cepora

- Cepora nerissa Fabricius, 1775
- Cepora wui Chou, Zhang & Wang, 2001
- Cepora nadina (Lucas, 1852)
- Cepora judith (Fabricius, 1787)

genus: Colias

- Colias alfacariensis Ribbe, 1905
- Colias hyale (Linnaeus, 1758)

C. h. alta Staudinger, 1886 Tian-Shan
C. h. novasinensis Reissinger, 1989 Gansu

- Colias erate (Esper, 1805)

C. e. amdensis Verity, 1911 Qinghai, Gansu, Sichuan
C. e. sinensis Verity, 1911 Yunnan, Manchuria
C. e. poliographus Motschulsky, 1860 Amur, Ussuri, Sakhalin, Tian Shan

- Colias tyche (Böber, 1812) Amur, Mongoli
- Colias palaeno (Linnaeus, 1761)

C. p. orientalis Staudinger, 1892 Amur

- Colias lada Grum-Grshimailo, 1891 Tibet, Amdo, Gansu
- Colias montium Oberthür, 1886 Tibet, Sichuan

C. m. viridis Bang-Haas, 1915 Qinghai
C. m. longto Evans, 1924 Tibet
C. m. fasciata Kocman, 1999 Qinghai

- Colias sifanica Grum-Grshimailo, 1891

C. s. sifanica Grum-Grshimailo, 1891 Amdo, Qinghai, Gansu
C. s. herculeana Bollow, 1930 Gansu

- Colias aegidii Verhulst, 1990 Gansu, Qinghai
- Colias nebulosa Oberthür, 1894

C. n. nebulosa Oberthür, 1894 Sichuan
C. n. karoensis Hoshiai & Rose, 1998 Tibet
C. n. niveata Verity, [1909] Qinghai
C. n. pugo Evans, 1924 Tibet
C. n. sungpani Bang-Haas, 1927 Sichuan, Gansu
C. n. richthofeni O. Bang-Haas, 1927 Qilian Mountains

- Colias cocandica Erschoff, 1874

C. c. maja Grum-Grshimailo, 1891 Tian Shan
C. c. pljushtchi Verhulst, 2000 Tian Shan

- Colias tamerlana Staudinger, 1897

C. t. tamerlana Staudinger, 1897 Xinjiang

- Colias tibetana Riley, 1923 Tibet
- Colias grumi Alphéraky, 1897

C. g. aljinshana Huang & Murayama, 1992 Xinjiang

- Colias ladakensis C. Felder & R. Felder, 1865 Tibet
- Colias nina Fawcett, 1904 Tibet

C. n. nina Fawcett, 1904
C. n. hingstoni Riley, 1923
C. n. tsurpuana Grieshuber, 1996

- Colias berylla Fawcett, 1904 Tibet
- Colias adelaidae Verhulst, 1991
- Colias arida Alphéraky, 1889 Tibet, West China

C. a. arida Alphéraky, 1889
C. a. cakana Rose & Schulte, 1992
C. a. muetingi Rose & Schulte, 1992
C. a. wanda Grum-Grshimailo, 1893

- Colias baeckeri Kotzsch, 1930
- Colias stoliczkana Moore, 1878

C. s. stoliczkana Moore, 1878 Tibet
C. s. yangguifei Huang & Murayama, 1992 Xinjiang

- Colias staudingeri Alphéraky, 1881

C. s. emivittata Verity, 1911 Tien Shan

- Colias felderi Grum-Grshimailo, 1891 Tibet, China
- Colias leechi Grum-Grshimailo, 1893
- Colias regia Grum-Grshimailo, 1887 Tien Shan
- Colias romanovi Grum-Grshimailo, 1885 Tien Shan
- Colias heos (Herbst, 1792) Mongolia, Ussuri, Southeast China
- Colias diva Grum-Grshimailo, 1891 Tibet, West China
- Colias erschoffi Alphéraky, 1881 Tien Shan
- Colias wiskotti Staudinger, 1882

C. w. draconis Grum-Grshimailo, 1891 Tien Shan

- Colias chrysotheme (Esper, 1781) Northeast China
- Colias thisoa Ménétriés, 1832 China

C. t. urumtsiensis Verity, 1909 Tian Shan

- Colias fieldii Ménétriés, 1855

C. f. fieldii Ménétriés, 1855 Yunnan
C. f. chinensis Verity, 1909 Ussuri

- Colias sieversi Grum-Grshimailo, 1887
- Colias thrasibulus Fruhstorfer, 1908
- Colias dubia Fawcett, 1906
- Colias viluiensis Ménétries, 1859

genus: Delias

- Delias acalis Godart, 1819
- Delias pasithoe (Linnaeus, 1767)
- Delias hyparete (Linnaeus, 1758)
- Delias lativitta Leech, 1893
- Delias subnubila Leech, 1893
- Delias wilemani Jordan, 1925
- Delias belladonna (Fabricius, 1793)
- Delias sanaca (Moore, 1857)
- Delias berinda (Moore, 1872)
- Delias agostina Hewitson, 1852
- Delias descombesi Boisduval, 1836

genus: Dercas

- Dercas lycorias Doubleday 1842
- Dercas verhuelli (Hoeven, 1839)

genus: Eurema

- Eurema ada (Distant & Pryer, 1887)
- Eurema andersoni (Moore, 1886)

E. a. sadanobui Shirôzu & Yata, 1982 Yunnan

- Eurema blanda (Boisduval, 1836)

E. b. hylama Corbet & Pendlebury Hainan
E. b. rileyi Corbet & Pendlebury South China

- Eurema brigitta (Stoll, [1780])

E. b. hainana (Moore, 1878) Hainan
E. b. rubella (Wallace, 1867) South China
E. b. yunnana (Mell, 1943) Yunnan

- Eurema hecabe (Linnaeus, 1758)

E. h. albina Huang, 1994 Fujian

- Eurema laeta (Boisduval, 1836)

E. l. sikkima (Moore, [1906]) Hainan

genus: Gandaca

- Gandaca harina (Horsfield, 1829)

genus: Gonepteryx

- Gonepteryx rhamni (Linnaeus, 1758)

G. r. tianshanica Nekrutenko, 1970 Tian Shan

- Gonepteryx mahaguru Gistel, 1857 East China

G. m. alvinda (Blanchard, 1871) Tibet, Yunnan

- Gonepteryx maxima Butler, 1885 Northeast China

G. m. amurensis Graeser, 1888 Amur, Ussuri

- Gonepteryx acuminata C. Felder & R. Felder, 1862 Ning-Po
- Gonepteryx amintha Blanchard, 1871

G. a. limonia Mell, 1943 Ussuri, Yunnan
G. a. thibetana Nekrutenko, 1968 Tibet

genus: Ixias

- Ixias pyrene Linnaeus 1764

genus: Leptidea

- Leptidea morsei Fenton, [1882] Ussuri, North China
- Leptidea amurensis Ménétriés, 1859
- Leptidea gigantea (Leech, 1890)
- Leptidea lactea Lorkovic, 1950 Tapaischan, China
- Leptidea serrata Lee, 1955

genus: Leptosia

- Leptosia nina (Fabricius, 1793)

genus: Mesapia

- Mesapia peloria (Hewitson, 1853)

genus: Pareronia

- Pareronia valeria (Cramer, [1776])

genus: Pieris

- Pieris brassicae (Linnaeus, 1758) China

P. b. nepalensis Gray, 1846 Yunnan
P. b. ottonis Röber, 1907 Tian Shan

- Pieris naganum (Moore, 1884)

P. n. cisseis Leech, 1890 Houpe, Tsekiang, Honan, Fukien, Guangxi, Guangdong, Hainan

- Pieris napi (Linnaeus, 1758)

P. n. banghaasi Sheljuzhko, 1910 Tian Shan
P. n. muchei Eitschberger, [1984] Tian Shan

- Pieris bryoniae (Hübner, [1790-1793])

P. b. bryonides Sheljuzhko, 1910 Tian Shan

- Pieris narina Verity, 1908 Tian Shan
- Pieris ochsenheimeri Staudinger, 1886 Tian Shan
- Pieris dulcinea (Butler, 1882)

P. d. dulcinea (Butler, 1882) Amur, Ussuri

- Pieris melete Ménétriés, 1857

P. m. orientis Oberthür, 1880 Ussuri
P. m. mandarina Leech, 1893 North China
P. m. melaina Röber, 1907 Tibet, South China
P. m. alpestris Verity, 1908 Sichuan
P. m. australis Verity, 1911 Yunnan

- Pieris canidia (Linnaeus, 1768) West China, Tibet

P. c. minima Verity, 1908 Tibet
P. c. mars Bang-Haas, 1927 Kansu
P. c. indica Evans, 1926 Yunnan

- Pieris extensa Poujade, 1888 West China

P. e. latouchei Mell, 1939 Fukien

- Pieris rapae (Linnaeus, 1758) China

P. r. crucivora Boisduval, 1836 Amur, Ussuri
P. r. debilis Alphéraky, 1889 Tian Shan
P. r. yunnana Mell, 1943 South China

- Pieris erutae Poujade, 1888 Yunnan
- Pieris deota (de Nicéville, 1884)
- Pieris krueperi Staudinger, 1860
- Pieris steinigeri Eitschberger, 1984 Weihsi
- Pieris chumbiensis (de Nicéville, 1897)

genus: Pontia

- Pontia daplidice (Linnaeus, 1758)

P. d. moorei (Röber, [1907]) Yunnan
P. d. amphimara (Fruhstorfer, 1908) Szetchuan

- Pontia callidice (Hübner, [1799-1800]) China, Tibet

P. c. amaryllis Hemming, 1933 Tian Shan
P. c. halasia Huang & Murayama, 1992 Xinjiang

- Pontia chloridice (Hübner, 1813)

genus: Prioneris

- Prioneris clemanthe Doubleday, 1846

P. c. euclemanthe Fruhstorfer, 1903 Hainan

- Prioneris thestylis Doubleday, 1842

P. t. formosana Fruhstorfer, 1903 Taiwan
P. t. hainanensis Fruhstorfer, 1910 Hainan

genus: Sinopieris

- Sinopieris dubernardi (Oberthür, 1884)

S. d. dubernardi (Oberthür, 1884) Yunnan, Sichuan
S. d. kozlovi (Alphéraky, 1897) Nanshan
S. d. gyantsensis (Verity, 1911) Tibet
S. d. rothschildi (Verity, 1911) Shaanxi
S. d. bromkampi (Bang-Haas, 1938) Gansu
S. d. wangi Huang, 1998 Tibet
S. d. pomiensis (Yoshino, 1998) Tibet

- Sinopieris davidis (Oberthür, 1876)

S. d. davidis (Oberthür, 1876) Yunnan
S. d. diluta (Verity, 1911)

- Sinopieris stoetzneri (Draeseke, 1924) Yunnan, Sichuan
- Sinopieris venata (Leech, 1891) Ta-chien-lu
- Sinopieris kozlovi (Alphéraky, 1897)

S. k. kozlov i (Alphéraky, 1897) Nanshan
S. k. aljinensis (Huang & Murayama, 1992) Xinjiang

genus: Zegris

- Zegris pyrothoe (Eversmann, 1832) West China
