= List of butterflies of Meghalaya =

This is a tentative list of butterfly species found in the Indian state of Meghalaya.

== Family Papilionidae ==
- Graphium sarpedon (Linnaeus, 1758)
- Graphium antiphates (Cramer, 1775)
- Papilio clytia Linnaeus, 1758
- Papilio demoleus Linnaeus, 1758
- Papilio helenus Linnaeus, 1758
- Papilio polyctor Boisduval, 1836
- Papilio polytes romulus Cramer, [1775]
- Papilio protenor Cramer, 1775
- Papilio nephelus Boisduval, 1836
- Troides helena (Linnaeus, 1758)
- Atrophaneura aidoneus Doubleday, 1845
- Pachliopta aristolochiae (Fabricius, 1775)
- Byasa dasarada (Moore, 1857)
- Byasa polyeuctes (Doubleday, 1842)

== Family Pieridae ==
- Aporia agathon (Gray)
- Appias lyncida (Cramer)
- Appias pandione (Geyer)
- Catopsilia crocale (Cramer)
- Catopsilia pyranthe (Linnaeus)
- Colias electo fieldi Menetries
- Delias acalis (Godart)
- Delias pasithoe (Linnaeus)
- Delias belladonna (Fabricius)
- Delias descombesi (Boisduval)
- Delias hyparete (Linnaeus)
- Eurema blanda silhetana (Wallace)
- Eurema brigitta rubella (Wallace)
- Eurema hecabe (Linnaeus)
- Eurema leata (Boisduval)
- Ixias pyrene (Linnaeus)
- Pieis brassicae nepalensis (Doubleday)
- Pieis canidia (Sparrman)
- Pieis napi (Linnaeus)
- Prioneris thestylis (Doubleday)

== Family Nymphalidae ==
- Parantica aglea (Stoll)
- Danaus chrysippus (Linnaeus)
- Danaus genutia (Cramer)
- Danaus melaneus (Cramer)
- Danaus sita (Kollar)
- Euploea core (Cramer)
- Euploea mulciber (Cramer)
- Lethe confusa Aurivillius
- Lethe verma (Kollar)
- Lethe yama (Moore)
- Lethe vindhya (C. Felder)
- Melanitis leda ismene (Cramer)
- Melanitis phedima (Stoll)
- Melanitis zitenius (Herbst)
- Ypthima nareda (Kollar)
- Ypthima sakra Moore
- Elymnias hypermnestra Linnaeus
- Elymnias malelas (Hewitson)
- Ethope himachala (Moore)
- Thaumantis diores Doubleday
- Argynnis childreni Gray
- Argynnis hyperbius (Johanssen)
- Argynnis laodice (Pallas)
- Cethosia biblis (Drury)
- Cethosia cyane (Drury)
- Cirrochroa aoris Doubleday
- Cyrestis thyodamas (Boisduval)
- Ergolis merione (Cramer)
- Eriboea dolon (Westwood)
- Eriboea arja (Felder)
- Neptis hordonia Stoll
- Neptis hylas Moore
- Neptis nandina Moore
- Neptis yeburyi Butler
- Pantoporia perius (Linnaeus)
- Pantoporia selanophora (Kollar)
- Phalanta phalantha (Drury)
- Junonia almana (Linnaeus)
- Junonia atlites (Linnaeus)
- Junonia hierta (Fabricius)
- Junonia iphita (Cramer)
- Junonia lemonias (Linnaeus)
- Junonia orithya (Linnaeus)
- Kaniska canace (Linnaeus)
- Vanessa cardui (Linnaeus)
- Vanessa indica (Herbst)
- Kallima inachus (Boisduval)
- Cynthia erota (Fabricius)
- Chersonesia risa (Doubleday)
- Symbrenthia hypselis (Godart)
- Hestina nama (Doubleday)
- Apatura ambica (Kollar)
- Stibochiona nicea (Gray)
- Charaxes polyxena (Cramer)
- Issoria sinha (Kollar)
- Euthalia phemius (Doubleday)
- Euthalia lepidea (Butler)
- Doleschallia bisaltide (Cramer)
- Acraea issoria (Hübner)

== Family Riodinidae ==
- Abisara chela (de Nicéville)
- Zemeros flegyas (Cramer)

== Family Lycaenidae ==
- Heliophorus androcles (Hewitson)
- Heliophorus brahma (Moore)
- Jamides alecto (Felder)
- Zizeeria maha (Kollar)

== Family Hesperiidae ==
- Badamia exclamationis (Fabricius)
- Celaenorrhinus leucocera (Kollar)
- Notocrypta curvifacia (Felder)
- Pelopidas mathias (Fabricius)
- Udaspes folus (Cramer)

== See also ==
- Butterfly
- List of butterflies of India
- List of butterflies of the Western Ghats
- Fauna of India
