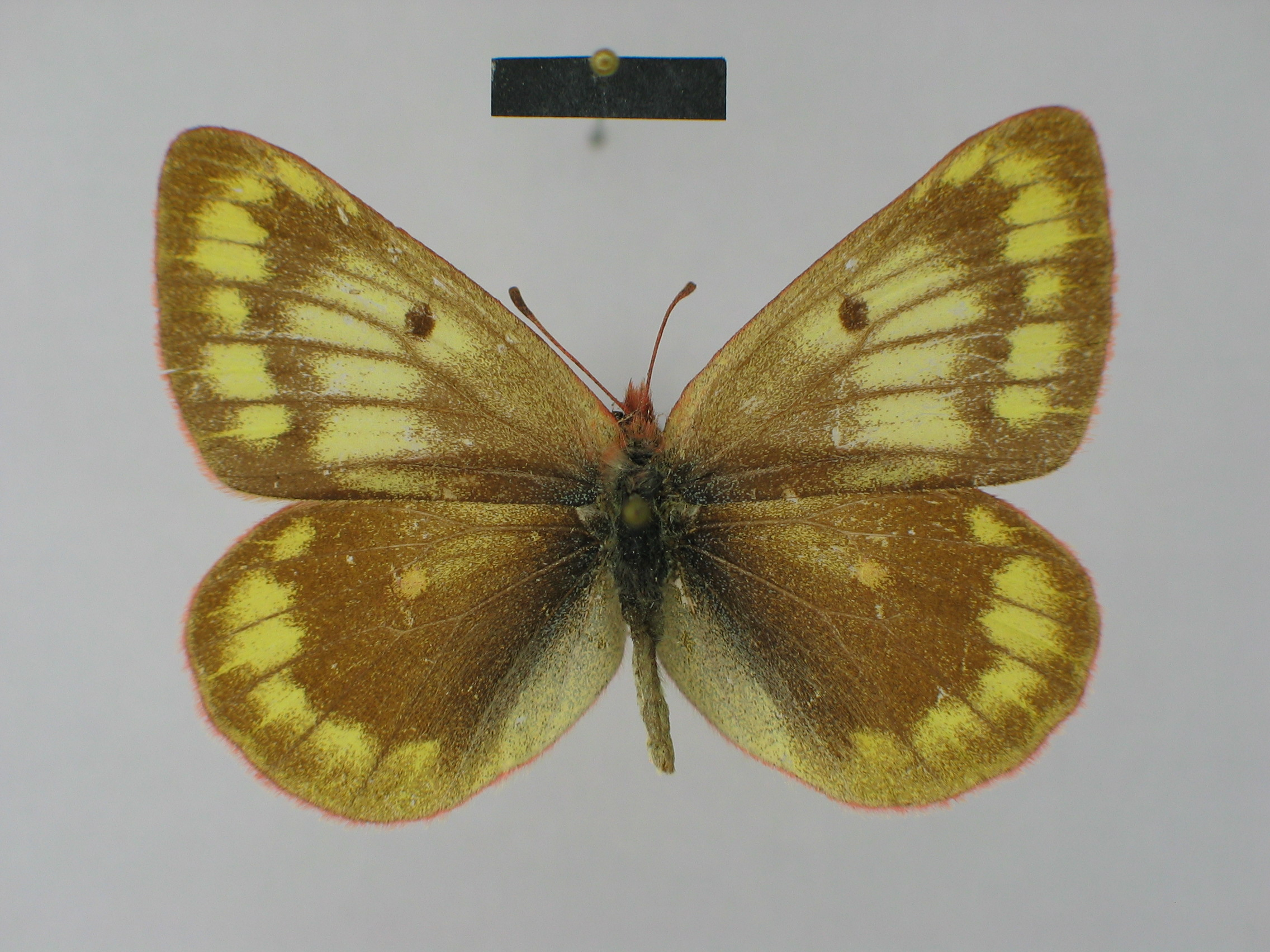
- Colias wanda baeckeri female

Scientific classification
- Kingdom: Animalia
- Phylum: Arthropoda
- Class: Insecta
- Order: Lepidoptera
- Family: Pieridae
- Genus: Colias
- Species: C. wanda

Binomial name
- Colias wanda Grum-Grshimailo, 1907

= Colias wanda =

Species of butterfly

Colias wanda is a butterfly in the family Pieridae. It is found in the eastern Palearctic realm (northern China).

== Subspecies ==
- Colias wanda wanda
- Colias wanda paskoi Kocman, 1999
- Colias wanda yangguifei Huang & Murayama, 1992

== Taxonomy ==
It was accepted as a species by Josef Grieshuber and Gerardo Lamas, but it may be a subspecies of Colias arida Alphéraky, 1889
