= Colias nebulosa =

- f

Scientific classification
- Kingdom: Animalia
- Phylum: Arthropoda
- Clade: Pancrustacea
- Class: Insecta
- Order: Lepidoptera
- Family: Pieridae
- Genus: Colias
- Species: C. nebulosa

Binomial name
- Colias nebulosa Oberthür, 1894

Synonyms
- Colias nebulosa niveata f. melanitica O. Bang-Haas, 1915; Colias nebulosa niveata f. melanina Bollow, 1930; Colias richthofeni O. Bang-Haas, 1927

Species of butterfly

Colias nebulosa is a butterfly in the family Pieridae. It is found in the eastern Palearctic realm (Tibet and China).

== Description ==
Colias nebulosa is much darker than Colias sifanica; the forewing without middle spot, but with light spot at the distal margin; the hindwing almost uniformly black, with large, conspicuous, light yellow middle spot, and light ray-like spots on the veins. We regard nebulosa as a distinct species.

== Subspecies ==
- C. n. nebulosa Sichuan
- C. n. karoensis Hoshiai & Rose, 1998 S. Tibet
- C. n. niveata Verity, [1909] Qinghai
- C. n. pugo Evans, 1924 S. E.Tibet
- C. n. richthofeni O. Bang-Haas, 1927 Richthofen Mts., Kukunor Mts
- C. n. sungpani O. Bang-Haas, 1927 Sichuan, Gansu

== Taxonomy ==
Accepted as a species by Josef Grieshuber & Gerardo Lamas
