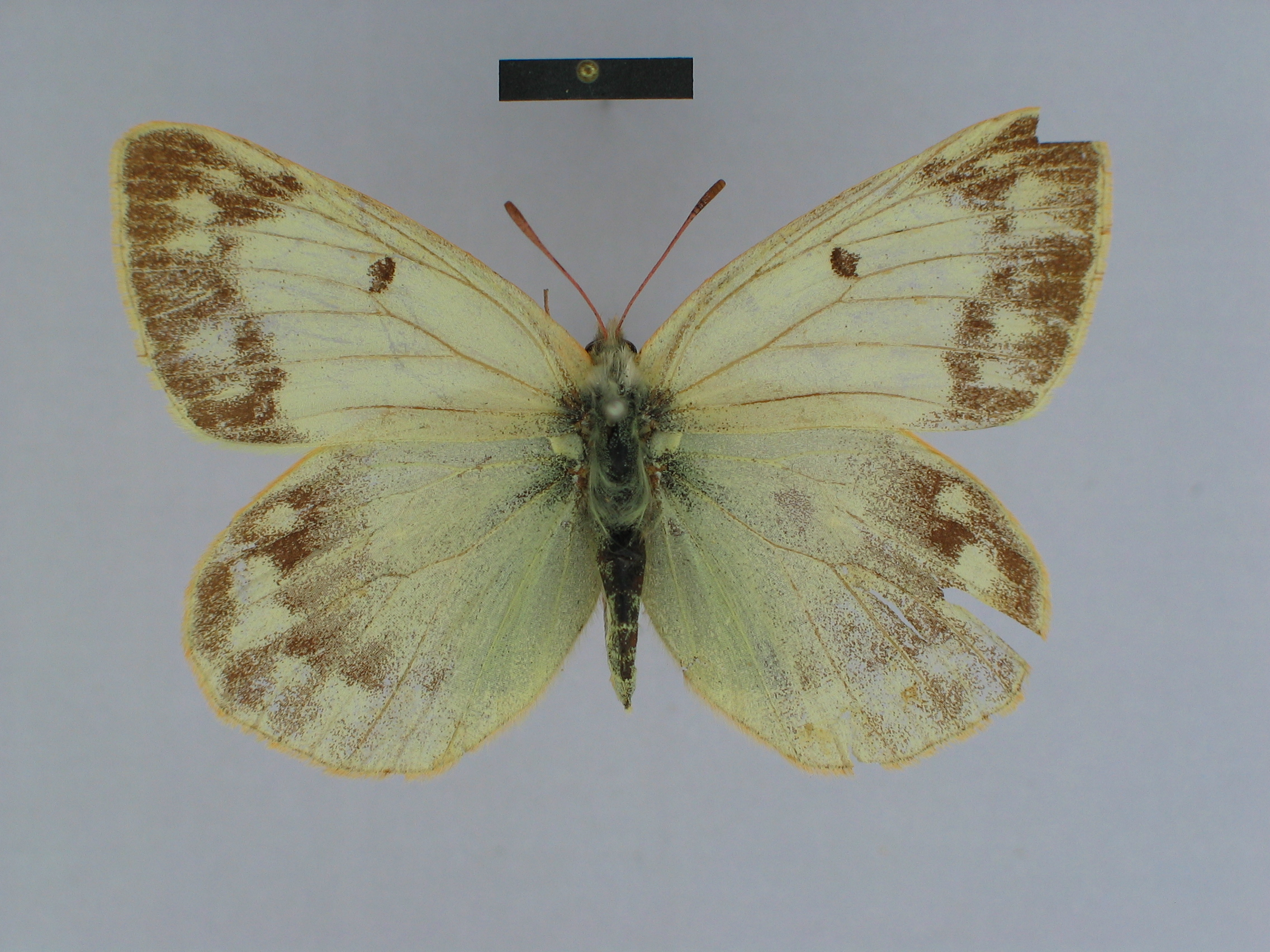

Scientific classification
- Kingdom: Animalia
- Phylum: Arthropoda
- Clade: Pancrustacea
- Class: Insecta
- Order: Lepidoptera
- Family: Pieridae
- Genus: Colias
- Species: C. grumi

Binomial name
- Colias grumi Alphéraky, 1897

= Colias grumi =

Species of butterfly

Colias grumi is a butterfly in the family Pieridae. It is found in north-western China (described from Nanshan).

== Subspecies ==
All described subspecies may be only ecological variations, and therefore junior synonyms. The taxa C. g. burchana and C. g. evanescens are only provisionally accepted as subspecies

- C. g. grumi
- C. g. aljinshana Huang & Murayama, 1992 Xinjiang.
- C. g. dvoraki Kocman, 1994

== Description ==
It is similar to Colias cocandica but is lighter in colour, the hindwing beneath being blue-grey, not greenish.

== Taxonomy ==
Accepted as a species by Josef Grieshuber & Gerardo Lamas
