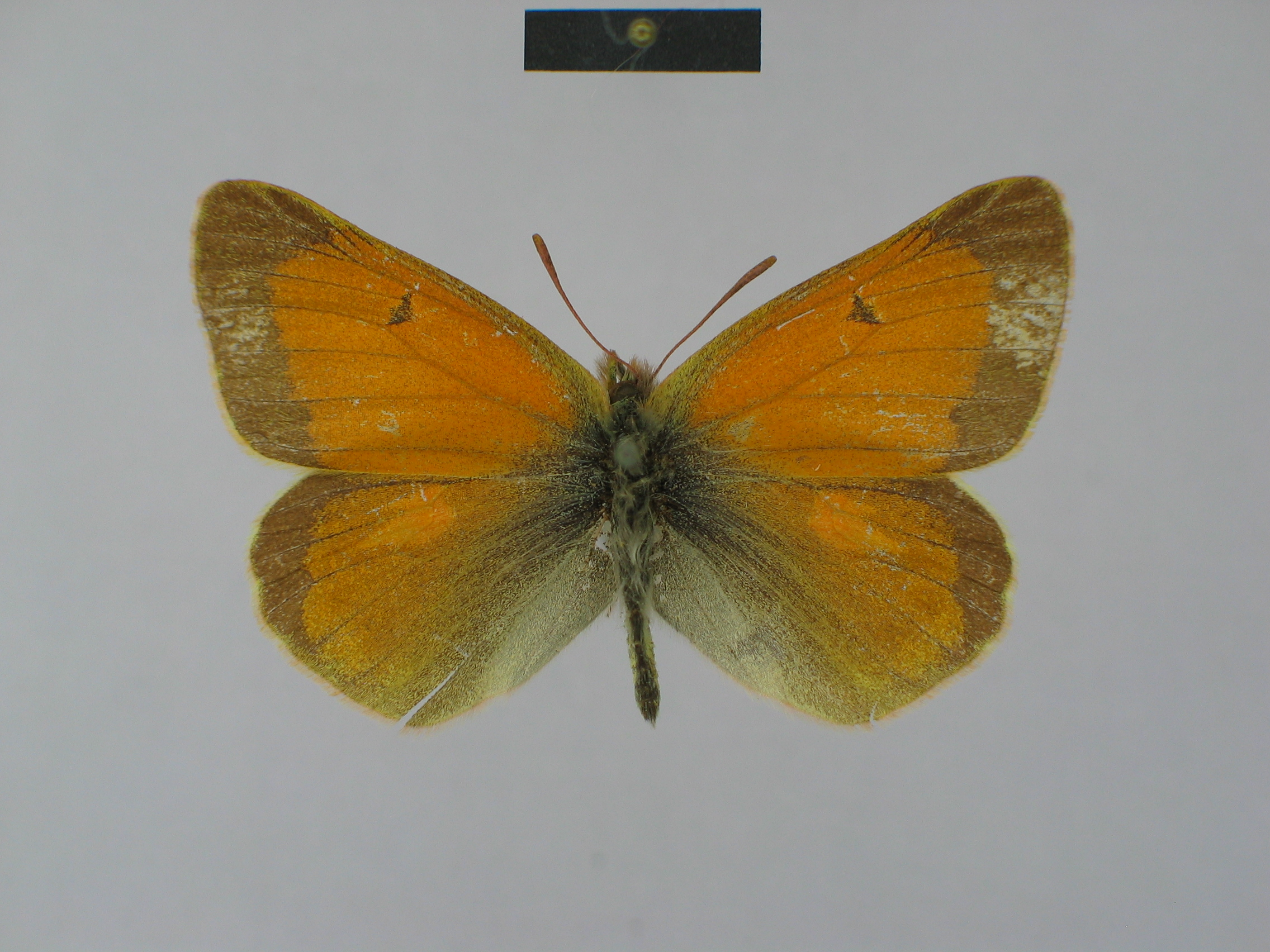
- dorsal side; scalebar=1 cm

Scientific classification
- Kingdom: Animalia
- Phylum: Arthropoda
- Clade: Pancrustacea
- Class: Insecta
- Order: Lepidoptera
- Family: Pieridae
- Genus: Colias
- Species: C. leechi

Binomial name
- Colias leechi Grum-Grshimailo, 1893

Synonyms
- Colias eogene var. leechi Grum-Grshimailo, 1893

= Colias leechi =

Species of butterfly

Colias leechi is a very little known butterfly in the family Pieridae. It was described from the East Palearctic "In ramificationibus occidentalibus montium Himalayensium in valle Chonging" (17,000 feet (5,200 m) altitude).

Chongqing covers a large area crisscrossed by rivers and mountains. None are high enough to fit the description and Röber gives Sikkim as the locality and the British Museum card gives the type locality as West Himalaya Ladak.

== Taxonomy ==
Described as a variety of Colias eogene. The Global Lepidoptera Names Index treats leechi as Colias staudingeri ssp. leechi. Accepted as a species by Josef Grieshuber & Gerardo Lamas
