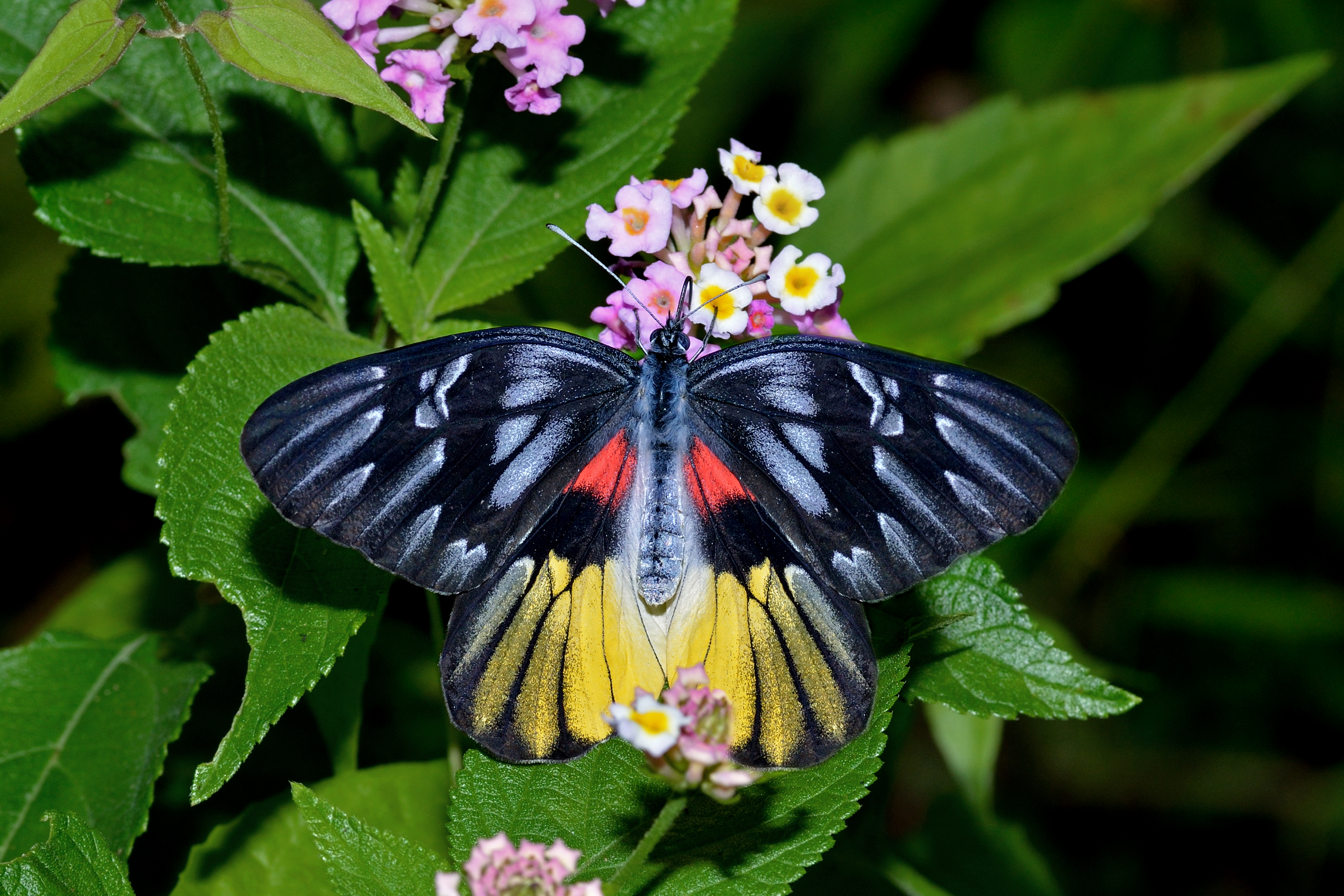
- Dorsal view
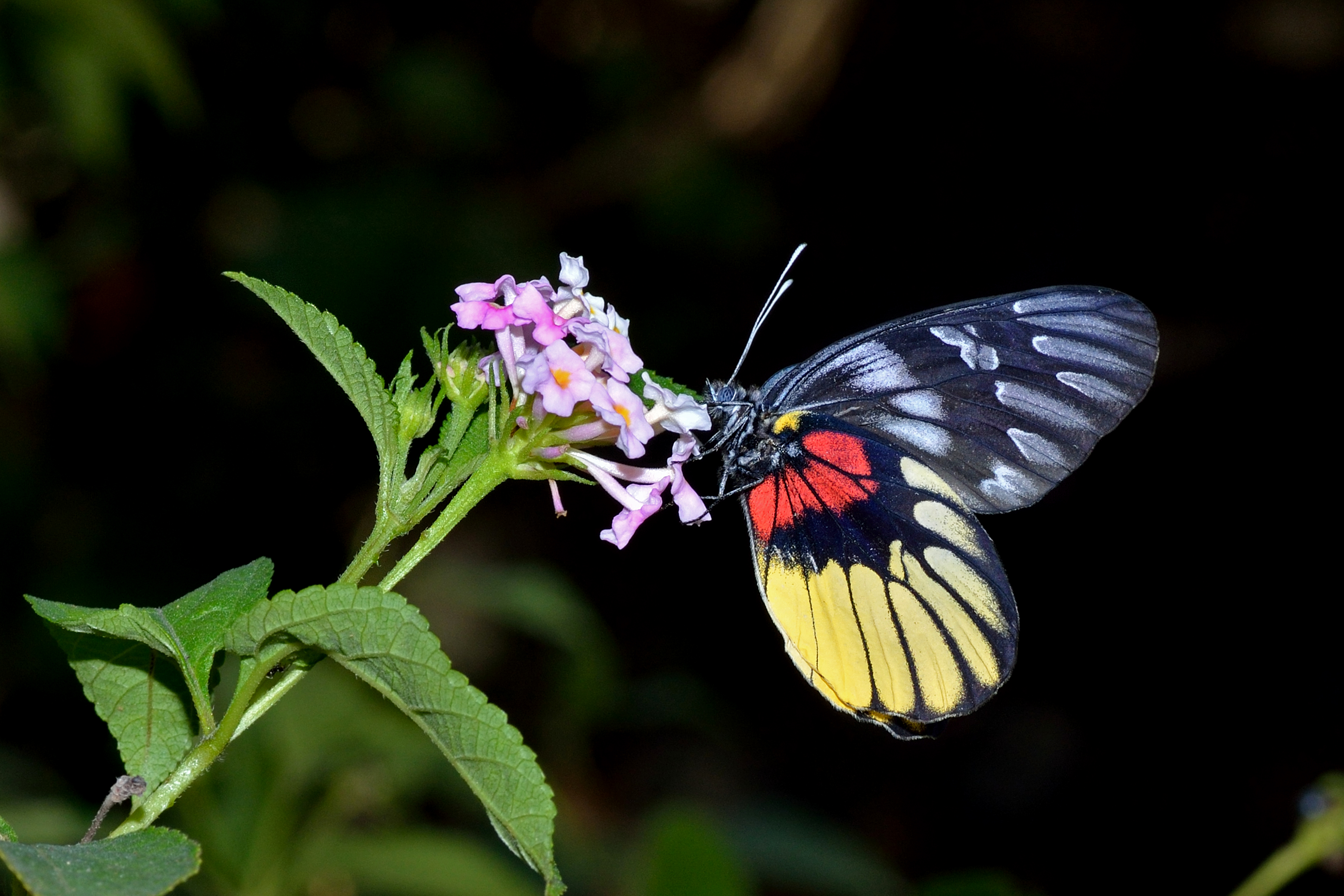
- Ventral view

Scientific classification
- Domain: Eukaryota
- Kingdom: Animalia
- Phylum: Arthropoda
- Class: Insecta
- Order: Lepidoptera
- Family: Pieridae
- Genus: Delias
- Species: D. acalis

Binomial name
- Delias acalis Godart, 1819

Synonyms
- Delias thysbe

= Delias acalis =

Redbreast Jezebel

Species of butterfly

Delias acalis, the redbreast Jezebel, is a medium-sized butterfly of the family Pieridae, that is, the yellows and whites.

== Description ==
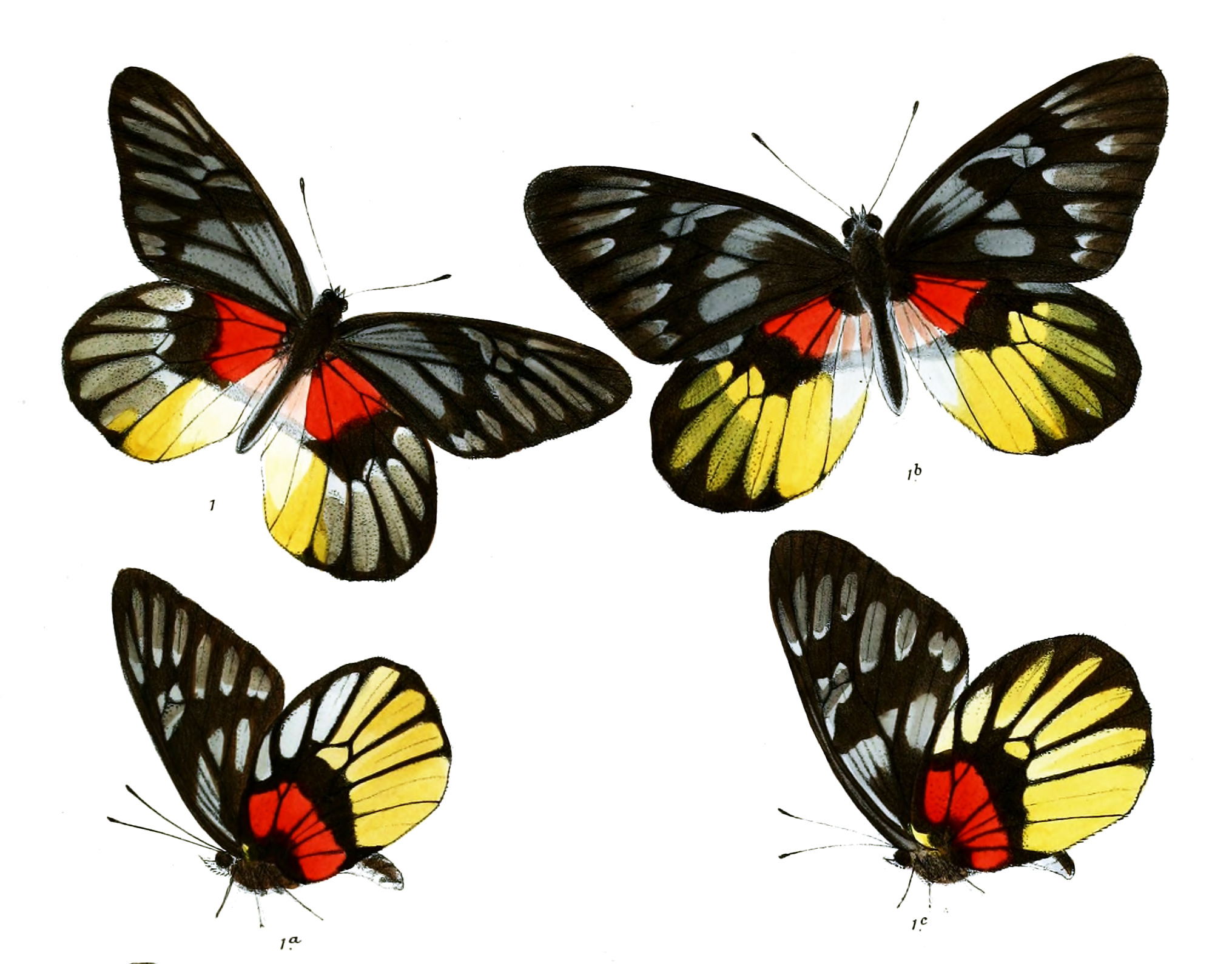

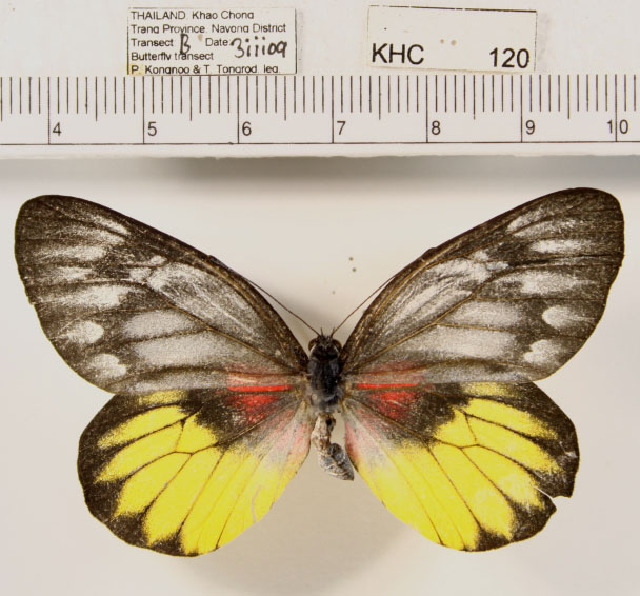
Dorsal view

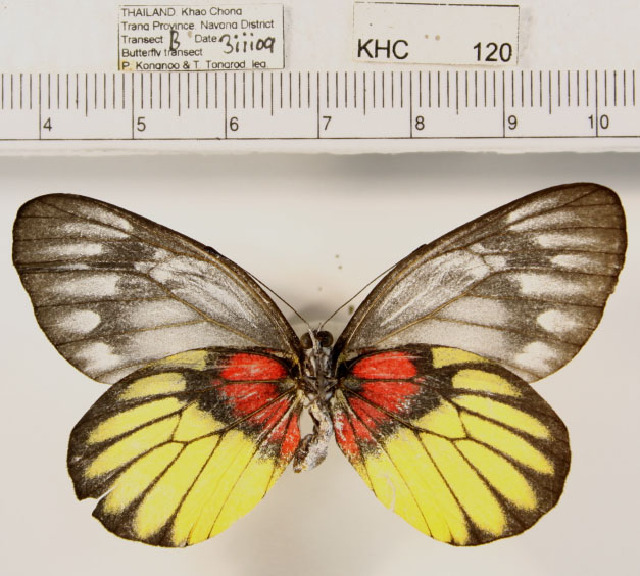
Ventral view

Delias acalis resembles Delias pasithoe in both sexes; the differences are as follows: Upper, forewing: the white spot at apex of cell replaced by an upper and a lower grey scaled spot that crosses the discocellulars, which are black; the postdiscal series of hastate (spear-shaped) spots converted into broad greyish diffuse streaks of which the streak in interspace 3 is shifted more inward than the others. In the rf the broad subbasal greyish streaks in interspaces 1 and 2 and in the cell are longer than in the female. Hindwing black; basal area to middle of cell deep vermilion, traversed by the black veins; interspaces la, 1 and posterior medial portion of 2 powdered thickly with greyish-white scales in the male; remainder of interspace 2 bright yellow; interspaces 3 to 8 with broad diffuse grey streaks that do not reach the termen, the streaks in interspace 5 extend into apex of cell; in female similar, but interspaces 2 to 5 with still broader yellow streaks, of which those in interspaces 4 and 5 cross over the discocellulars into the apex of the cell. Underside: similar to the upperside, the grey markings paler, almost white; hindwing in both sexes with the basal vermilion patch extended to the base of the dorsal margin: humeral angle at base of wing with an ochraceous spot; apex of cell and broad streaks in interspaces 1 to 8 yellow fading to yellowish white anteriorly: the veins narrowly black, which colour broadens triangularly at their apices and so forms anteriorly a more or less irregular terminal black margin. Antennae, head, thorax and abdomen as in D. pasithoe.

== Distribution ==
S.China;Nepal; Sikkim; Bhutan; Assam; Burma: Tenasserim; extending to Java and the Malay Peninsula.
