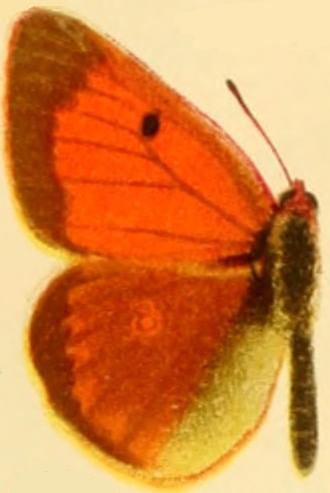
- Upperside
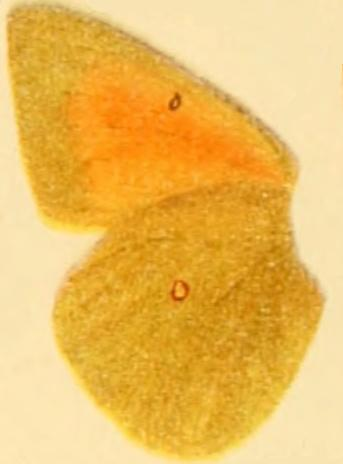
- Underside

Scientific classification
- Kingdom: Animalia
- Phylum: Arthropoda
- Clade: Pancrustacea
- Class: Insecta
- Order: Lepidoptera
- Family: Pieridae
- Genus: Colias
- Species: C. heos

Binomial name
- Colias heos Herbst, 1792

Synonyms
- Papilio aurora Esper, 1783 (preocc.); Colias aurora ab. obscura Moltrecht, 1909; Colias sibirica Lederer, 1852; Colias kenteana Rühl, 1895; Colias semenovi Shtandel, 1960

= Colias heos =

Species of butterfly

Colias heos is a butterfly in the family Pieridae. It is found in the East Palearctic (Altai to southern Siberia, Mongolia to Ussuri, southeastern China).

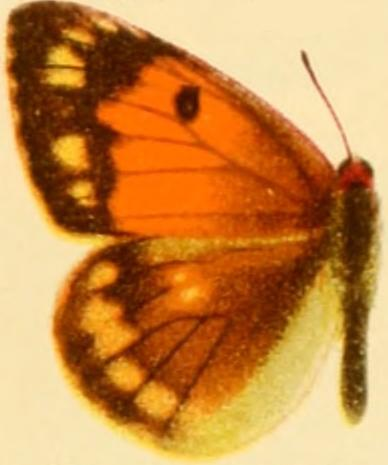
Female

== Description ==
C. aurora (heos) is a beautiful dark orange-red species. The veins are thinly black, being yellow however in the black marginal band. The hindwing is somewhat dusky, being again lighter before the black distal margin; the costa of the forewing is yellow, the moderately large middle spot of the forewing pale centred, the large orange-red middle spot of the hindwing contrasting with the ground. The underside of a beautiful yellow, with sparse markings, the black middle spot of the forewing pale centred, and that of the hindwing the colour of mother of pearl, edged with brownish, being sometimes double. The female has the ground colour orange red, or yellow, or white; the white females are named ab. chloe Eversmann; in the marginal band there are yellow spots, which are often united on the hindwing to form a band. decolorata Staudinger, from Dauria, is a lighter coloured local form.

== Biology ==
The larva feeds on Vicia, Astragalus, Trifolium lucanicum

== Subspecies ==
- C. h. heos
- C. h. alpina Verity, 1911 Altai, Sayan
- C. h. semenovi Shtandel, 1960
- C. h. thia Bang-Haas, 1934 "Kansu mer. occ., Meitschouan, Minschan. Anfang Juli- 2000 m"
- C. h. vespera O. Bang-Haas, 1929 "Kansu, Gebirge bei Lantschou"

== Taxonomy ==
Accepted as a species by Josef Grieshuber & Gerardo Lamas
