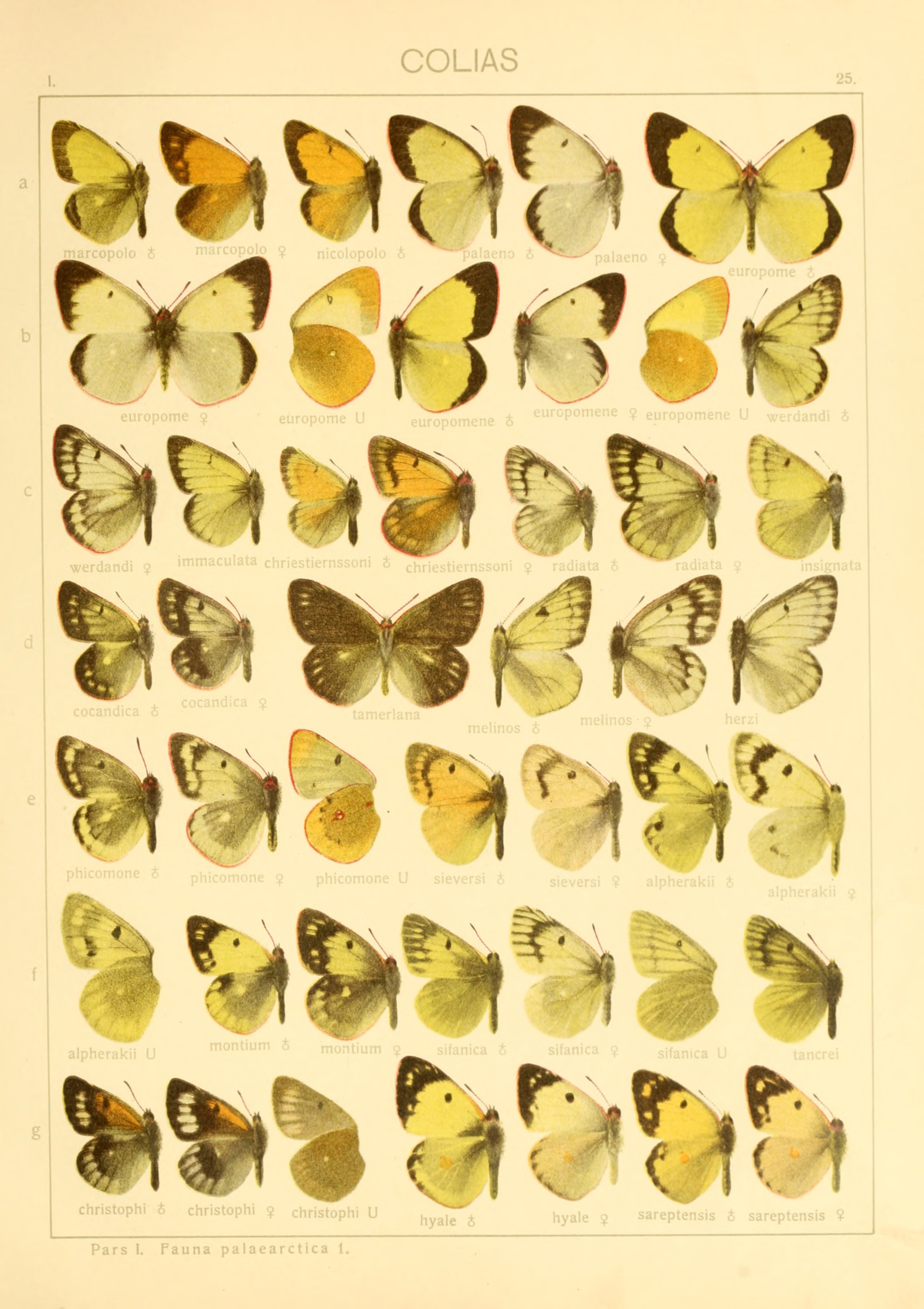

Scientific classification
- Kingdom: Animalia
- Phylum: Arthropoda
- Class: Insecta
- Order: Lepidoptera
- Family: Pieridae
- Genus: Colias
- Species: C. sieversi

Binomial name
- Colias sieversi Grum-Grshimailo, 1887

= Colias sieversi =

Species of butterfly

Colias sieversi is a butterfly of the family Pieridae, that is found in Tajikistan.

Colias sieversi was described from the Peter the Great Mountains, in Central Asia which occupy the eastern part of Bukhara and form a westerly extension of the northern Pamir.

== Description ==
Colias sieversi is in the male yellow above and below, with greyish black distal margin, slightly darker submarginal band and black middle spot to the forewing, the distal marginal marking of the hindwing being vestigial. Underside of forewing yellow, with a black pale-centred middle spot and small blackish submarginal spots; hindwing dusted with dark scaling, the middle spot being mother-of-pearl colour, edged with reddish. Fringes reddish. The female is white above and below, being slightly yellowish; distal marginal markings strongly reduced.
