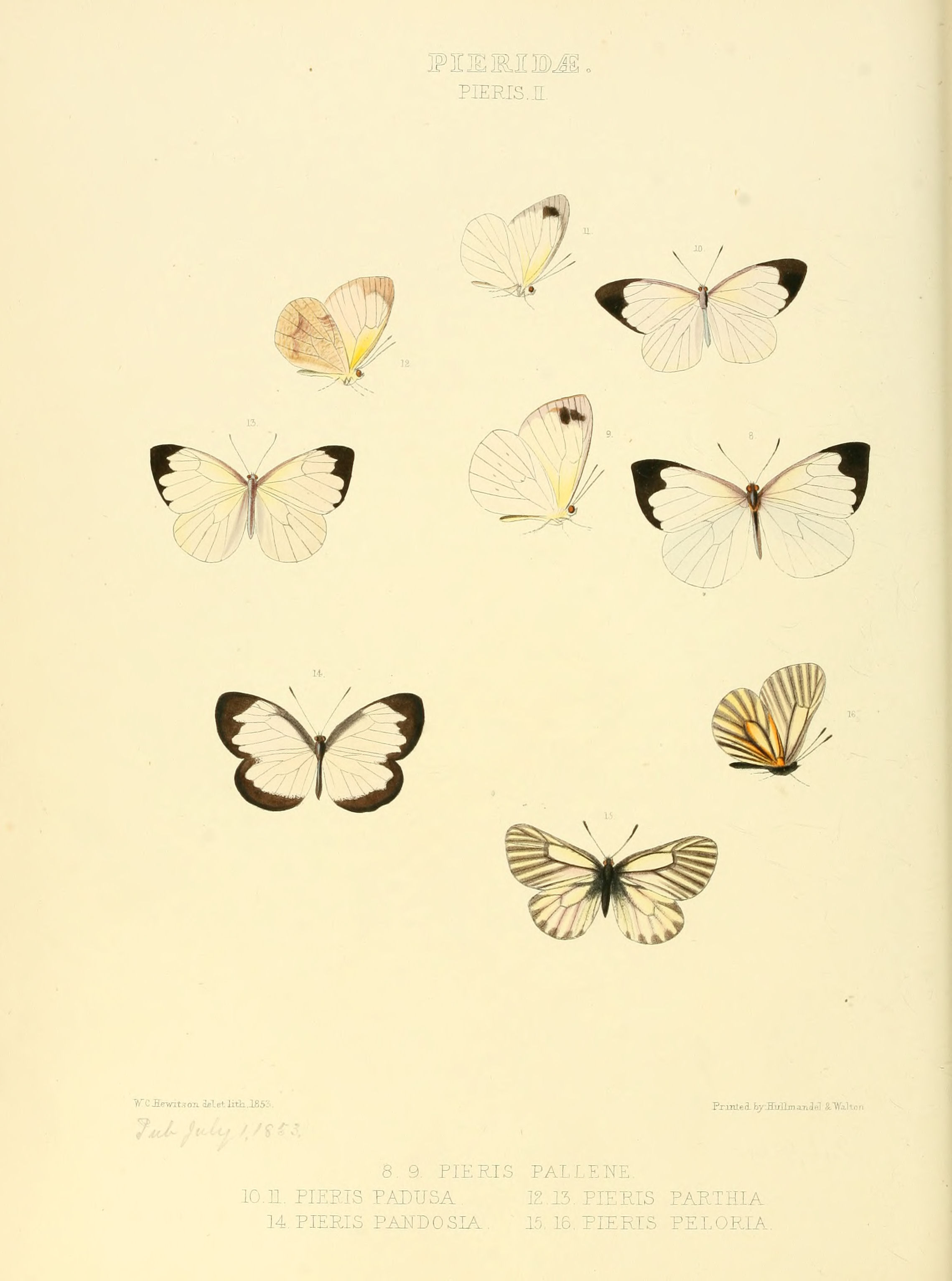
- Figures 15 and 16

Scientific classification
- Kingdom: Animalia
- Phylum: Arthropoda
- Clade: Pancrustacea
- Class: Insecta
- Order: Lepidoptera
- Family: Pieridae
- Genus: Mesapia; Gray, 1856
- Species: M. peloria

Binomial name
- Mesapia peloria (Hewitson, 1853)

Synonyms
- Pieris peloria Hewitson, 1853; Aporia peloria; Aporia lama Alphéraky, 1887

= Mesapia =

Monotypic butterfly genus in family Pieridae

Mesapia is a genus of butterflies in the family Pieridae. It contains only one species, Mesapia peloria, the Tibet blackvein, which is found in India, Nepal and China. It is a mid-sized to large species.

== Subspecies ==
- M. p. epsteina Tadokoro, T, Koide, Y. & Hori, K., 2014 (Nepal, southern slope of Himalaya)
- M. p. peloria (Kukunoor, Tsinghai)
- M. p. grayi O. Bang-Haas, 1934 (Gansu)
- M. p. leechi O. Bang-Haas, 1934 (western Sichuan)
- M. p. tibetensis D'Abrera, 1990 (south-eastern Tibet)
- M. p. minima Huang, 1998 (north-western Tibet: Xiangangjiang Mountains)

== See also ==
- Pieridae
- List of butterflies of India
- List of butterflies of India (Pieridae)
