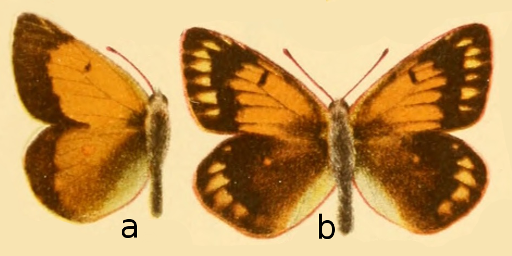
- a. male, b. female

Scientific classification
- Kingdom: Animalia
- Phylum: Arthropoda
- Class: Insecta
- Order: Lepidoptera
- Family: Pieridae
- Genus: Colias
- Species: C. arida

Binomial name
- Colias arida Alphéraky, 1889

Synonyms
- Colias eogene var. arida Alphéraky, 1889; Colias eogene ab. auritheme Grum-Grshimailo, 1893; Colias cocandica irma Evans, 1924; Colias arida var. wanda Grum-Grshimailo, 1893

= Colias arida =

Species of butterfly

Colias arida is a butterfly in the family Pieridae found in Tibet and western China.

== Taxonomy ==
Treated as a form of Colias eogene by Röber and described as "paler than eogene, the apex of the forewing being more rounded; among this form there occur as aberrations aurithetne Gr.-Grsh. males with yellow-spotted distal margin, and wanda Gr.-Grsh. light-coloured males." It was accepted as a full species by Grieshuber & Lamas in 2007.

== Subspecies ==
Listed alphabetically:

- C. a. arida
- C. a. cakana Rose & Schulte, 1992
- C. a. muetingi Rose & Schulte, 1992
- C. a. wanda Grum-Grshimailo, 1893 - may be a full species as Colias wanda
