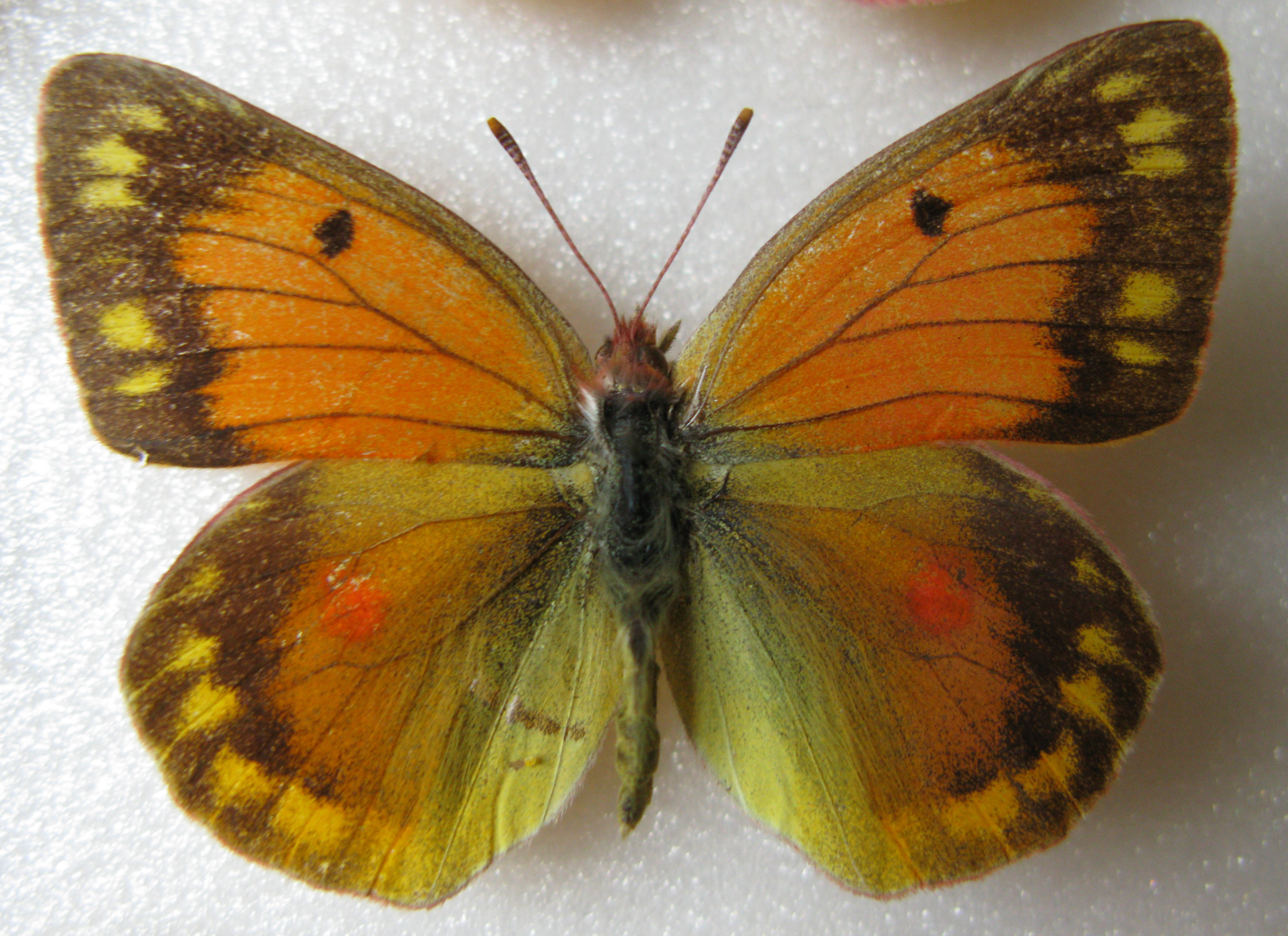
- Female

Scientific classification
- Kingdom: Animalia
- Phylum: Arthropoda
- Class: Insecta
- Order: Lepidoptera
- Family: Pieridae
- Genus: Colias
- Species: C. staudingeri

Binomial name
- Colias staudingeri Alphéraky, 1881

Synonyms
- Colias staudingeri var. pamira ab. verityi Avinoff, 1910

= Colias staudingeri =

Species of butterfly

Colias staudingeri is a butterfly in the family Pieridae. It is found in Turkmenistan, Tajikistan and Uzbekistan. The habitat consists of alpine meadows at altitudes between 2,000 and 3,900 meters.

Adults are on wing from June to July.

== Subspecies ==
- C. s. staudingeri (northern and inner Tien-Shan)
- C. s. emivittata Verity, 1911 (central Tien-Shan)
- C. s. maureri Staudinger, 1901 (Alaisky Mountains)
- C. s. pamira Grum-Grshimailo, 1890 (Zaalaisky Mountains)
- C. s. leechi Grum-Grshimailo, 1893 (Ladakh) uncertain taxon
