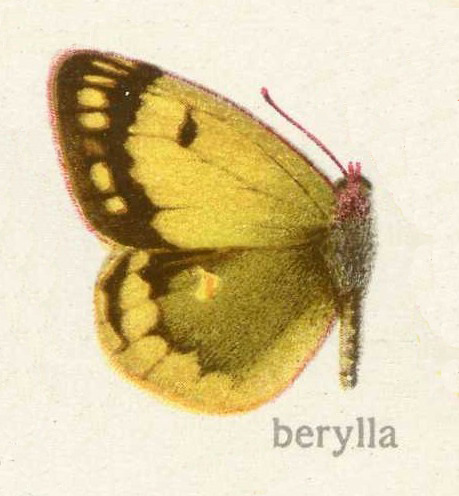

Scientific classification
- Kingdom: Animalia
- Phylum: Arthropoda
- Class: Insecta
- Order: Lepidoptera
- Family: Pieridae
- Genus: Colias
- Species: C. berylla

Binomial name
- Colias berylla Fawcett, 1904

= Colias berylla =

Everest clouded yellow

Species of butterfly

Colias berylla, the Everest clouded yellow, is a small butterfly of the family Pieridae, that is, the yellows and whites, which is found in Sikkim (India) and Tibet.

== Description ==
Greenish yellow in the male, with a moderately broad, yellow-spotted marginal band, black median spot on the forewing and a yellow one on the hindwing; hindwing darkened. Underside yellowish green, with black middle spot on forewing, a white one on hindwing, a band of yellow submarginal spots on both wings, and black submarginal spots on the posterior portion of the forewing. The females vary in ground colour from lemon-yellow to light orange, the hindwing being strongly darkened; the light submarginal spots rounded or elongate, often reaching to the margin; underside more strongly green, sometimes much darkened.

== Subspecies ==
- C. b. berylla
- C. b. bergeriana Verhulst, 1992

== See also ==
- List of butterflies of India
- List of butterflies of India (Pieridae)
