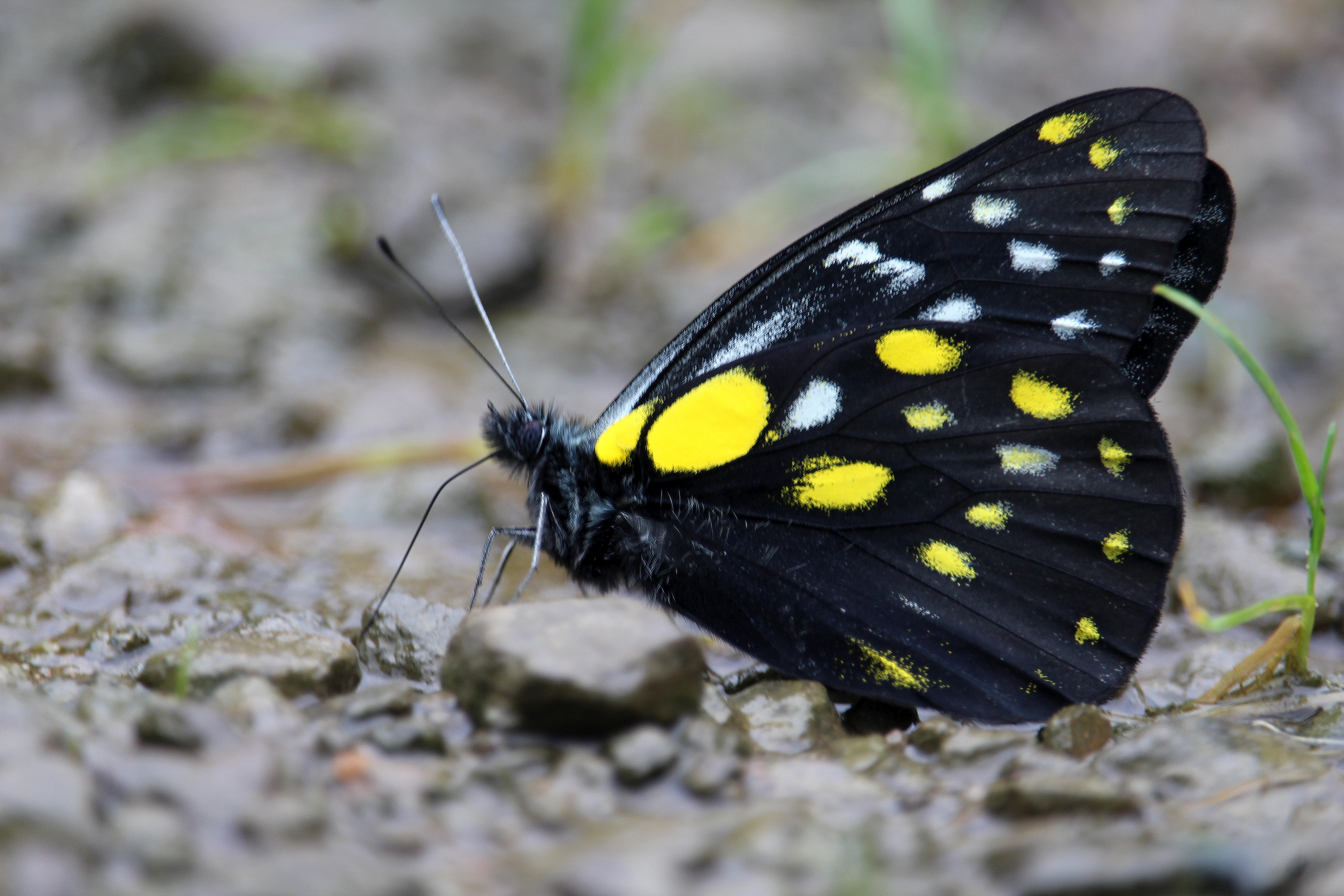

Scientific classification
- Domain: Eukaryota
- Kingdom: Animalia
- Phylum: Arthropoda
- Class: Insecta
- Order: Lepidoptera
- Family: Pieridae
- Genus: Delias
- Species: D. belladonna

Binomial name
- Delias belladonna (Fabricius, 1793)

= Delias belladonna =

Hill Jezebel

Species of butterfly

Delias belladonna, the hill Jezebel, is a medium-sized mountain butterfly of India and adjacent countries. It belongs to the family Pieridae, that is, the yellows and whites.

== Subspecies ==
The subspecies of Delias belladonna found in India are-

- Delias belladonna horsfieldi Gray, 1831 – Himalayan Hill Jezebel
- Delias belladonna ithiela Butler, 1869 – Sikkim Hill Jezebel
- Delias belladonna lugens Jordan, 1925 – Lushai Hill Jezebel

== Description ==
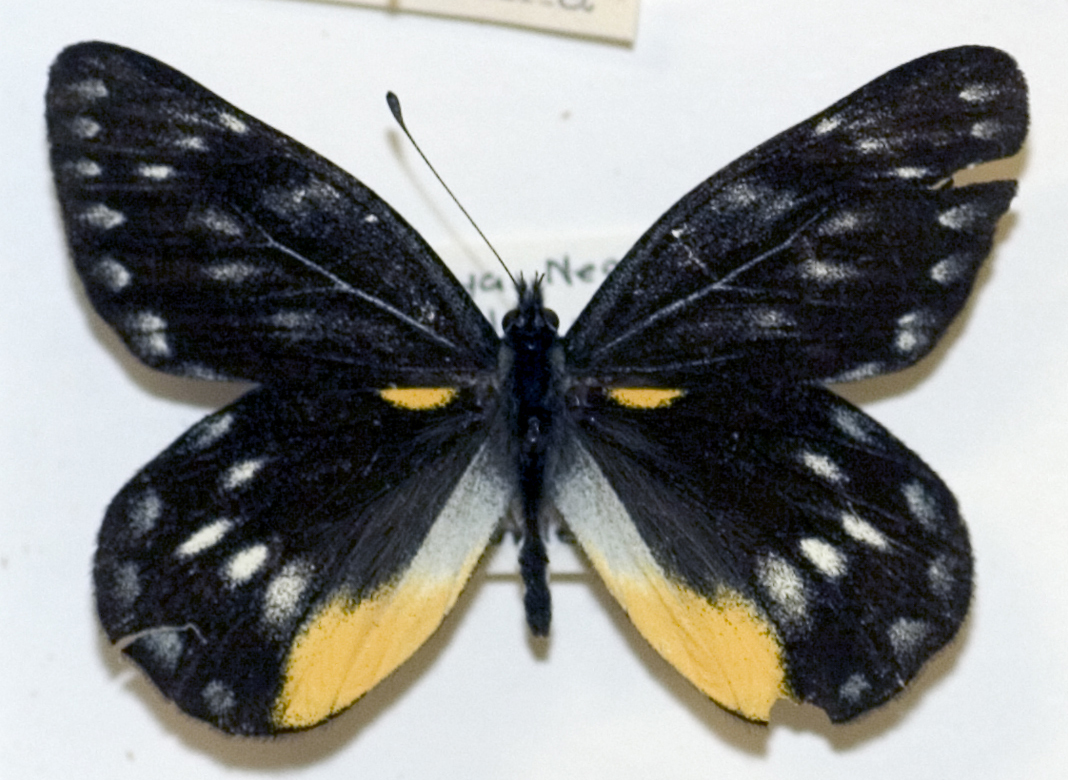
Delias belladonna malayana female, upperside

The male has the upperside dusky brownish black to black. Forewing with the following diffuse white markings: Cell with an oblique subapical bar, an angulated discal series of three upper spots inclined obliquely outwards and three lower spots inclined obliquely inwards; in most specimens the oblique bar in the cell and the lower two of the discal series of spots are extended diffusely inwards; finally, a subterminal series of large rounded spots white inwardly, irrorated with black scales outwardly. Hindwing: dorsal margin, including interspaces la, 1 and 2, basal half whitish, apical half more or less strongly tinged with pure canary yellow; a large oval yellow spot at base of interspaces 7 and 8; a broad, ill-defined diffuse whitish streak in cell; a discal series of diffuse whitish spots that is angulated outwards at interspace 5, the posterior spots more or less tinged with yellow; followed by a subterminal series of whitish spots as on the forewing, only slightly tinged with yellow. Underside: ground colour similar but more brownish, markings similar but more clearly and sharply defined; the subterminal series of spots on both forewings and hindwings more or less dentate; the upper three spots of this series on the forewing and generally all of the spots on the hindwing yellow; on the hindwing the dorsal margin and the cell-streak are also yellow, while the discal series of spots are more often than not tinged with the same colour. Antennae, head, thorax and abdomen black, the antennae annulated obscurely with white, the abdomen beneath white.

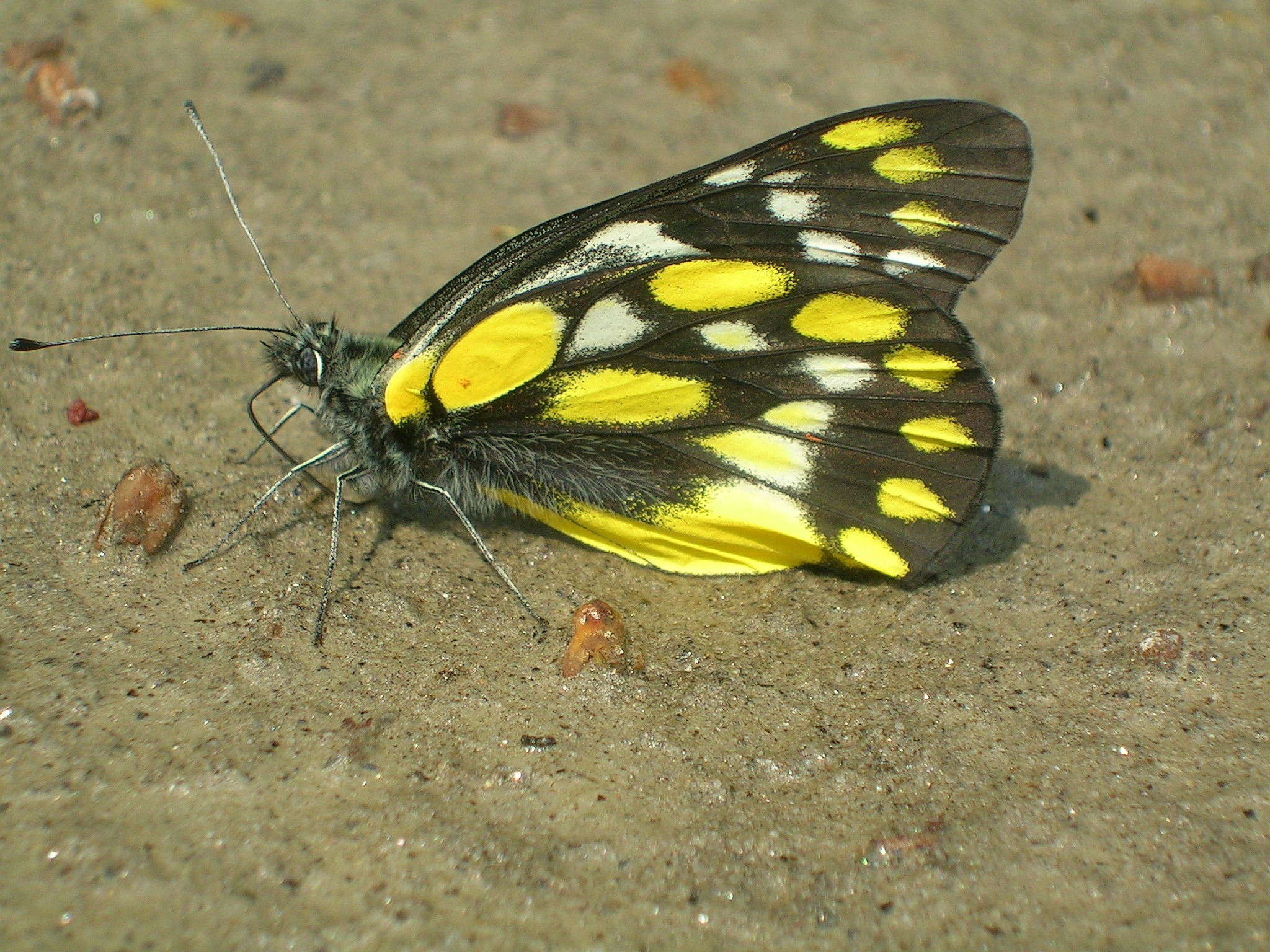

Female is similar, ground colour always paler and duller: markings on the upperside less distinct, the subterminal series of spots on the forewing as a rule farther from the margin than in the male.

Wingspan of 70–98 mm.

== Distribution ==
This species lives in the Himalayas from Kulu to Sikkim Bhutan at altitudes from 2,000 to 7,000 feet (610 to 2,130 m); Assam: the Khasi Hills; the hills of Burma and Tenasserim; extending into Thailand and China.

== See also ==
- Pieridae
- List of butterflies of India (Pieridae)
