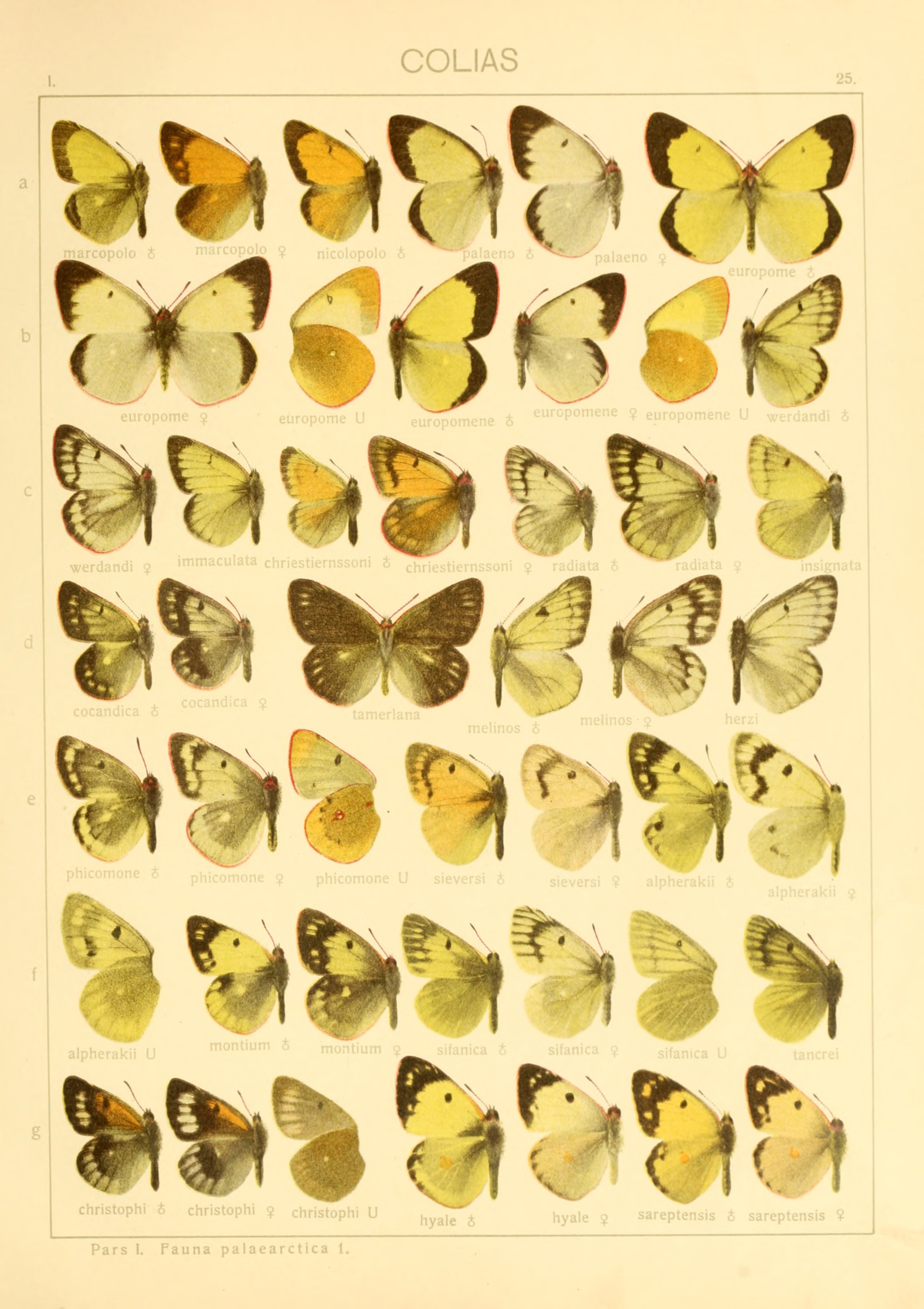
- Line "f" - 4th, 5th and 6th images

Scientific classification
- Kingdom: Animalia
- Phylum: Arthropoda
- Class: Insecta
- Order: Lepidoptera
- Family: Pieridae
- Genus: Colias
- Species: C. sifanica

Binomial name
- Colias sifanica Grum-Grshimailo, 1891

Synonyms
- Colias sifanica sifanica f. tancrei Röber, [1907]

= Colias sifanica =

Species of butterfly

Colias sifanica is a butterfly in the family Pieridae. It is found in the eastern Palearctic realm (China and Tibet).

== Description ==
C. sifanica from Amdo and the Qinghai Lake, is pale sulphur yellow above in male, with darkened base, diffuse dark marginal and submarginal markings and black middle spot. Antenna red. Underside with lighter ground colour than upper, but dusted with dark, the dark markings very feebly developed, the middle spot of the forewing being black with white centre, and that of hindwing white. The female impure white above, the dark markings more sharply defined, the hindwing being yellowish. The proximal portion of the underside of the forewing is white; the hindwing has a larger and a smaller white middle spot, the ground colour being lighter than in the male, dusted with grey-greenish scaling. A darkened form of this species is being sold as nebulosa, but is not identical with this species. In this form tancrei from the Kuku-nor, which we name ab. tancrei (25 f), the black marking are more developed and the proximal area of the forewing and hindwing is so strongly dusted with dark that there remain only narrow streak-like spots of the yellow ground colour.

== Biology ==
The larva on feeds on Caragana species.

== Subspecies ==
- C. s. sifanica Amdo, Qinghai, Gansu
- C. s. herculeana Bollow, 1930 Gansu

== Taxonomy ==
It was accepted as a species by Josef Grieshuber & Gerardo Lamas.
