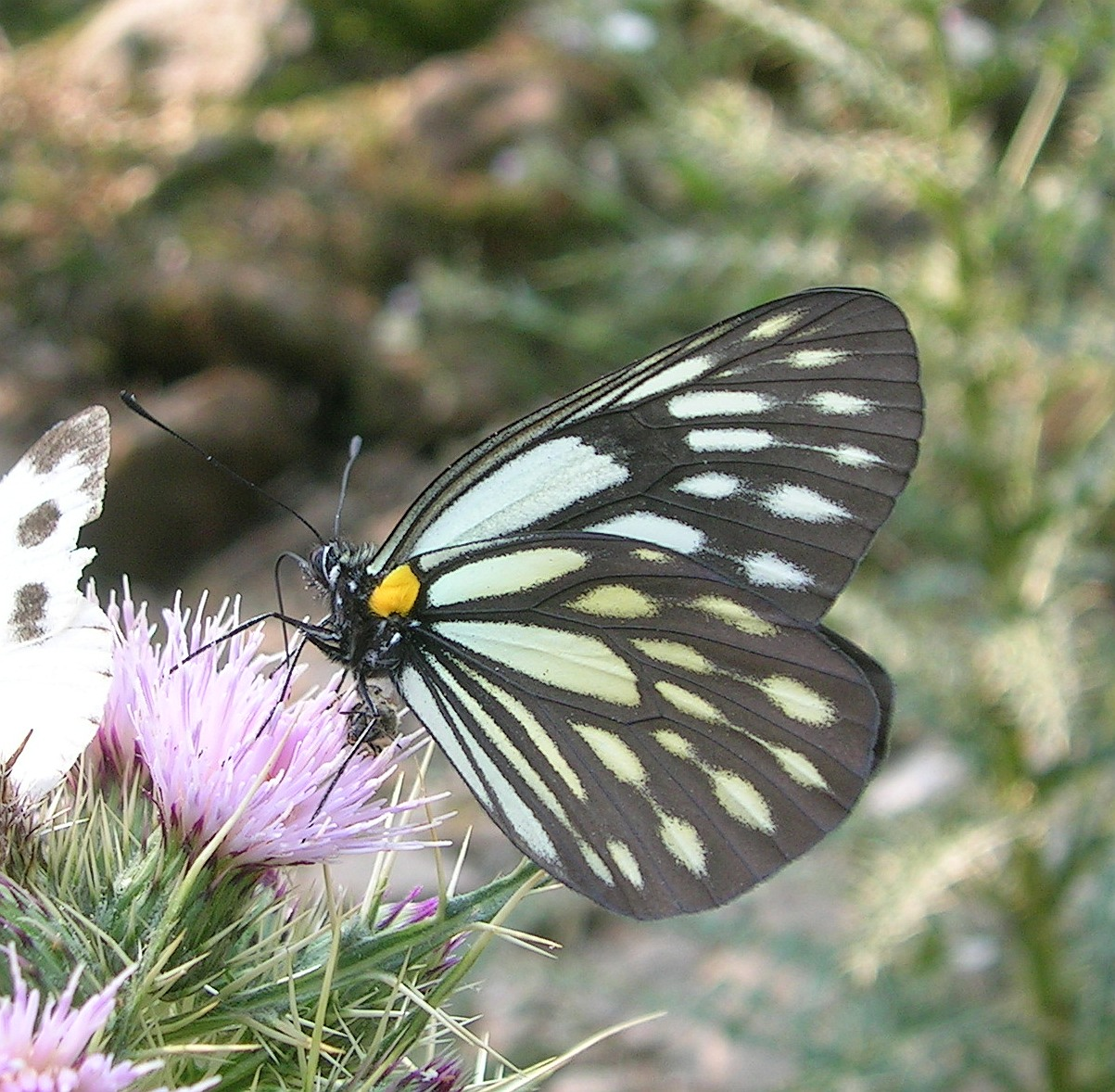

Scientific classification
- Domain: Eukaryota
- Kingdom: Animalia
- Phylum: Arthropoda
- Class: Insecta
- Order: Lepidoptera
- Family: Pieridae
- Genus: Aporia
- Species: A. agathon

Binomial name
- Aporia agathon (Gray, 1832)

= Aporia agathon =

Great blackvein

Species of butterfly

Aporia agathon, the great blackvein, is a mid-sized butterfly of the family Pieridae, that is, the yellows and whites, which is found in Nepal, India, China and Southeast Asia.

== Description ==
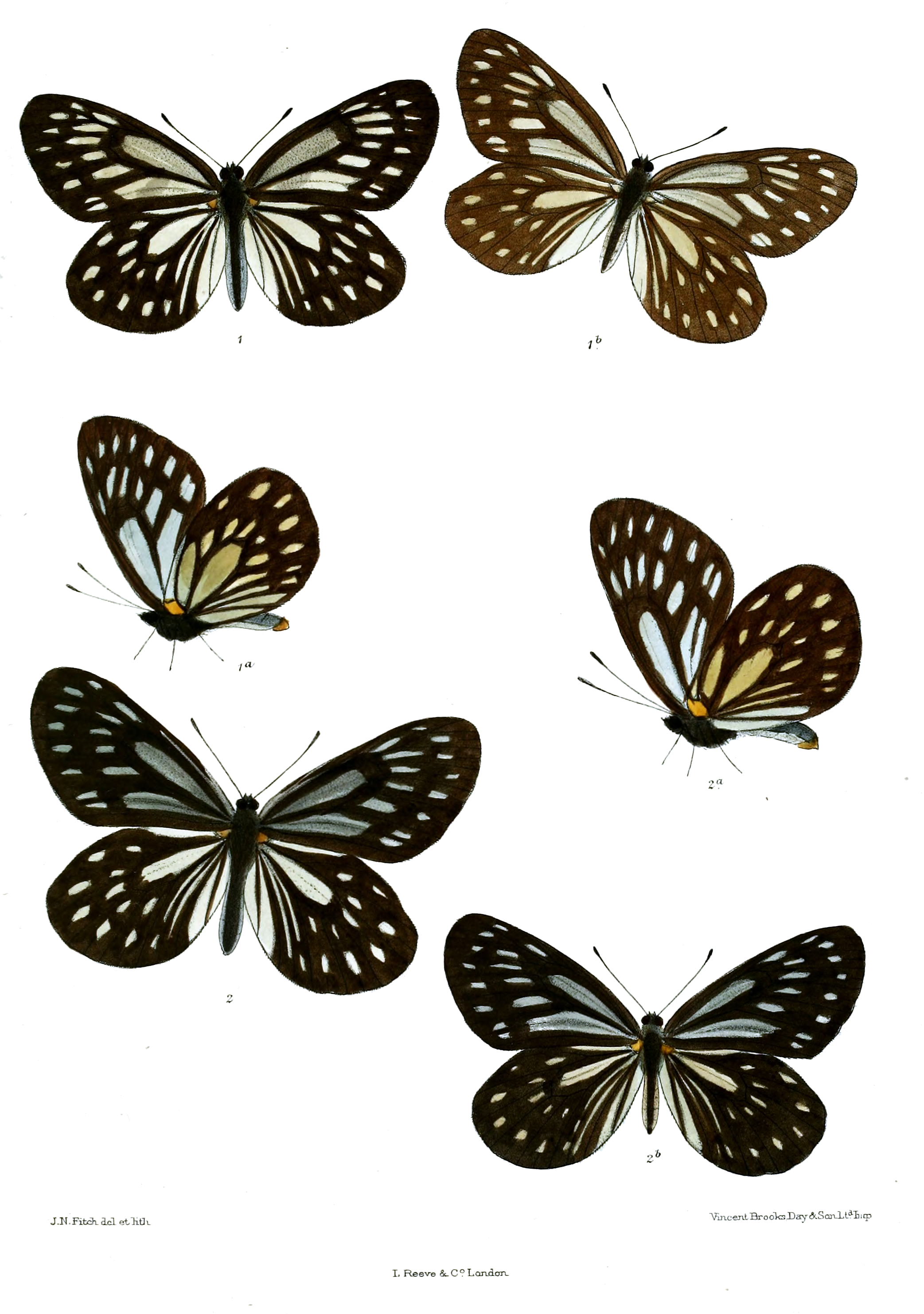

Typical form has the upperside black; forewings and hindwings with the following white or greenish-white streaks and spots in the discoidal cells and in the interspaces. Forewing: a broad streak in cell, two more or less confluent streaks obscurely divided by a diffuse blackish line below it in interspace 1, followed by an upper discal series of five short lines in interspaces 3, 4, 5 and 10, and a subterminal complete series of elongate narrow spots; both the discal and subterminal series are curved inwards anteriorly. In most specimens the streaks in interspace 1 and in cell are irrorated with black scales. Hindwing: a broad streak along the dorsum divided by vein 1a, two narrow long streaks in interspace 1, a much broader elongated oval streak in cell, with another elongate broad streak above it in interspace 7, a discal series of five narrow elongate spots apex of cell, followed by a complete subterminal series of more or less oval spots. Underside: ground colour and markings similar, more clearly defined, and on the forewing generally broader and whiter, except that the anterior one or two streaks or spots of the discal and subterminal series, like all the markings on the hindwing, are strongly suffused with bright yellow; in addition the precostal area on the hindwing is bright chrome yellow. Antennae, head, thorax and abdomen are black; abdomen beneath is white, and the anterior legs with one or two white spots.

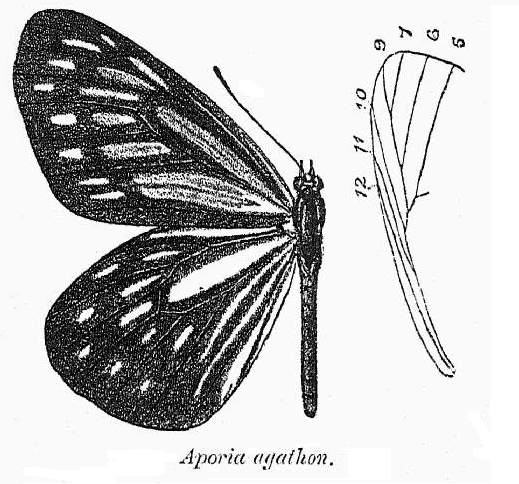
Venation

Variety caphusa Moore (Sikkim; Kumaon; Mussoorie to Simla and the Kangra region) differs from A. agathon both on the upper and under sides in the much greater width and extension of the greenish-white markings in the discoidal cells and interspaces of the wings. On the upperside the streak in interspace 1 of the forewing shows no sign of any black dividing line, and it, as well as the short streaks of the discal series, show a tendency to coalesce with the subterminal elongate spots. On the underside the spots near apex of forewing and those on the hindwing are only faintly, not clearly, suffused with yellow; the chrome-yellow spot at base of the latter as in A. agathon. Antennae, head, thorax and abdomen as in A. agathon, the abdomen more dark brown than black.

Var. phryxe, Boisduval. This is the palest of the series of the varieties of A. agathon. The intercellular and interspacial greenish-white streaks and spots, which, in var. caphusa, are considerably longer and broader and, so far as the markings in the interspaces are concerned, show a tendency to coalesce, in phryxe become very broad and white, so that the discal series of short streaks on both wings extend to and coalesce completely with the much broadened spots of the subterminal series. In fact, the insect may be described as white both on the upper and under sides, the veins broadly bordered with black, and with black terminal margins formed by the expansion and coalescence of the black at the apices of the veins; discoidal cell of the forewing with a large patch of black at the apex. The black along the veins of both forewing and hindwing suddenly broadened on the discal area; on the underside of the hindwing they almost form a connected discal, transverse black band; the chrome-yellow spot on the precostal area as in A. agathon. Antennae black, head and thorax dusky grey, abdomen white; beneath: head and thorax blackish, abdomen white.

It has a wingspan of 84–98 mm.

== Distribution ==
It is found in the sub-Himalayan region from Assam, Sikkim, Bhutan, Nepal to Mussoorie, and Kumaon in the west.

== Life history ==
Larva: "The larvae of A. caphusa are gregarious, and to pupate burrow under the dry leaves at the foot of their food-plant, the pupae being also gregarious. The larvae spin a joint web, and lie together in communities of ten or more. They feed at night only. Colour when full-grown dirty brown, head black, each segment with a dorsal longitudinal dark brown stripe; the larva is thinly covered with weak white hairs. Just before pupation the colour turns to a light green, with the head and stripes as before." (Mackinnon quoted in Bingham)

The pupa is "very similar in shape to that of Aporia soracte is greenish-yellow with black markings." (Mackinnon quoted in Bingham)

A food plant of the larva is Berberis napaulensis.

== See also ==
- Pieridae
- List of butterflies of India (Pieridae)
