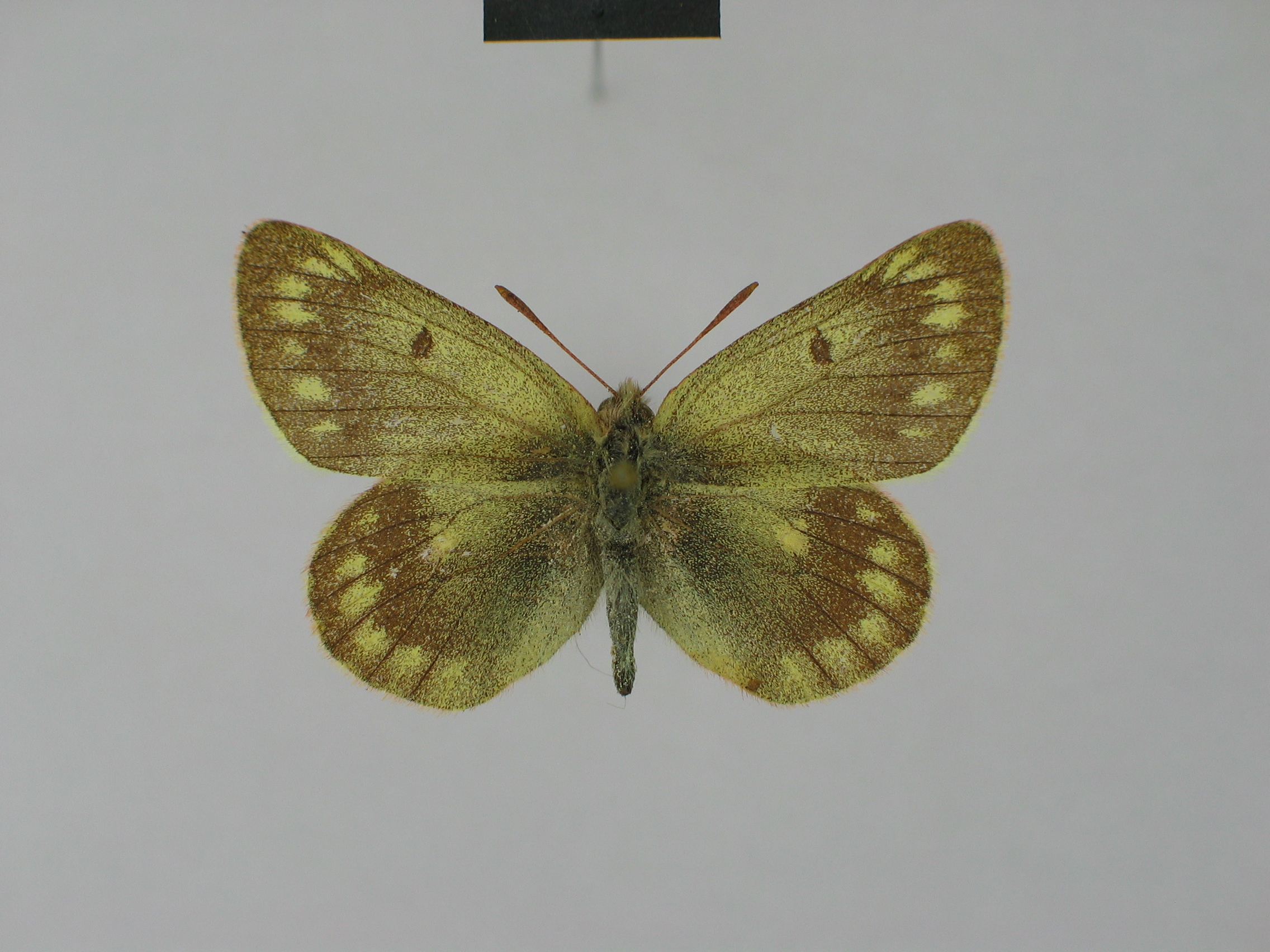
- Male
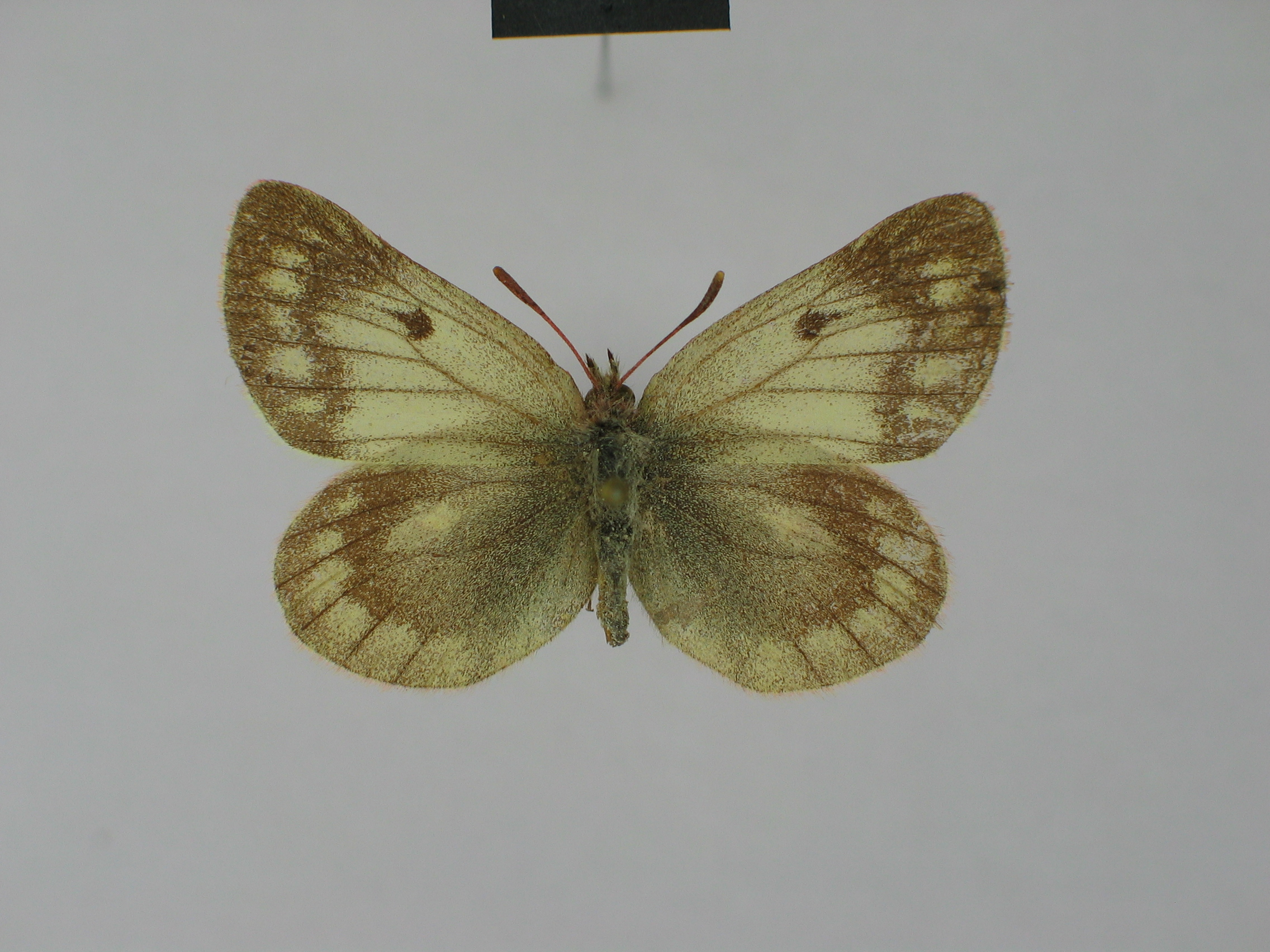
- Female

Scientific classification
- Kingdom: Animalia
- Phylum: Arthropoda
- Class: Insecta
- Order: Lepidoptera
- Family: Pieridae
- Genus: Colias
- Species: C. cocandica

Binomial name
- Colias cocandica Erschoff, 1874

Synonyms
- Colias cocandica mraceki Verhulst, 1999; Colias cocandica cocandica f. aurantiacomaculata O. Bang-Haas, 1915; Colias cocandica cocandica f. aurantiacopunctata Verity, [1909]; Colias cocandica cocandica f. brunneo-viridis O. Bang-Haas, 1915; Colias cocandica cocandica f. circumiens O. Bang-Haas, 1915; Colias cocandica ab. ♀ galba Grum-Grshimailo, 1893; Colias cocandica cocandica f. griseoviridis O. Bang-Haas, 1915; Colias eogene ab. hybrida Grum-Grshimailo, 1893; Colias cocandica cocandica f. immaculata O. Bang-Haas, 1915; Colias cocandica cocandica f. impunctata O. Bang-Haas, 1915; Colias cocandica cocandica f. integra Verity, 1911; Colias cocandica cocandica f. melanitica O. Bang-Haas, 1915; Colias cocandica cocandica f. minor O. Bang-Haas, 1915; Colias cocandica cocandica f. pupillata Stauder, 1924; Colias cocandica cocandica f. radiata O. Bang-Haas, 1915; Colias cocandica cocandica f. tatarica O. Bang-Haas, 1915; Colias cocandica cocandica f. viridis O. Bang-Haas, 1915; Colias cocandica cocandica f. xantha Kotzsch, 1936; Colias cocandica hinducucica f. culminicola Kotzsch, 1936; Colias cocandica maja f. obscura Austaut, 1898

= Colias cocandica =

Species of butterfly

Colias cocandica is a butterfly in the family Pieridae. It is found in Central Asia.

== Description ==
In the male greenish yellow above, dark-scaled, with black marginal and submarginal bands, and black middle spot on the forewing, the fringes and antenna being reddish. The underside of the forewing is greyish yellow, the apex being dusted with yellow, the middle spot and the small submarginal spots being black, and the costal and distal edges red; hindwing dark yellowish green, with broad yellowish distal margin, the reddish-edged middle spot being mother-of-pearl colour and the edge of the entire wing red. The female is dark yellowish white above, being paler beneath than the male and bearing stronger markings.

== Subspecies ==
- C. c. cocandica Tadzhikistan (Turkestan Range), Kirgizia (Fergana, E.Turkestan Range, Aksu Valley, Alai Mts.)
- C. c. hinducucica Verity, 1911 Afghanistan (Hindu Kush), Tadzhikistan (Pamirs)
- C. c. kunjerabi Verhulst, 1999 Pakistan (Karakorum)
- C. c. maja Grum-Grshimailo, 1891 Tian-Shan
- C. c. nastoides Verity, 1911 Alaisky Mts.
- C. c. pljushtchi Verhulst, 2000 Kirgizia (E.Tian Shan), Kazakhstan (Transili Ala Tau)
