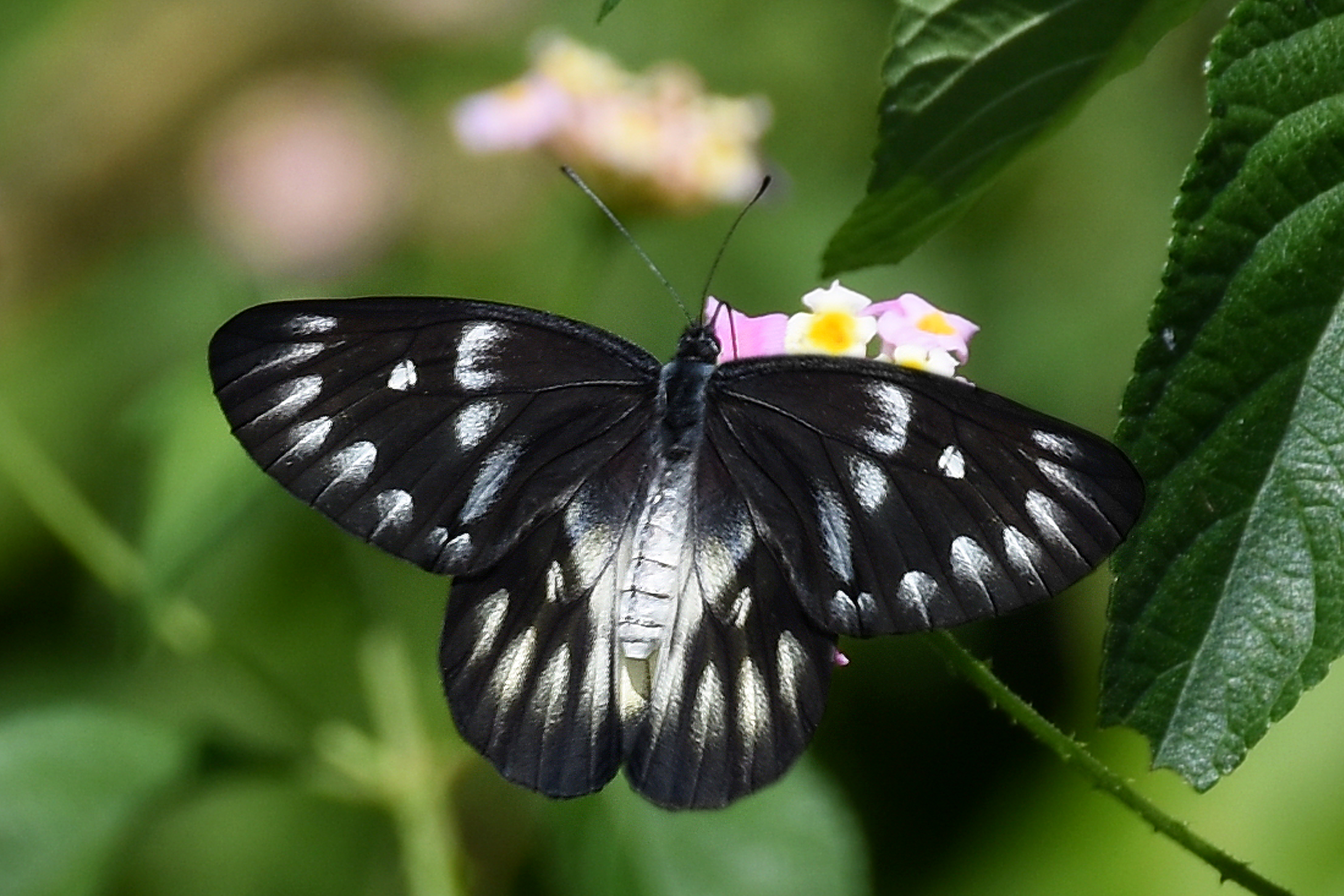
- Dorsal view
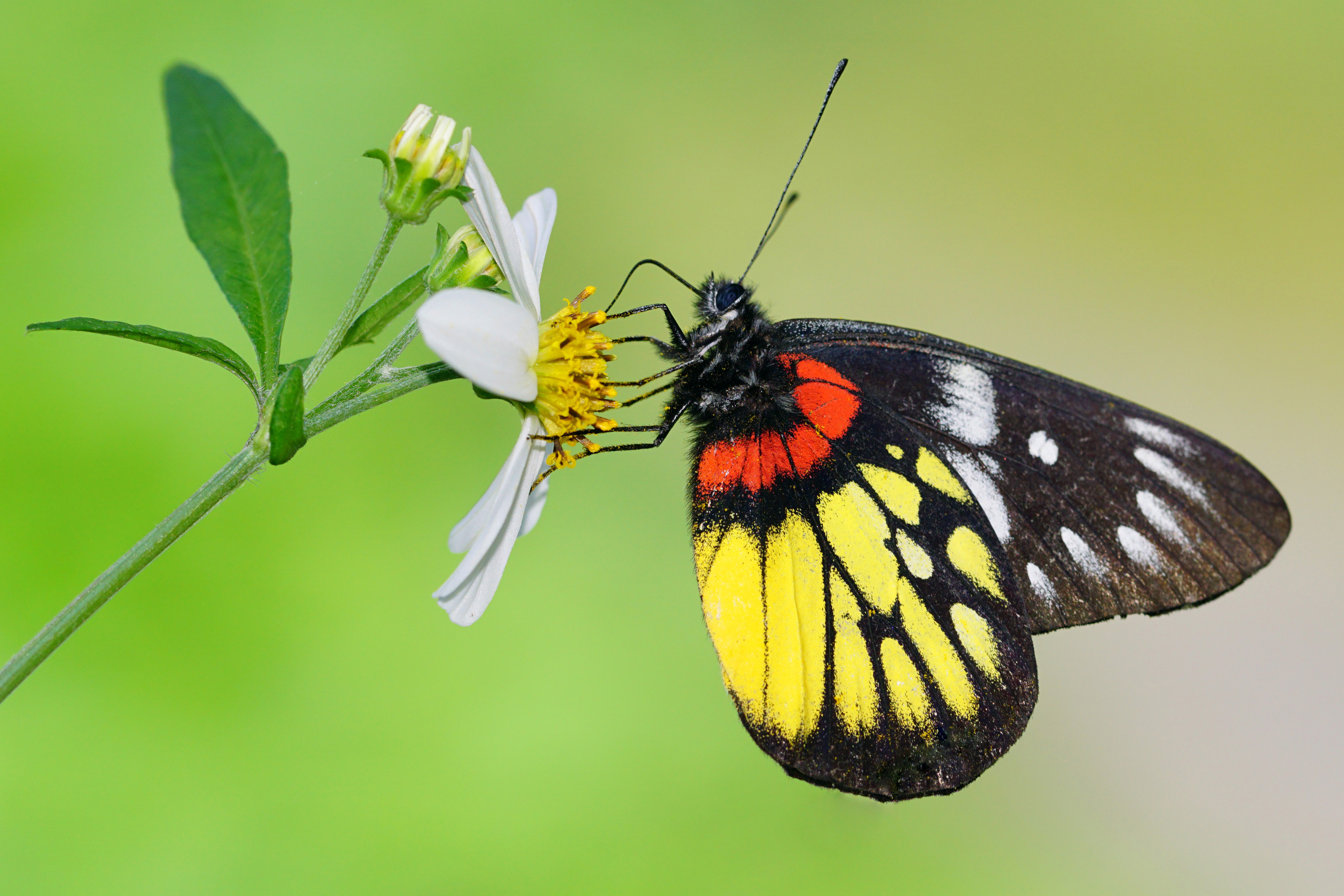
- Ventral view

Scientific classification
- Kingdom: Animalia
- Phylum: Arthropoda
- Class: Insecta
- Order: Lepidoptera
- Family: Pieridae
- Genus: Delias
- Species: D. pasithoe

Binomial name
- Delias pasithoe (Linnaeus, 1767)

Synonyms
- Delias aglaia (Linnaeus, 1758) (non Linnaeus, 1758: preoccupied); Papilio aglaia Linnaeus, 1758 (non Linnaeus, 1758: preoccupied)

= Delias pasithoe =

Redbase Jezebel

Species of butterfly

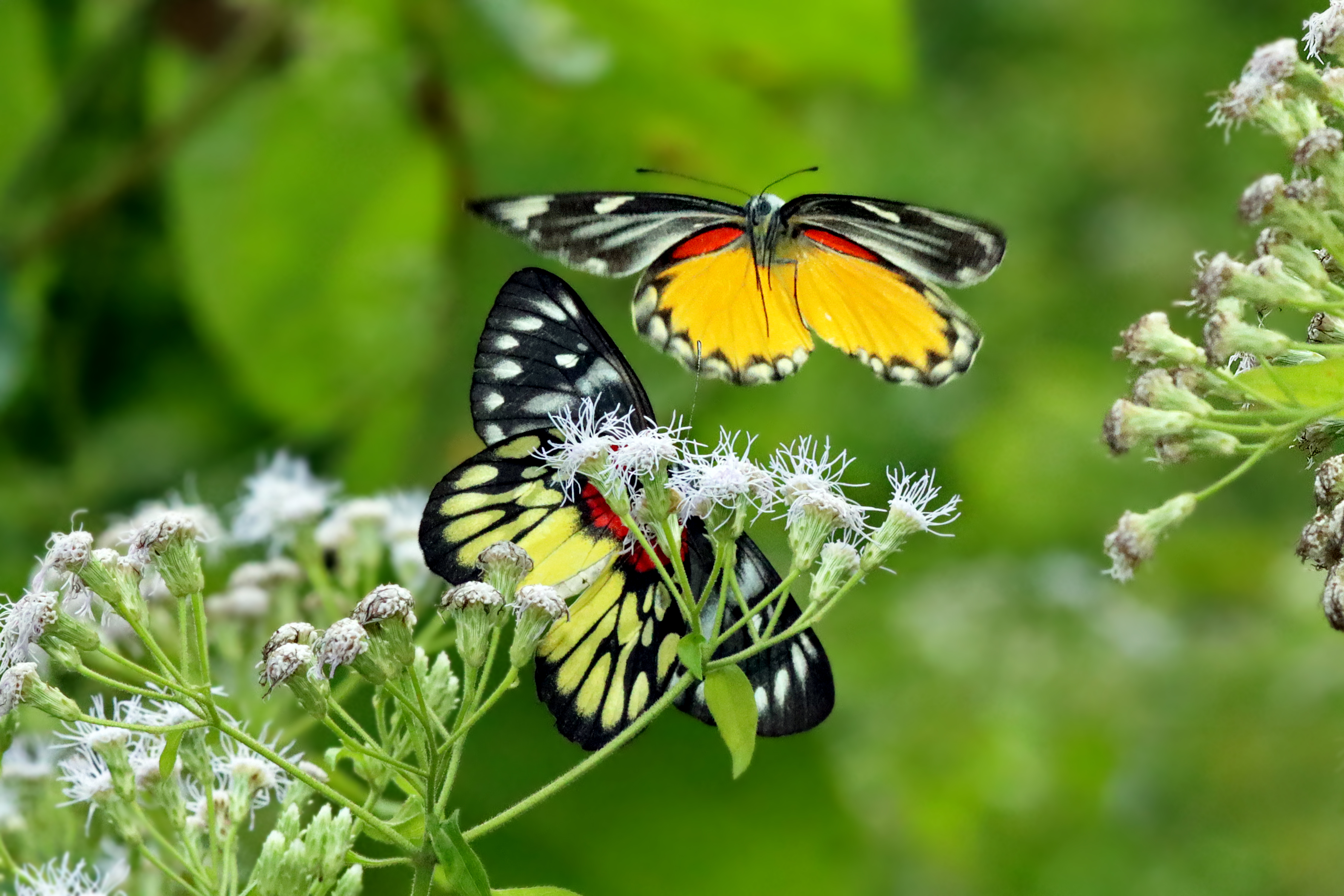
Delias pasithoe with Delias descombesi

Delias pasithoe, the redbase Jezebel is a medium-sized butterfly of the family Pieridae, that is, the yellows and whites. The species is found in parts of South Asia and Southeast Asia. There has been some dispute for which species the specific name aglaja (or aglaia), used twice by Linnaeus in 1758, applies – the redbase Jezebel, or the dark green fritillary (Speyeria aglaja), a brush-footed butterfly. Here, Delias pasithoe is used for the redbase Jezebel, based on the replacement name proposed by Linnaeus himself.

== Description ==
=== Male ===
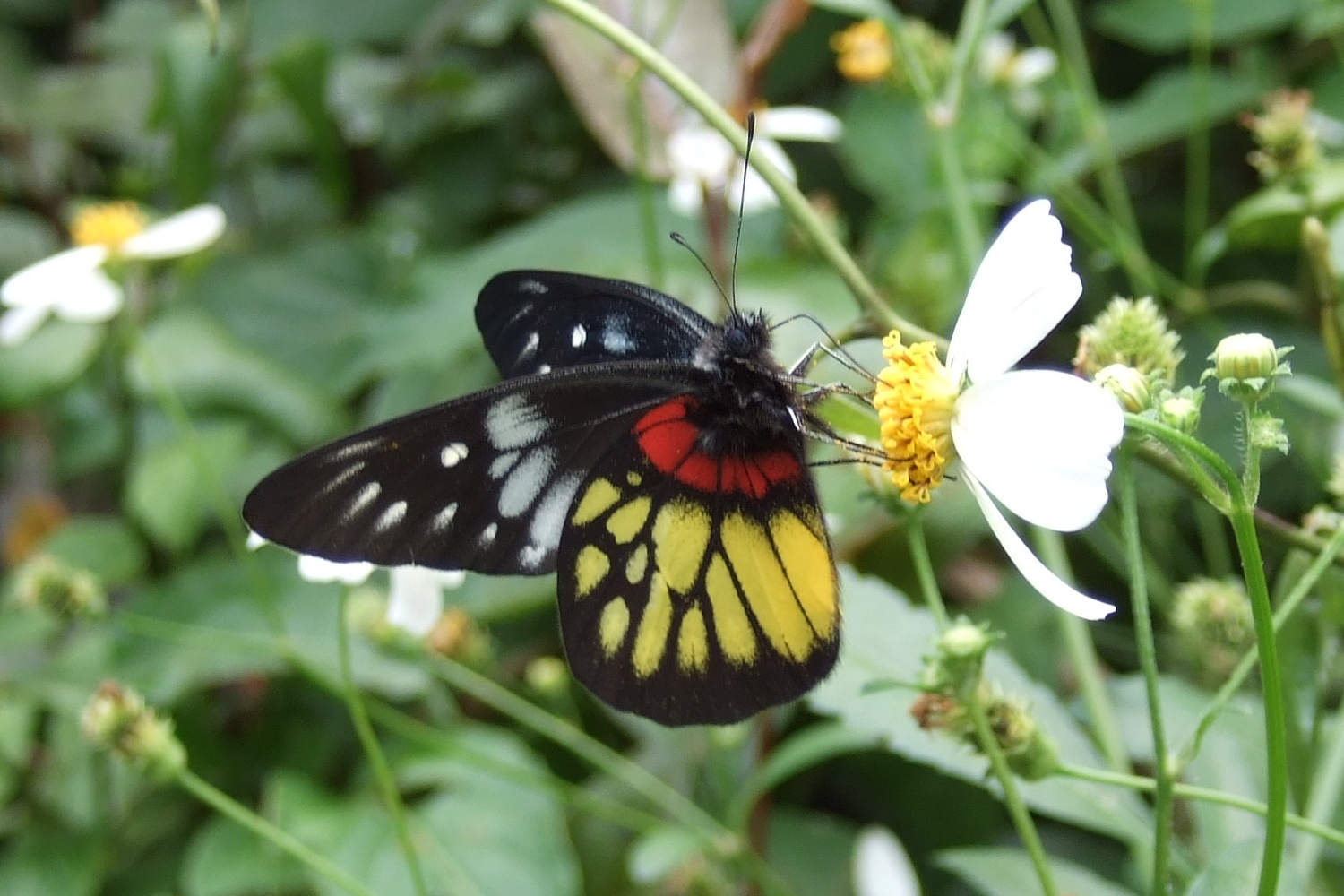
Delias pasithoe from Taiwan

Upperside: black. Forewing with more or less distinct, somewhat diffuse, broad streaks from base, in the discoidal cell and interspaces 1 and 2, the streak in the last the most produced; a white oval spot at lower apex of cell traversed by the lower discocellular, followed by a subterminal series of greyish-white hastate (spear-shaped) markings with their points turned inwards, the markings opposite the apex of the wing elongate and shifted a little inwards. Hindwing: a broad subbasal transverse greyish-white band merged posteriorly in a large bright yellow dorsal patch that fills the apical two-thirds, the extreme apex excepted, of interspaces 1a, 1, and of 2; a white transversely elongate spot along the middle discocellular, and beyond it a postdiscal curved series of greyish-white elongate hastate spots in interspaces 3 to 7.

Underside: black. Forewing: somewhat elongate greyish-white markings in interspaces 1, 2, 3 and in cell, formed into a conspicuous oblique broad bar across the middle of the wing; a white spot at lower apex of cell and a postdiscal series of hastate spots as on the upperside. Hindwing: black, a rich dark crimson patch at base, a yellow dorsal patch as on the upperside but darker; the apical two-thirds of the cell, three spots above it and one below at bases of interspaces 3, 6 and 7 respectively and a curved discal series of elongate spots beyond apex of cell, rich chrome-yellow; of these latter spots the spot in interspace 5 is much the longest. Antennae, head, thorax and abdomen above black, abdomen on the sides and below grey.

=== Female ===
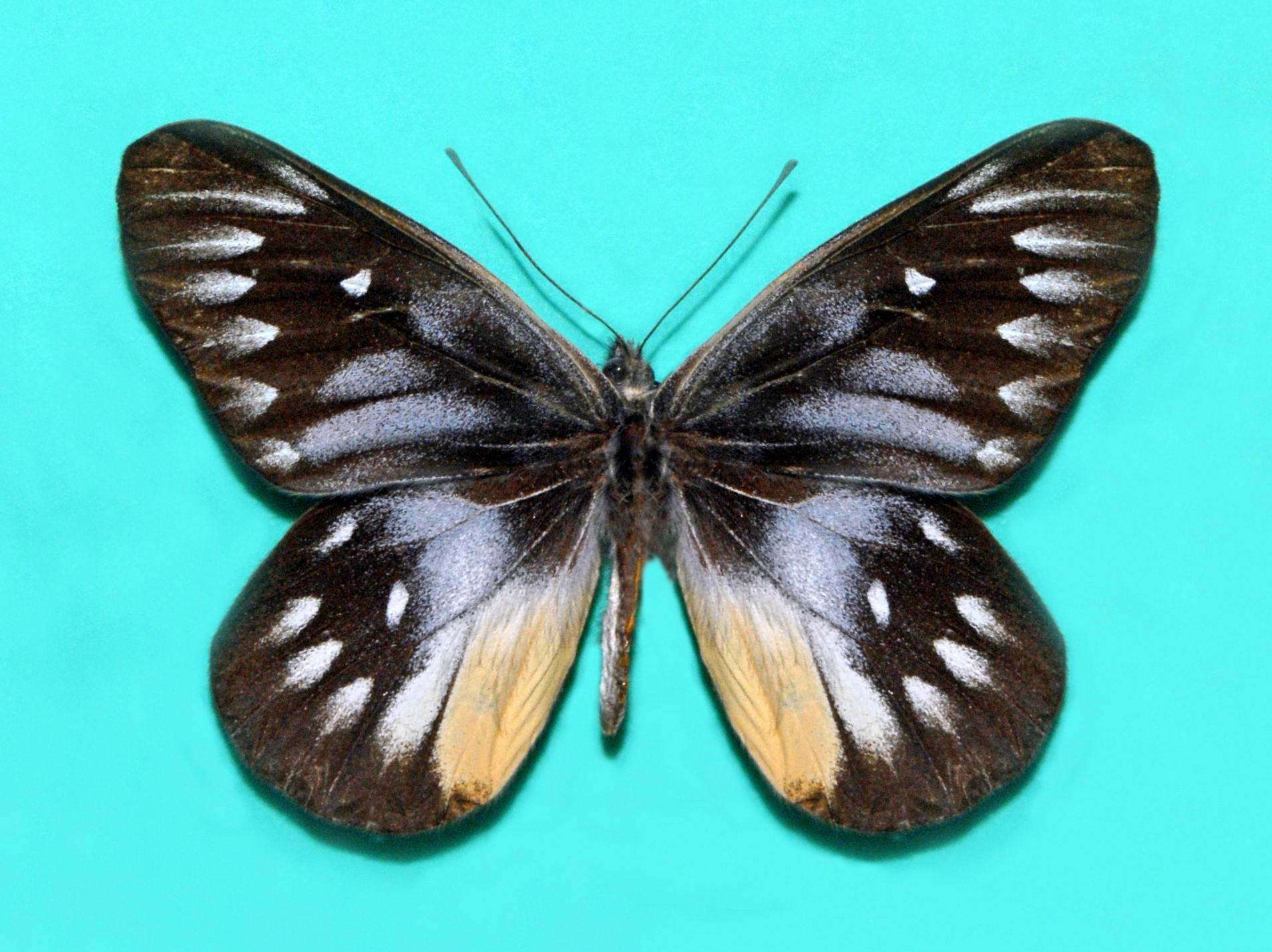
Upperside of Delias pasithoe - mounted specimen

Upperside: brownish black. Forewing: markings as in the male, but the cellular streak and the streaks in interspaces 1 and 2 below the cell short and formed into a broken oblique broad greyish-white band across the wing. Hindwing: markings similar to those in the male, but the basal crimson patch of the underside seen through by transparency, the transverse broad subbasal band and dorsal patch both pale yellow and much broader than in the male, and the postdiscal curved series of hastate spots obscure and ill-defined. Antennae, head, thorax and abdomen as in the male, the abdomen whitish grey below and on the sides.

Wingspan is 66–90 mm.

== Distribution ==
Nepal; Sikkim; Assam; Myanmar; Tenasserim; to the south extending through the Malay Peninsula to Borneo; to the east through the Shan States to Thailand and southern China.

== Life history ==
=== Food plants ===
Buddleja, Camellia sinensis, Citrus maxima, Dendrophthoe glabrescens, Loranthus parasiticus, Loranthus pentandrus, Loranthus yadoriki, Nauclea rotundifolia, Santalum album, Taxillus chinensis, Taxillus limprichtii, Taxillus nigrans and Taxillus parasiticus.

=== Larva ===
Brownish red, each segment with a transverse row of long bristles, The outer bristles black, the middle yellow. Length about 2 inches. Found in March feeding on the young leaves of the binga tree (Nauclea rotundifolia).

=== Pupa ===
Very dark reddish brown or black, smooth, sinuate; head with three sharp points and a broad truncation in front; segments of the abdomen and the front with small acute tubercular projections.

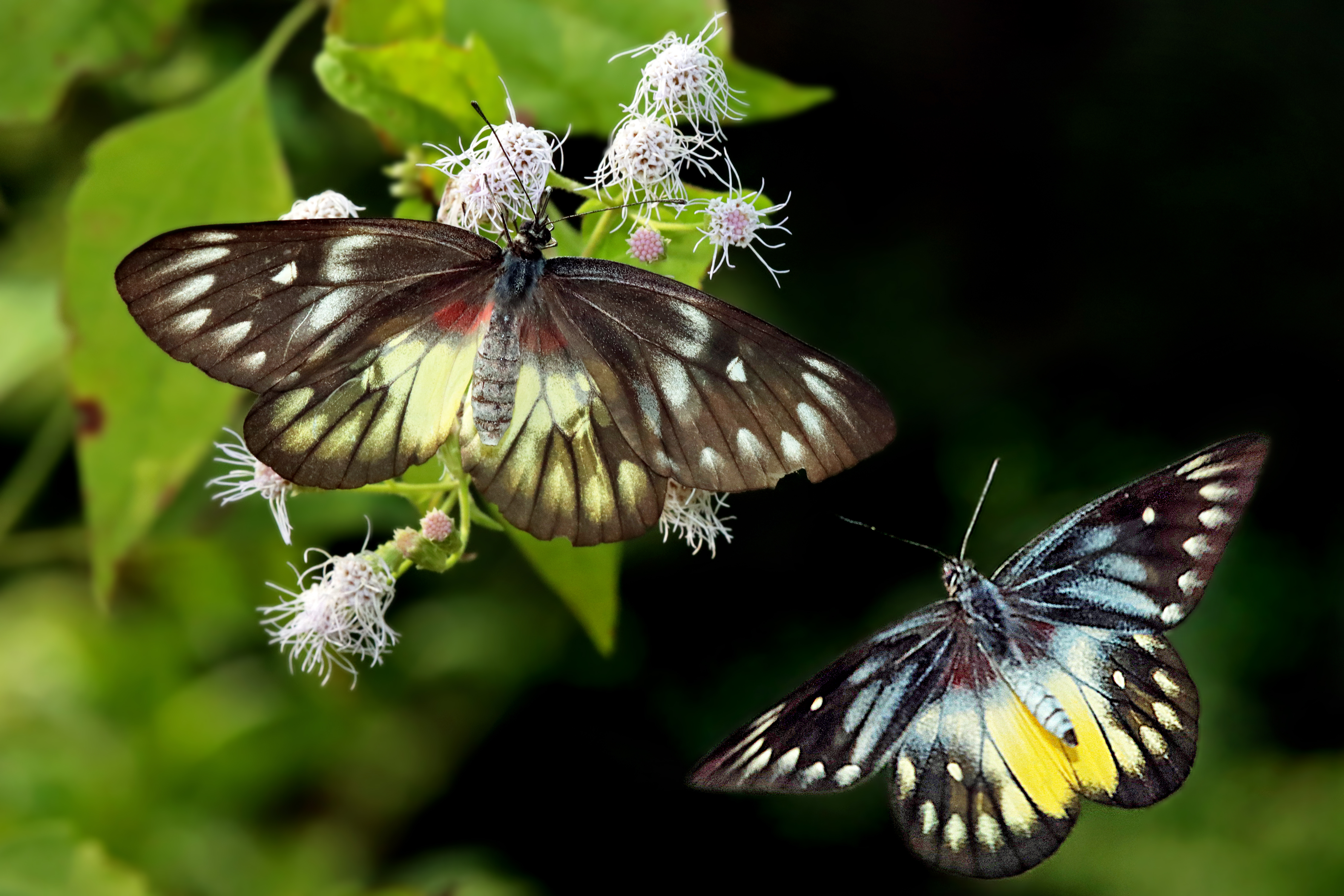
Male (left) and female (right)

== See also ==
- Pieridae
- List of butterflies of India
- List of butterflies of India (Pieridae)
