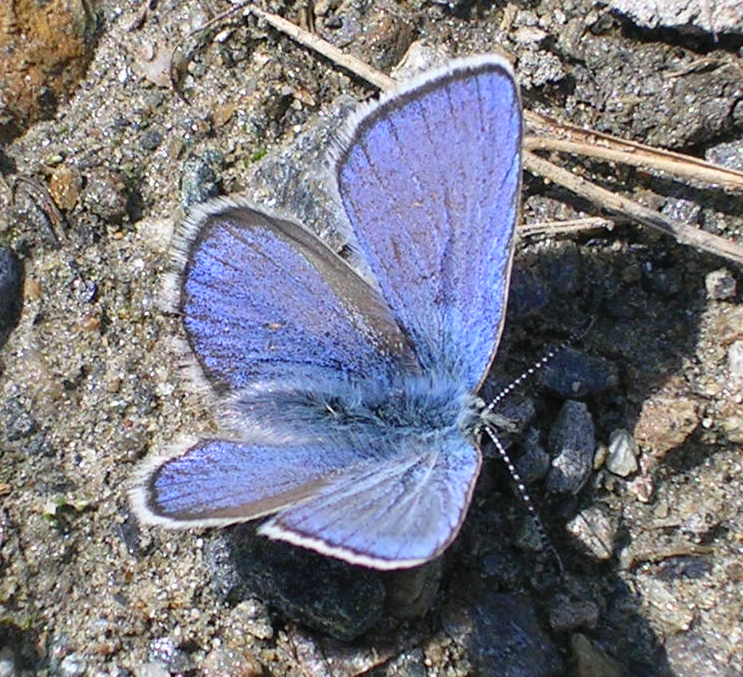

Scientific classification
- Domain: Eukaryota
- Kingdom: Animalia
- Phylum: Arthropoda
- Class: Insecta
- Order: Lepidoptera
- Family: Lycaenidae
- Genus: Agriades
- Species: A. orbitulus

Binomial name
- Agriades orbitulus (Prunner, 1798)

Synonyms
- Papilio orbitulus de Prunner, 1798; Albulina orbitulus; Plebejus orbitulus; Plebeius orbitulus; Papilio pheretes Hübner, 1805; Albulina pheretes

= Agriades orbitulus =

Species of butterfly

Agriades orbitulus, the alpine argus, is a butterfly of the family Lycaenidae. It is a high altitude species found in the Alps (ranging from the French Alps to Slovenia and Austria), the mountains of Norway and Sweden, the Urals, the Himalayas and across central Asia.

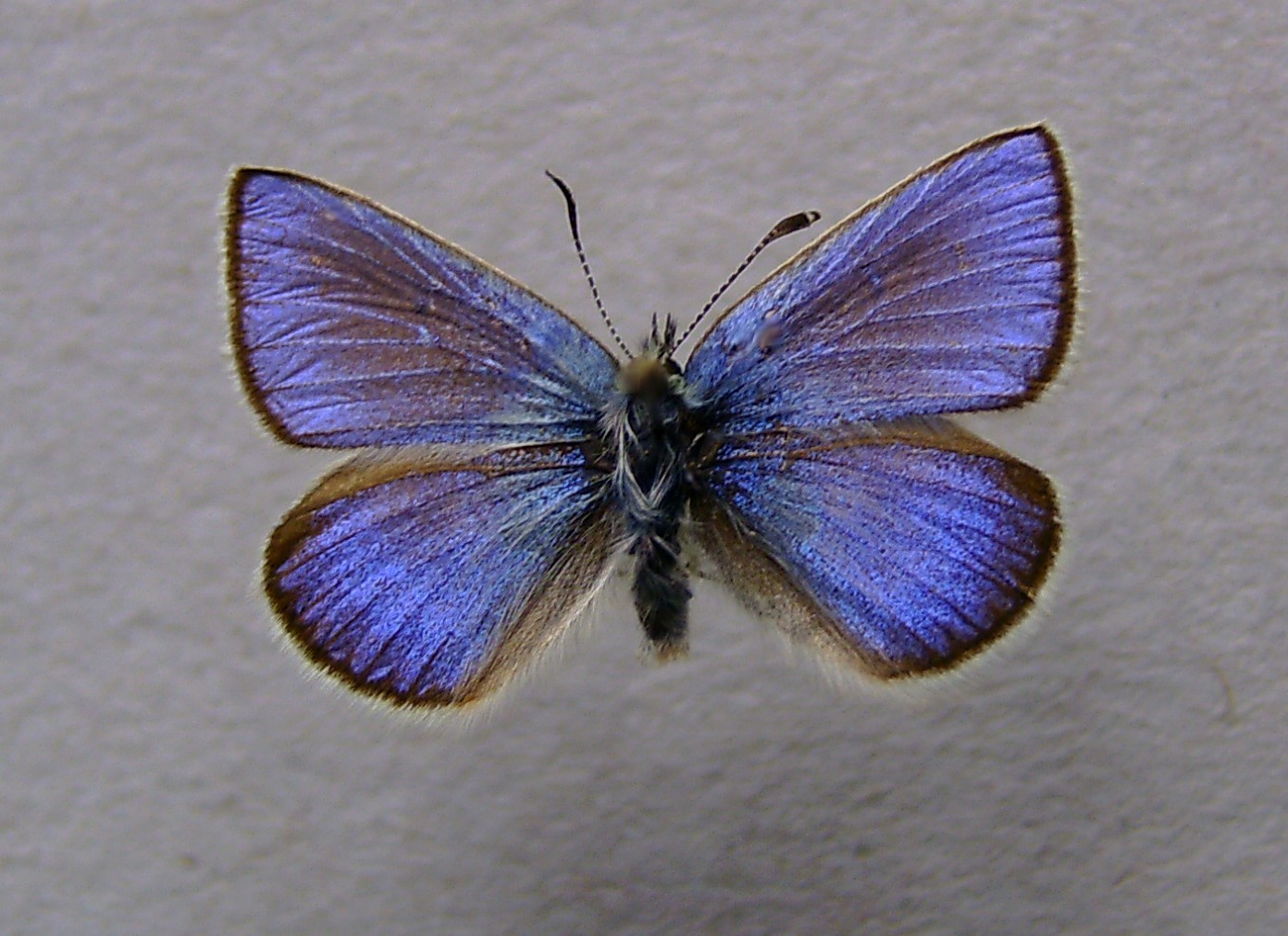
Mounted

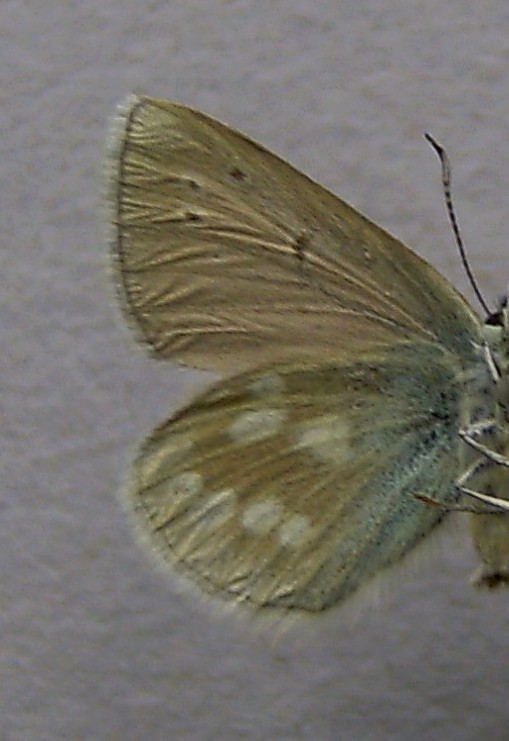
Underside

== Description ==
The wingspan is 25–30 mm. The male upperside varies from sky blue to a greyish or steely blue, and is unmarked apart from the narrow black borders and white fringes. The female is brown, often with a slight blue dust suffusion at the wing bases. The fore-wings end in a very pointed apex. Both sexes are clearly assigned by conspicuous white spots on the otherwise pale greyish brown or beige wing underside. The spots under the hind-wing are pure white and lack black centres. The butterfly flies from June to August depending on the location.

== Ecology ==
The larvae feed on several species of Astragalus (A. alpinus, A. australis, A. frigidus, A. norvegicus and A. penduliflorus), two species of Oxytropis (O. campestris and O. montana) and on Hedysarum hedysaroides.

== Subspecies ==
Subspecies include:

- A. o. orbitulus (Prunner, 1798)
- A. o. luxurians (Forster, 1940)
- A. o. lobbichleri (Forster, 1961)
- A. o. tatsienluica (Oberthür, 1910)
- A. o. major (Evans, 1915)
- A. o. pheretimus (Staudinger, 1892)
- A. o. sajana (Rühl, 1895)
- A. o. tyrone (Forster, 1940)
- A. o. shanxiensis Murayama, 1983
- A. o. tibetana (D'Abrera, 1993)
- A. o. qinlingensis (Wang, 1998)
- A. o. demulaensis (Huang, 2001)
- A. o. dongdalaensis (Huang, 2001)
- A. o. litangensis (Huang, 2001)
- A. o. jugnei (Churkin, 2004)
