= Coleophora svenssoni =

Scientific classification
- Kingdom: Animalia
- Phylum: Arthropoda
- Clade: Pancrustacea
- Class: Insecta
- Order: Lepidoptera
- Family: Coleophoridae
- Genus: Coleophora
- Species: C. svenssoni

Binomial name
- Coleophora svenssoni Baldizzone, 1985

Synonyms
- Amseliphora seghedinii Nemes, 2004

Species of moth

Coleophora svenssoni is a moth of the family Coleophoridae. It is found in Lapland, the Alps and the Carpathian Mountains.

The larvae feed on Astragalus alpinus, Astragalus frigidus, Hedysarum hedysaroides and Oxytropis halleri.
