= Phaca alpina =

Phaca alpina can refer to the following plant species:

- Phaca alpina (L.) Piper, a synonym of Astragalus alpinus L.
- Phaca alpina O.F.Müll., a synonym of Astragalus frigidus (L.) A.Gray
- Phaca alpina L., a synonym of Astragalus penduliflorus Lam.
