= Norvegicus =

Norvegicus may refer to:

- Astragalus norvegicus, species of flowering plant
- Bombus norvegicus, species of cuckoo bumblebee
- Enterovibrio norvegicus, species of bacteria
- Nephrops norvegicus, species of shrimp
- Rattus norvegicus, species of rat
- Rattus norvegicus domestica, species of rat
- Sebastes norvegicus, species of marine ray-finned fish
- Zeugopterus norvegicus, species of turbot

== See also ==
- Rattus Norvegicus (album)
