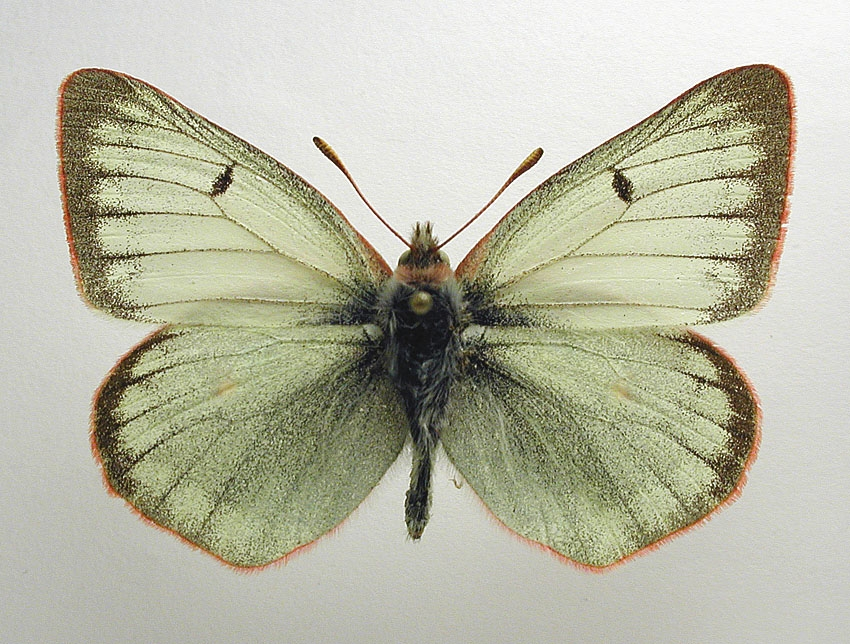
- Female
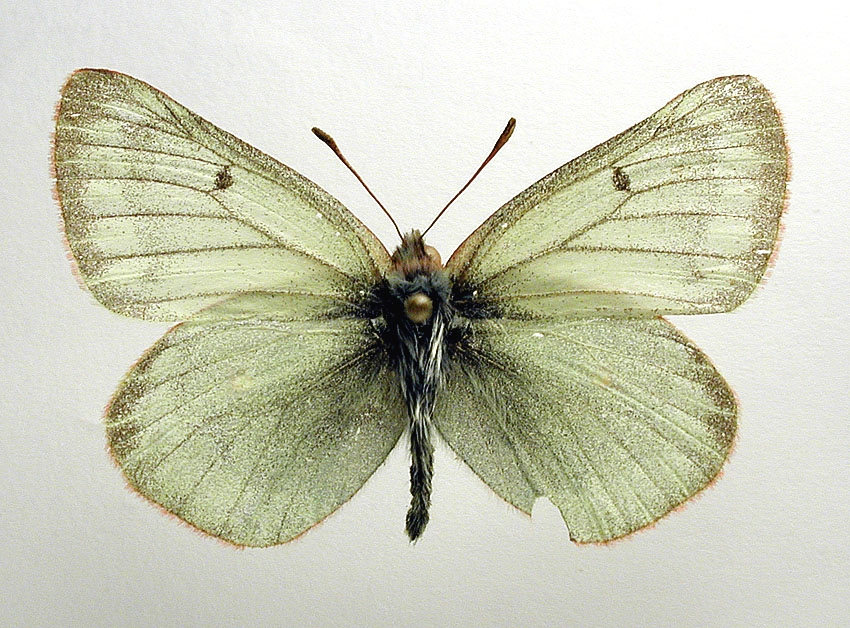
- Male

Scientific classification
- Kingdom: Animalia
- Phylum: Arthropoda
- Class: Insecta
- Order: Lepidoptera
- Family: Pieridae
- Genus: Colias
- Species: C. tyche

Binomial name
- Colias tyche (de Böber, 1812)

Synonyms
- Colias melinos Eversmann, 1847

= Colias tyche =

Booth's sulphur

Species of butterfly

Colias tyche, the Booth's sulphur or pale Arctic clouded yellow, is a butterfly in the family Pieridae. It is found from Baffin Island west along the Hudson Bay and arctic coasts of the Nunavut and Northwest Territories mainland and the southern tier of Arctic Islands to northern Yukon, Alaska, and Eurasia.

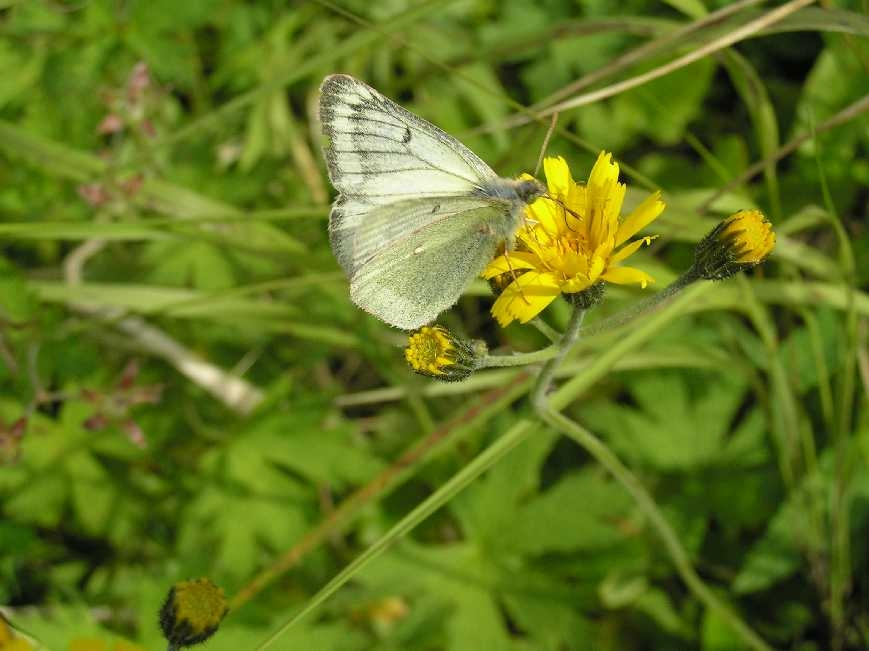

== Description ==
The wingspan is 28–43 mm. is a small to medium-sized Colias butterfly with pale green to greenish-white or greenish-yellow wings, more or less suffused with grey-green in the basal part of the hindwings and very visible brown veins. The dark borders are wider in the female and encompass a submarginal line of pale yellow spots bordered with black in the male, black spotted with yellow in the female. Colias philodice vitabunda females are often white.The underside is greenish very marked with dark scales.

== Biology ==
The butterfly flies in June to August depending on the location.

The larvae feed on legume species.

== Subspecies ==
- C. t. tyche (northern Eurasia)
- C. t. antonkozlovi Yakovlev, 2020 (Russia, Northern Siberia, Taimyr Peninsula, Plateau Putorana)
- C. t. relicta Kurentzov, 1970 (Chukot Peninsula, Far East)
- C. t. werdandi Zetterstedt, 1839 (northern Europe)
- C. t. magadanica Churkin, Grieshuber, Bogdanov & Zamolodchikov, 2001 (Magadan)
- C. t. flinti Churkin, Grieshuber, Bogdanov & Zamolodchikov, 2001 (Wrangel Island)
- C. t. olga Churkin, Grieshuber, Bogdanov & Zamolodchikov, 2001 (East Chukotka)
- C. t. boothii Curtis, 1835 (Northwest Territories, Yukon, Baffin Island, Victoria Island, Banks Island, Alaska)
- C. t. thula Hovanitz, 1955 (Alaska and in Canada on Banks, Victoria and Melville Islands) may be a full species.

Both of the Nearctic subspecies C. t. boothii (Booth's sulphur) and C. t. thula (Thula sulphur) are treated as valid species by some authors.

== Similar species ==
- Hecla sulphur (C. hecla)
- Labrador sulphur (C. nastes)

== Etymology ==
Named in the Classical tradition. Tyche is the deity of chance and luck in Greek mythology.
