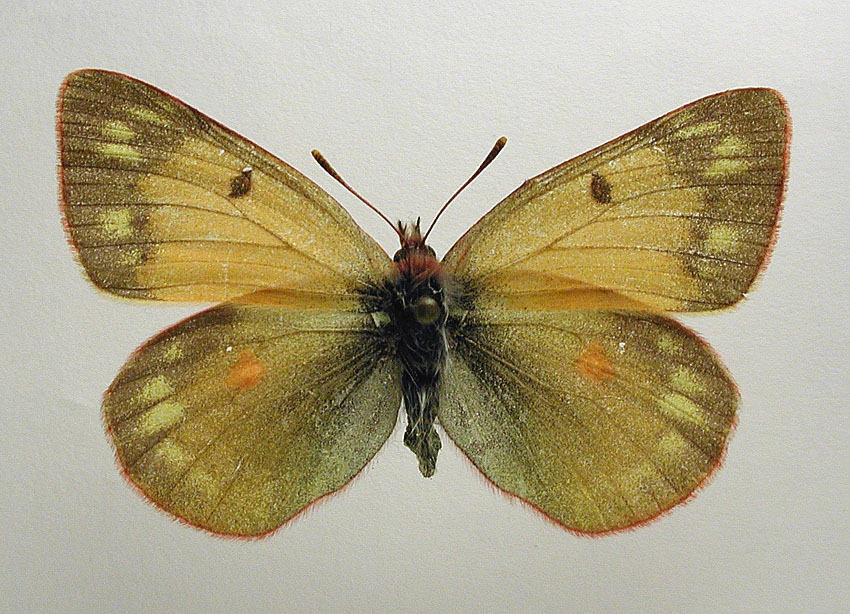
- Female
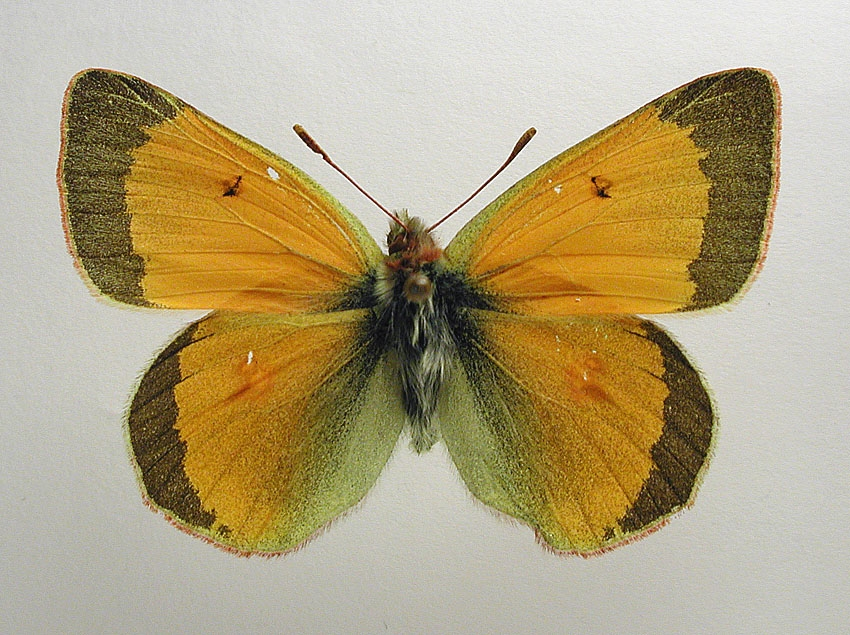
- Male

Scientific classification
- Kingdom: Animalia
- Phylum: Arthropoda
- Clade: Pancrustacea
- Class: Insecta
- Order: Lepidoptera
- Family: Pieridae
- Genus: Colias
- Species: C. hecla

Binomial name
- Colias hecla Lefèbvre, 1836

Synonyms
- Eurymus hecla Dyar, 1903; Colias groenlandica Lampa, 1893

= Colias hecla =

Species of butterfly

Colias hecla, the northern clouded yellow or hecla sulphur, is a butterfly in the family Pieridae. In Europe, it is found in the northern part of Norway, Sweden and Finland up to heights of 900 m. It is also found in Greenland, Alaska, the Northwest Territories, Yukon, Quebec, Labrador, Manitoba, the Chukot region, eastern Chukotka, and the Russian Far East.

The wingspan is 36–46 mm. In the female, the black band along the edges of the wings is cut through with numerous yellow "windows", and not solid, as in the male. The species was described from Greenland, where, besides it, other Colias are not found.

The butterfly flies in June to August depending on the location. It is found in moist tundras.

The larvae feed on Astragalus species, including Astragalus frigidus and Astragalus alpinus as well as Trifolium repens. They are also known to feed on Salix arctica where Astragalus are absent.

== Subspecies ==
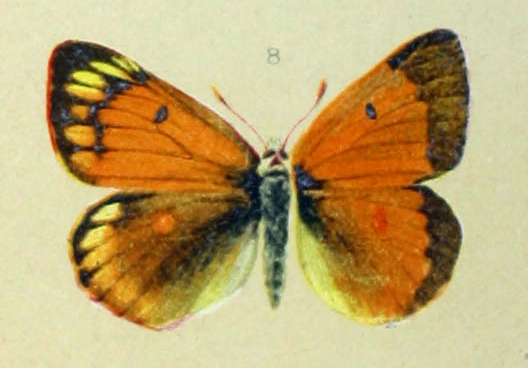
C. h. sulitelma

- C. h. aquilonaris Grum-Grshimailo, 1900 – Russia (Chukot region, Far East)
- C. h. hecla Lefèbvre, 1836 – USA (Alaska), Canada (Northwest Territories, Yukon, Quebec, Labrador), Denmark (Greenland)
- C. h. hela Strecker, 1880 – Canada (Manitoba, Northwest Territories)
- C. h. sulitelma Aurivillius, 1890 – Sweden, Norway, Russia (northwestern Siberia)
- C. h. zamolodchikovi Ménétriés, 1859 – Russia (Chukotka)
- C. h. viluiensis Ménétries, 1859 – Russia (Siberia: Transbaikal)

Note: Colias hecla chilkana Austaut, 1898 and others are treated as valid subspecies in some schemes.

Note: C. h. viluiensis is sometimes treated as a separate species Colias viluiensis.

Note: C. h. sulitelma is sometimes treated as a separate species Colias sulitelma. If that is the case, C. h. zamolodchikovi is considered a subspecies of Colias sulitelma, named Colias sulitelma zamolodchikovi.

Furthermore, Colias canadensis is sometimes treated as a subspecies of Colias hecla, named C. h. canadensis.
