= Astragalus secundus =

Astragalus secundus can refer to the following plant species:

- Astragalus secundus DC., a synonym of Astragalus frigidus (L.) A.Gray
- Astragalus secundus Michx., a synonym of Astragalus alpinus L. var. alpinus
