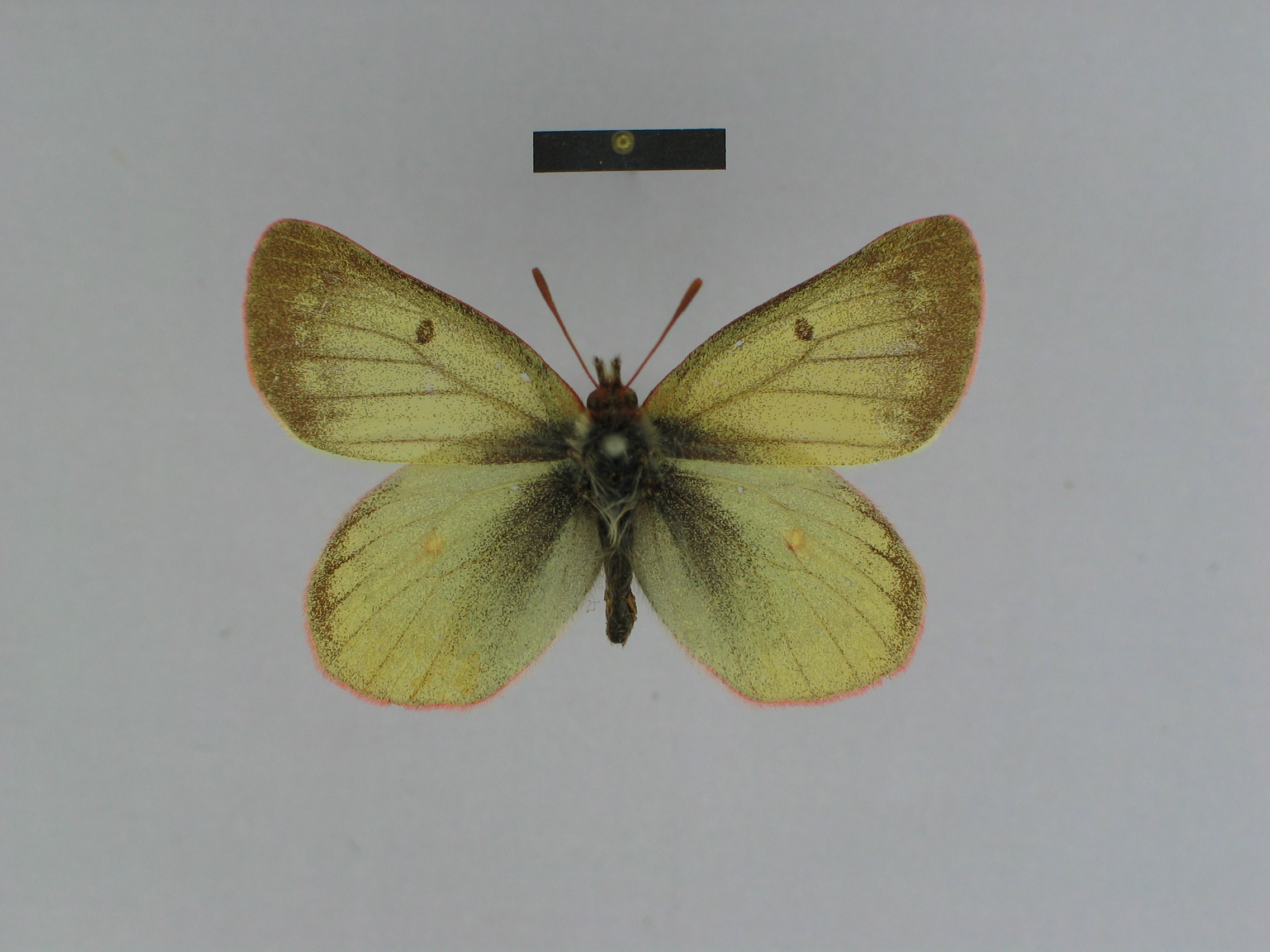

Conservation status
- Secure (NatureServe)

Scientific classification
- Kingdom: Animalia
- Phylum: Arthropoda
- Clade: Pancrustacea
- Class: Insecta
- Order: Lepidoptera
- Family: Pieridae
- Genus: Colias
- Species: C. nastes

Binomial name
- Colias nastes Boisduval, 1832

= Colias nastes =

Species of butterfly

Colias nastes, the Labrador sulphur, is a butterfly in the family Pieridae. In Europe, it is found in the north of Norway and Sweden and on rare occasions in northern Finland. It is also found in North America, specifically in Alaska, Canada, and the Rocky Mountains, Washington, Montana and on Greenland. In Asia, it is found in the Altai Mountains, the border regions of Russia, China, Mongolia, Kazakhstan, the Sayan Mountains, the north of Siberia, and in the Chukotka Autonomous Okrug.

== Description ==
The wingspan is 31–45 mm. C. nastes is dark grey green with grey-black margins and red fringes. The female is more yellowish and has more distinct yellowish submarginal spots on both wings. The under surface of the forewing is impure whitish, with greenish-yellow scales, the rose-red fringes are conspicuous, the hindwing is yellowish green, lighter at the margin, the white median spot is bordered with red and distally to it is placed a diffuse red spot, the rose-red fringes are broader than on the forewing. The female has a somewhat lighter under surface and on the forewing some small black submarginal spots.

== Biology ==
The butterfly flies from May to August depending on the location.

The larvae feed on Astragalus species, especially A. alpinus and A. frigidus. In North America it is also recorded on Trifolium repens and possibly Vaccinium species.

== Subspecies ==
- C. n. nastes Altai, Sayan, Chukot Peninsula, Alaska, Greenland, Labrador, Greenland.
- C. n. aliaska O. Bang-Haas, 1927 Alaska, Canada (Yukon, Northwest Territories, Victoria Island, Banks Island)
- C. n. dezhnevi Korshunov, 1996 NE.Siberia (Magadan, Chukotka, Bilibino)
- C. n. dioni Verhulst, 1999 Canada (Alberta)
- C. n. jakutica Kurentzov, 1970 Russian Far East (Yakutia)
- C. n. moina Strecker, 1880 Canada (Northwest Territories, Manitoba)
- C. n. nlakapamux Jakubek & Kir'yanov, 2021 Canada (SW British Columbia, Coast Mts.), USA ( NW Washington), ref.: ATALANTA, 52.Band, Heft 1/2, April/2021, ISSN 0171-0079
- C. n. tagish Jakubek & Kir'yanov, 2021 Canada (SW Yukon, Montana Mountain Massif), ref.: ATALANTA, 52.Band, Heft 1/2, April/2021, ISSN 0171-0079
- C. n. kwanlindun Jakubek & Kir'yanov, 2021 Canada ( Yukon, E Boundary Mountain Ranges), ref.: ATALANTA, 52.Band, Heft 1/2, April/2021, ISSN 0171-0079
- C. n. muskwa Jakubek & Kir'yanov, 2021 Canada (N British Columbia, Northern Boreal Mts.), ref.: ATALANTA, 52.Band, Heft 1/2, April/2021, ISSN 0171-0079
- C. n. ogilviensis Jakubek & Kir'yanov, 2021 Canada (N Yukon, Ogilvie Mts.), ref.: ATALANTA, 52.Band, Heft 1/2, April/2021, ISSN 0171-0079
- C. n. donjek Jakubek & Kir'yanov, 2021 Canada (W Yukon, N Saint Elias Mts.), ref.: ATALANTA, 52.Band, Heft 1/2, April/2021, ISSN 0171-0079
- C. n. streckeri Grum-Grshimailo, 1895 Canada (Alberta, British Columbia), N.Washington, Montana
- C. n. zemblica Verity, 1911 Novaja Zemlja
- C. n. cocandicides Verity, 1911
- C. n. ferrisi Verhulst, 2004 Alaska
- C. n. mongola Alpheraky, 1897
