= Enterovibrio =

Scientific classification
- Domain: Bacteria
- Kingdom: Pseudomonadati
- Phylum: Pseudomonadota
- Class: Gammaproteobacteria
- Order: Vibrionales
- Family: Vibrionaceae
- Genus: Enterovibrio; Thompson et al. 2002

Species
- Ca. E. altilux E. baiacu E. calviensis E. coralii Ca. E. escacola Ca. E. escicola Ca. E. luxaltus E. nigricans E. norvegicus E. pacificus

Genus of bacteria

Enterovibrio is a genus of bacteria from the family of Vibrionaceae.
