= Colias aquilonaris =

Scientific classification
- Kingdom: Animalia
- Phylum: Arthropoda
- Clade: Pancrustacea
- Class: Insecta
- Order: Lepidoptera
- Family: Pieridae
- Genus: Colias
- Species: C. aquilonaris

Binomial name
- Colias aquilonaris Grum-Grshimailo, 1892

Species of butterfly

Colias aquilonaris is a butterfly in the family Pieridae found only on the Chukchi Peninsula in the Russian Far East and along the valleys of the rivers Olenyok and Yana (north-eastern Siberia).

== Description ==
Upperside of male golden yellow, with black-brown distal margin, the middle spot small, often almost absent, middle spot of hindwing large and red, costa and fringes of forewing rosy red; underside of forewing golden yellow, lighter at the distal margin, dusted with black, the submarginal spots blackish, small or nearly wanting; hindwing ochre-yellow, dusted with blackish, greenish at base, the double middle spot silvery white, broadly edged with reddish brown. The female above shaded with greenish black at the costa and base of forewing, the broad black-brown distal margin bears small sulphur-yellow spots; hindwing darkened, blackish in middle, the sulphur-yellow submarginal spots small, the middle spot large, golden yellow; the underside olive- or ochre-yellow, middle of forewing light golden yellow, the hindwing sparsely dusted with brownish and greenish scaling

== Biology ==
The butterfly flies in July.

== Taxonomy ==
Subspecies of Colias viluiensis Menetries, 1859
