= Enterovibrio nigricans =

Scientific classification
- Domain: Bacteria
- Kingdom: Pseudomonadati
- Phylum: Pseudomonadota
- Class: Gammaproteobacteria
- Order: Vibrionales
- Family: Vibrionaceae
- Genus: Enterovibrio
- Species: E. nigricans

Binomial name
- Enterovibrio nigricans Pascual et al. 2009

Type strain
- DAl 1-1-5

Species of bacterium

Enterovibrio nigricans is a bacterium species from the genus of Enterovibrio which has been isolated from the head kidney of the fish Sparus aurata from the Mediterranean coast in Spain.
