= Enterovibrio baiacu =

Scientific classification
- Domain: Bacteria
- Kingdom: Pseudomonadati
- Phylum: Pseudomonadota
- Class: Gammaproteobacteria
- Order: Vibrionales
- Family: Vibrionaceae
- Genus: Enterovibrio
- Species: E. baiacu

Binomial name
- Enterovibrio baiacu Azevedo et al. 2020

Type strain
- A649

Species of bacterium

Enterovibrio baiacu is a bacterium species from the genus of Enterovibrio which has been isolated from the viscera of a pufferfish (Sphoeroides spengleri).
