= Enterovibrio coralii =

Scientific classification
- Domain: Bacteria
- Kingdom: Pseudomonadati
- Phylum: Pseudomonadota
- Class: Gammaproteobacteria
- Order: Vibrionales
- Family: Vibrionaceae
- Genus: Enterovibrio
- Species: E. coralii

Binomial name
- Enterovibrio coralii Thompson et al. 2005

Type strain
- CC17

Species of bacterium

Enterovibrio coralii is a species of Gram-negative bacteria species from the genus of Enterovibrio. It has been isolated from bleached and healthy corals in the water surrounding Magnetic Island, Australia.
