= Enterovibrio calviensis =

Scientific classification
- Domain: Bacteria
- Kingdom: Pseudomonadati
- Phylum: Pseudomonadota
- Class: Gammaproteobacteria
- Order: Vibrionales
- Family: Vibrionaceae
- Genus: Enterovibrio
- Species: E. calviensis

Binomial name
- Enterovibrio calviensis (Denner et al. 2002) Pascual et al. 2009

Type strain
- RE35/F12T

Synonyms
- Vibrio calviensis

Species of bacterium

Enterovibrio calviensis is a halophilic and facultatively oligotrophic bacterium species from the genus of Enterovibrio which has been isolated from sea water from the Bay of Calvi from the Mediterranean Sea in France.
