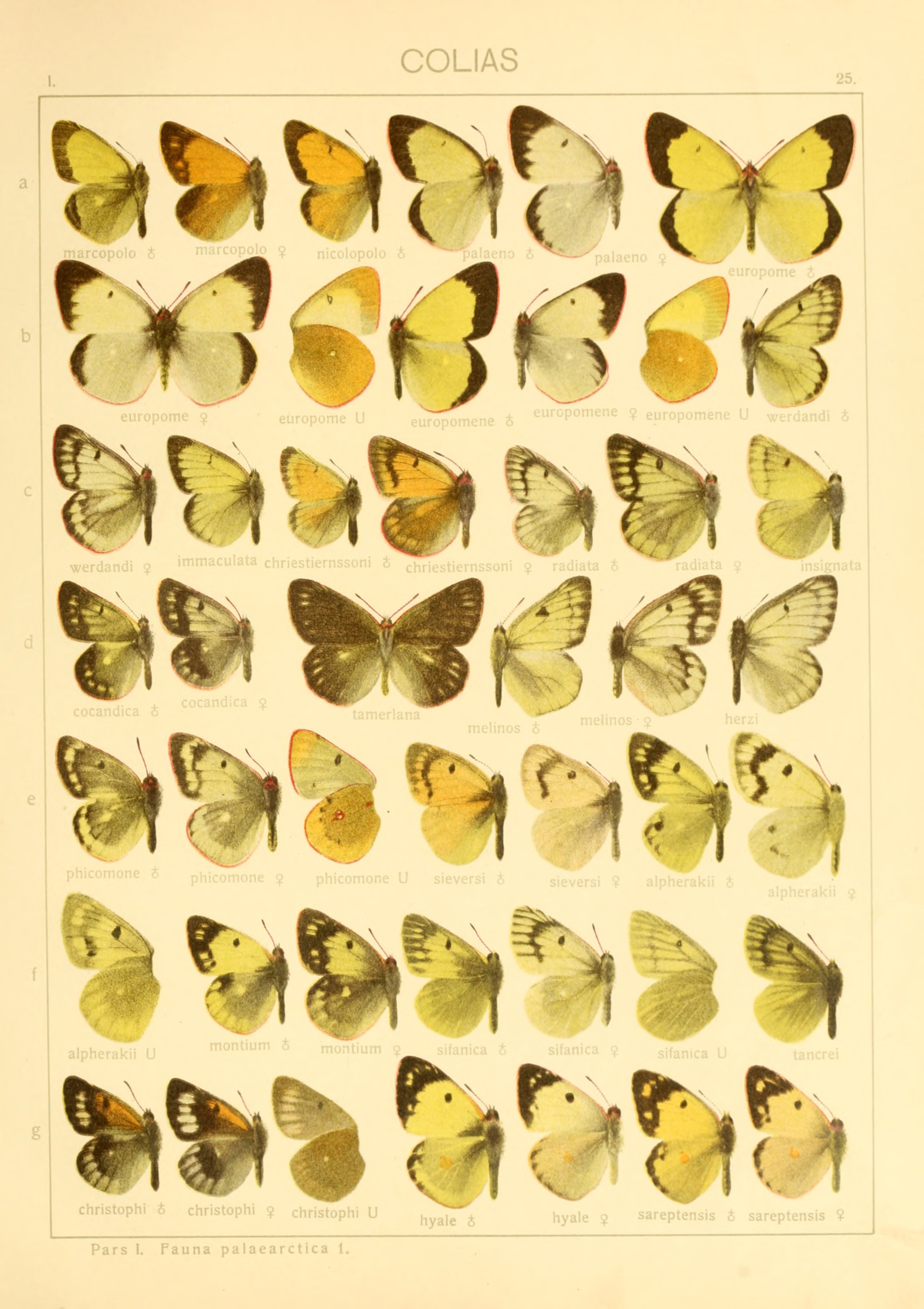
- Line d - 3rd image

Scientific classification
- Kingdom: Animalia
- Phylum: Arthropoda
- Clade: Pancrustacea
- Class: Insecta
- Order: Lepidoptera
- Family: Pieridae
- Genus: Colias
- Species: C. tamerlana

Binomial name
- Colias tamerlana Staudinger, 1897

Synonyms
- Colias mongola Alphéraky, 1897; Colias cocandica sidonia Weiss, 1968

= Colias tamerlana =

Species of butterfly

Colias tamerlana is a butterfly in the family Pieridae. It is found in the eastern Palearctic realm (western Siberia, northern China, and Mongolia).

== Description ==
It is a large and very dark member of the genus Colias.

== Biology ==
The larva feeds on Oxytropis oligantha

== Subspecies ==
- C. t. tamerlana Xinjiang, Kirgizia (eastern Issyk Kul)
- C. t. mongola Alphéraky, 1897 Altai, Sayan
- C. t. sidonia Weiss, 1968 northern Mongolia

== Taxonomy ==
It was accepted as a species by Josef Grieshuber & Gerardo Lamas but may be a subspecies of Colias nastes.
