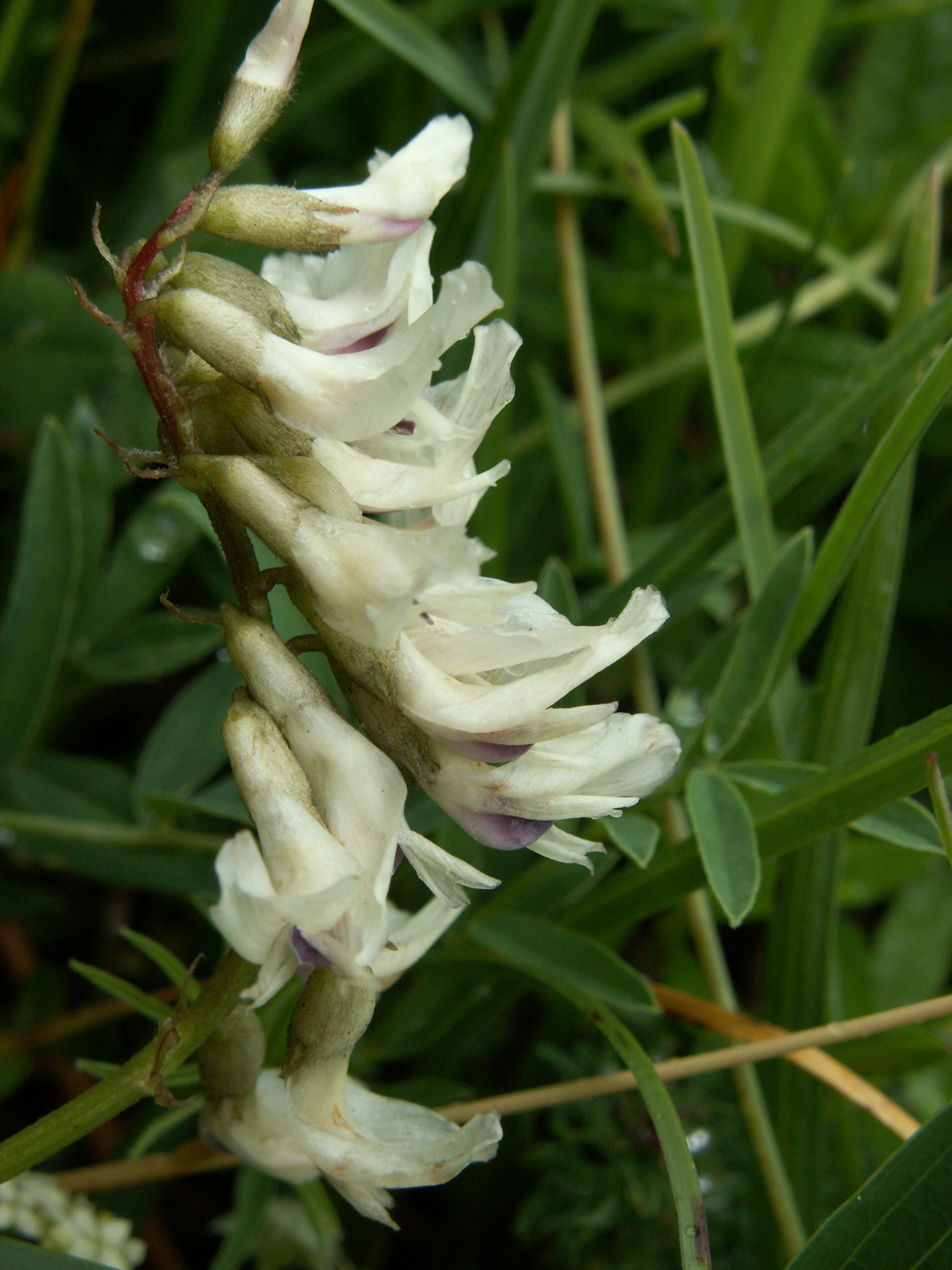

Conservation status
- Secure (NatureServe)

Scientific classification
- Kingdom: Plantae
- Clade: Tracheophytes
- Clade: Angiosperms
- Clade: Eudicots
- Clade: Rosids
- Order: Fabales
- Family: Fabaceae
- Subfamily: Faboideae
- Genus: Astragalus
- Species: A. australis

Binomial name
- Astragalus australis (L.) Lam.

Synonyms
- Astragalus aboriginum Astragalus forwoodii Astragalus linearis Astragalus richardsonii Astragalus scrupulicola

= Astragalus australis =

Indian milkvetch

Species of legume

Astragalus australis is a species of flowering plant in the legume family known by the common name Indian milkvetch. It is native to much of the Northern Hemisphere, including northern North America, Europe, and temperate Asia.

== Description ==
This plant produces spreading and erect stems up to 25 centimeters tall from a caudex. The stems have a dense coat of hairs and have leaves alternately arranged. Each leaf is up to 3 to 4 centimeters long and is made up of leaflets measuring a few millimeters in length. The leaflets are covered in ashy gray hairs. The inflorescence is a raceme of up to 15 flowers with petals that are greenish, white, purplish, or pinkish with green veins and purple tips. The fruit is a hairless legume pod that matures deep red in color and measures up to 2.6 centimeters in length. It contains up to 12 seeds.

== Ecology ==
This plant grows as far north as Banks Island in the Canadian Arctic Archipelago. It grows at the seaside, often on gravelly ridges.

This plant was used for food by the Cree and Stone peoples of North America.

Varieties of this plant include the rare var. olympicus, Cotton's milkvetch, which is endemic to the Olympic Mountains of Washington in the United States. It grows on subalpine mountain ridges with sparse vegetation.
