= Veronia pacifica =

Scientific classification
- Domain: Bacteria
- Kingdom: Pseudomonadati
- Phylum: Pseudomonadota
- Class: Gammaproteobacteria
- Order: Vibrionales
- Family: Vibrionaceae
- Genus: Veronia
- Species: V. pacifica

Binomial name
- Veronia pacifica (Liu et al. 2016) Gomez-Gil et al. 2022

Synonyms
- Enterovibrio pacificus Liu et al. 2016

Species of bacterium

Veronia pacifica is a species of Gram-negative, facultatively anaerobic, motile bacterium in the family Vibrionaceae. It was isolated from surface seawater of the South Pacific Gyre. The specific epithet pacifica refers to the Pacific Ocean. The type strain is SW014^{T} (= CAIM 1920^{T} = DSM 25033^{T} = KCTC 42425^{T} = MCCC 1K00500^{T}).

The species was originally described as Enterovibrio pacificus. Phylogenomic analyses subsequently supported its transfer to the newly established genus Veronia as Veronia pacifica, which is the type species of the genus.

V. pacifica has an optimum growth temperature of 28 °C. NaCl is required for growth, with an optimum salinity of 3-4%.
