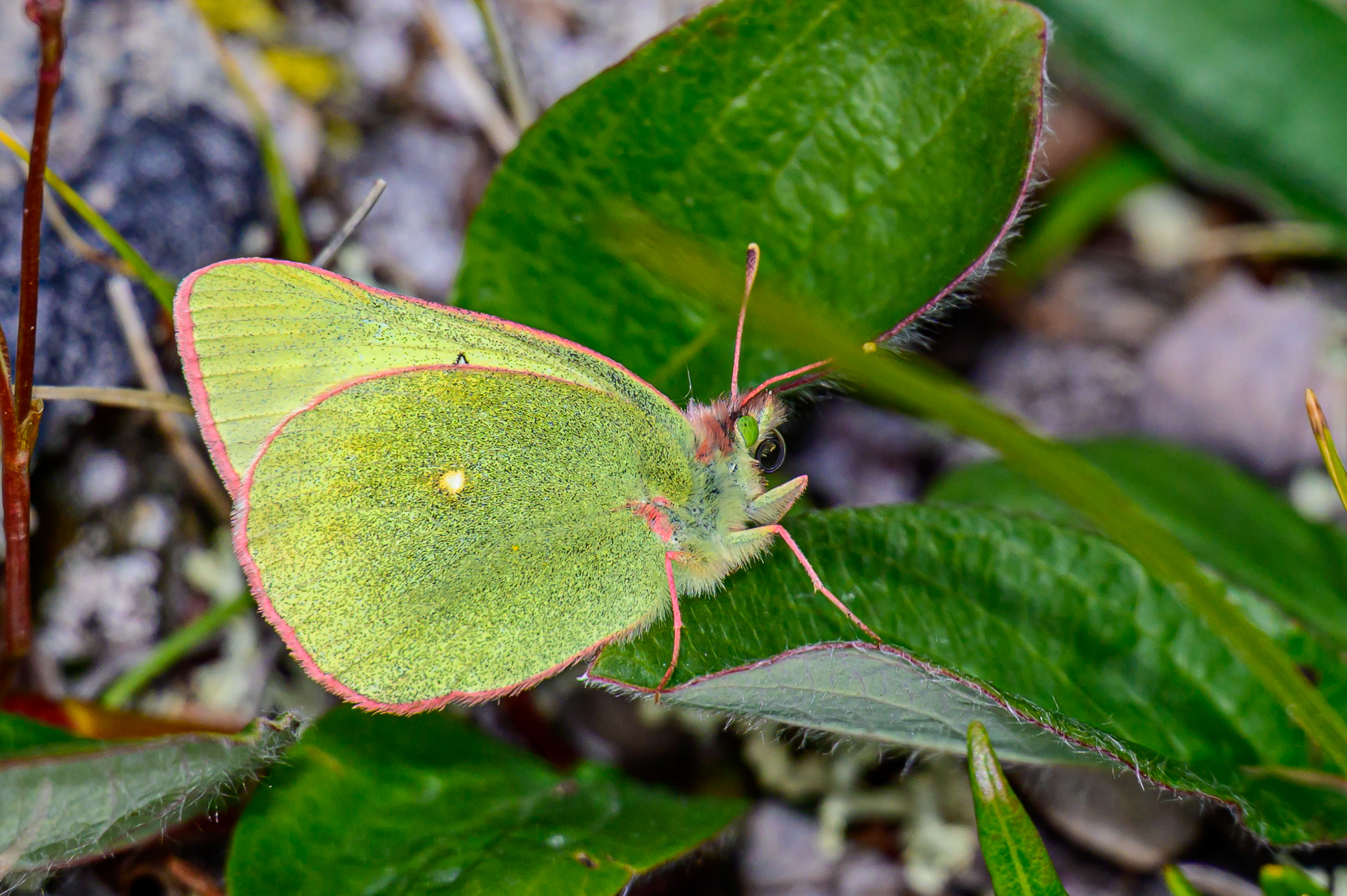

Scientific classification
- Kingdom: Animalia
- Phylum: Arthropoda
- Class: Insecta
- Order: Lepidoptera
- Family: Pieridae
- Genus: Colias
- Species: C. canadensis

Binomial name
- Colias canadensis Ferris, 1982

= Colias canadensis =

Canada sulphur

Species of butterfly

Colias canadensis, the Canada sulphur, is a butterfly in the family Pieridae found in North America. It has only been found from Alaska and Northwest Territories, to northern British Columbia and Alberta.

Flight period is early May to early August. Its habitats include open taiga forests, wet tundra, mountain valleys, and alpine tundra near tree lines.

Wingspan is from 32 to 47 mm.
