= Colias viluiensis =

Scientific classification
- Kingdom: Animalia
- Phylum: Arthropoda
- Clade: Pancrustacea
- Class: Insecta
- Order: Lepidoptera
- Family: Pieridae
- Genus: Colias
- Species: C. viluiensis

Binomial name
- Colias viluiensis Ménétries, 1859

Species of butterfly

Colias viluiensis, is a butterfly in the family Pieridae. It is found in Transbaikalia.

== Description ==
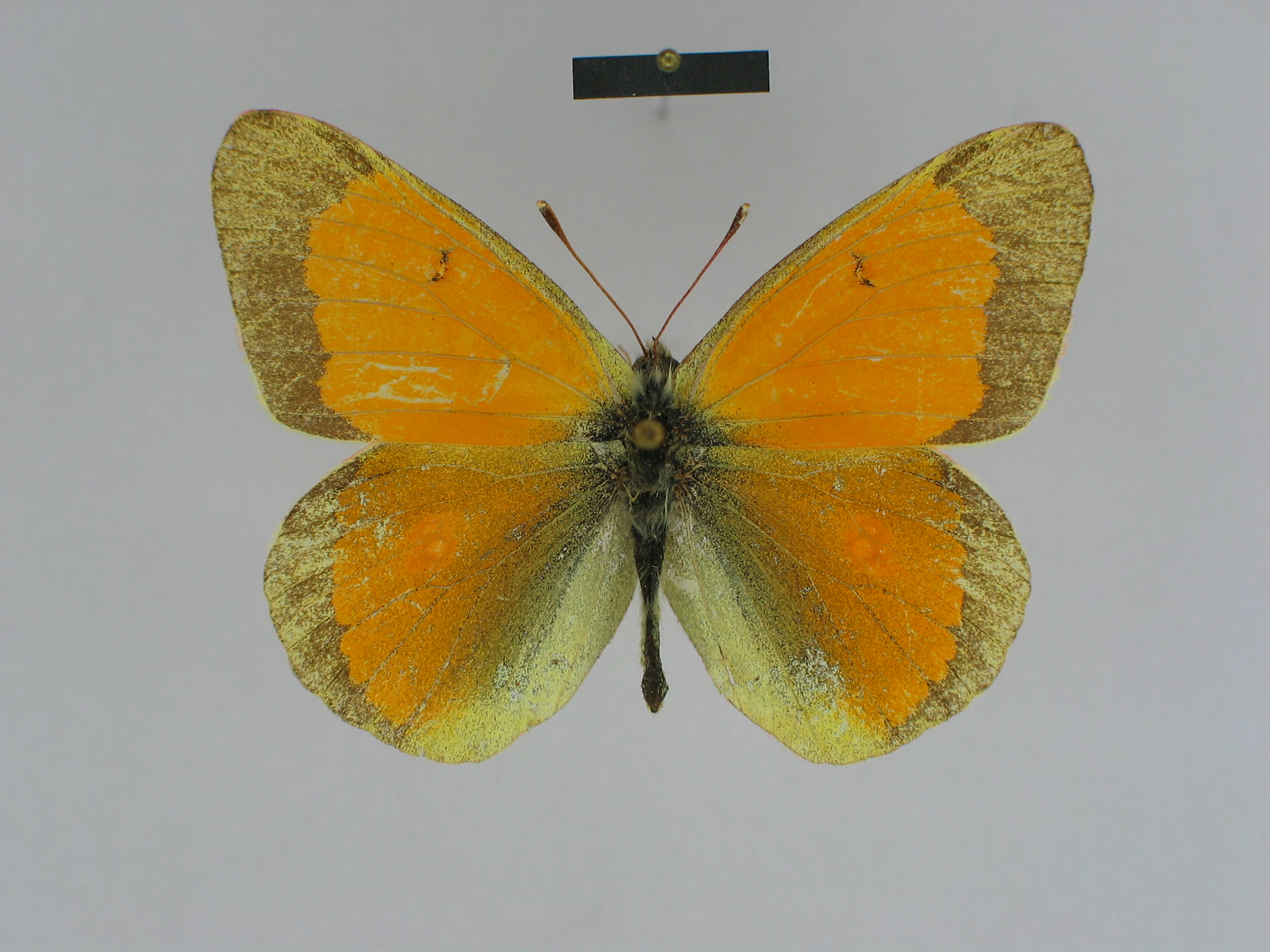
Dorsal side of a male Colias viluiensis.

Pale orange-yellow, with rather narrow distal margin, light-centred middle spot on the forewing and very large, reddish-brown-edged middle spot on the hindwing. Underside pale yellow; hindwing dusted with greenish, the distal margins being pale blackish, the middle spot of the forewing having a light-coloured centre and the large white middle spot of the hindwing being double and edged with black; female red or white, hindwing sometimes almost black.

== Subspecies ==
- C. v. viluiensis
- C. v. dahurica Austaut, 1899
- C. v. heliophora Churkin & Grieshuber, 2001 Chukotka

== Taxonomy ==
Treated as a subspecies of Colias hecla by Josef Grieshuber & Gerardo Lamas, who point out that the spelling viluensis was used by Ménétriés in his earliest published description.
