= Enterovibrio norvegicus =

Scientific classification
- Domain: Bacteria
- Kingdom: Pseudomonadati
- Phylum: Pseudomonadota
- Class: Gammaproteobacteria
- Order: Vibrionales
- Family: Vibrionaceae
- Genus: Enterovibrio
- Species: E. norvegicus

Binomial name
- Enterovibrio norvegicus Thompson et al. 2002

Type strain
- LMG 19839

Species of bacterium

Enterovibrio norvegicus is a bacterium species from the genus of Enterovibrio which has been isolated from the gut of the larvae of a flatfish (Scophthalmus maximus) in Norway.
