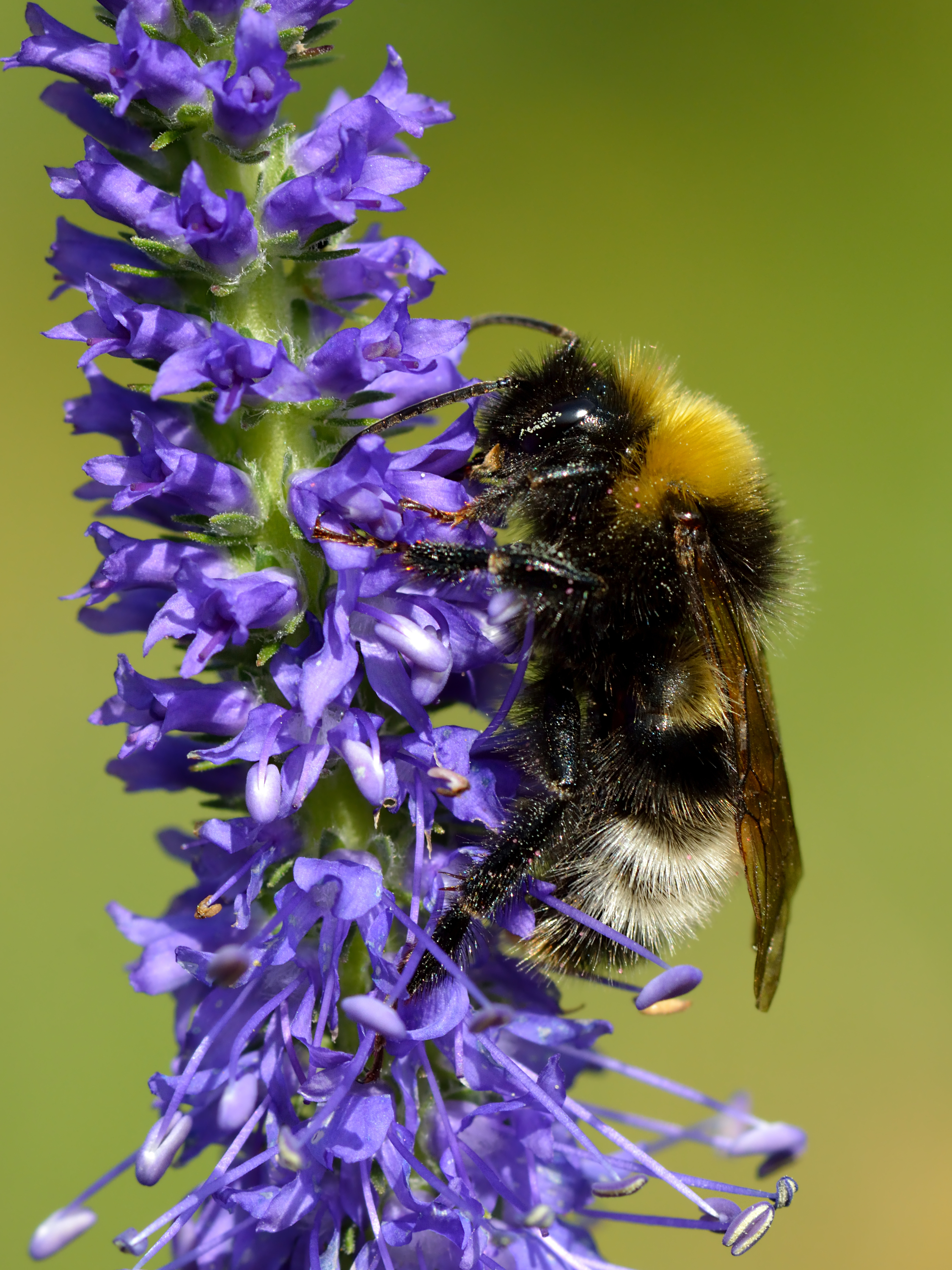

Scientific classification
- Domain: Eukaryota
- Kingdom: Animalia
- Phylum: Arthropoda
- Class: Insecta
- Order: Hymenoptera
- Family: Apidae
- Genus: Bombus
- Subgenus: Psithyrus
- Species: B. norvegicus

Binomial name
- Bombus norvegicus Sparre-Schneider, 1918

= Bombus norvegicus =

Species of bee

Bombus norvegicus is a species of cuckoo bumblebee.
