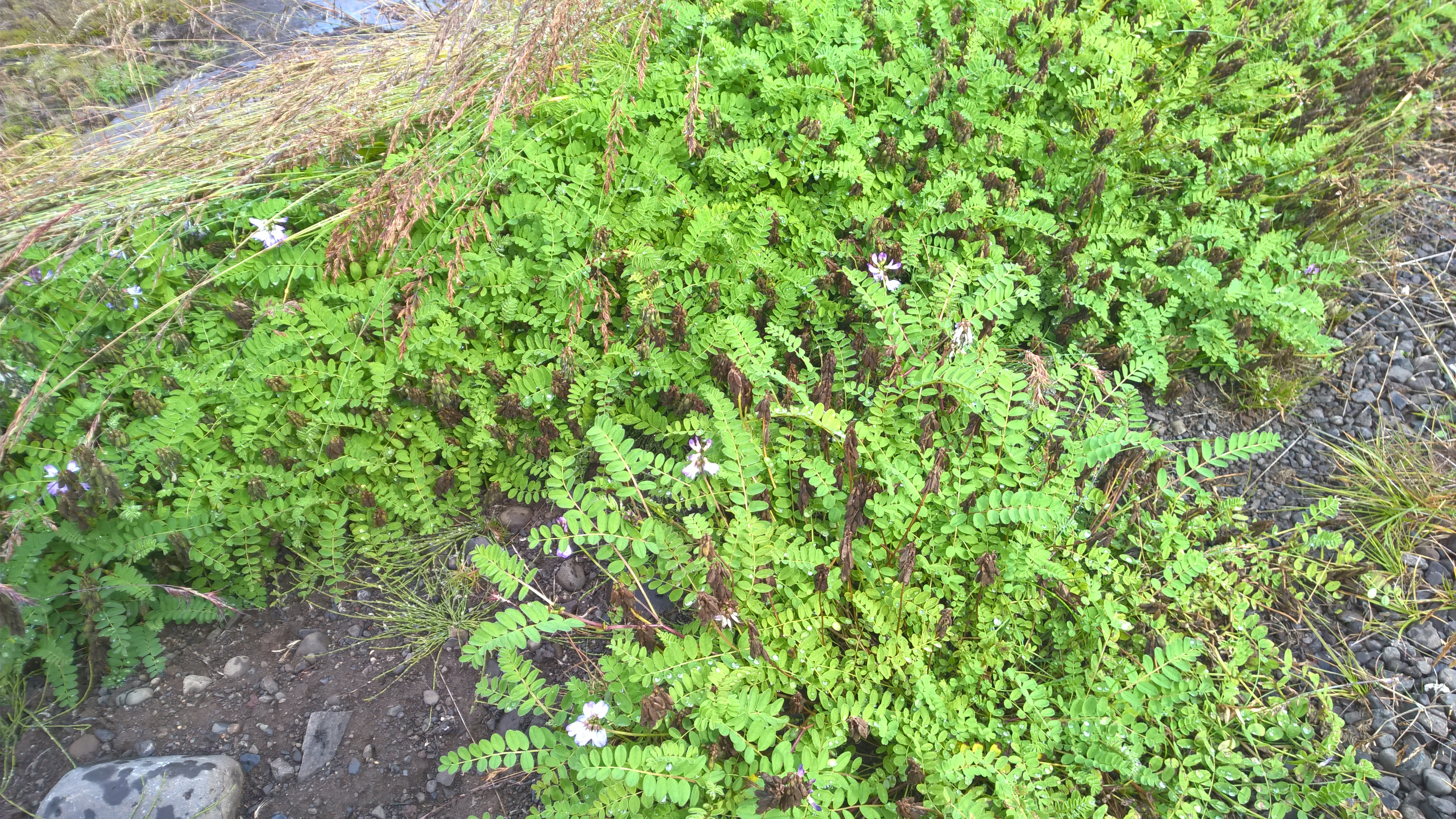

Scientific classification
- Kingdom: Plantae
- Clade: Tracheophytes
- Clade: Angiosperms
- Clade: Eudicots
- Clade: Rosids
- Order: Fabales
- Family: Fabaceae
- Subfamily: Faboideae
- Genus: Astragalus
- Species: A. norvegicus

Binomial name
- Astragalus norvegicus Weber

= Astragalus norvegicus =

Species of legume

Astragalus norvegicus is a species of flowering plant belonging to the family Fabaceae.

Its native range extends from Northern and Eastern Central Europe to the Russian Far East and Mongolia.

Synonym:

- Astragalus subpolaris Boriss. & Schischk.
