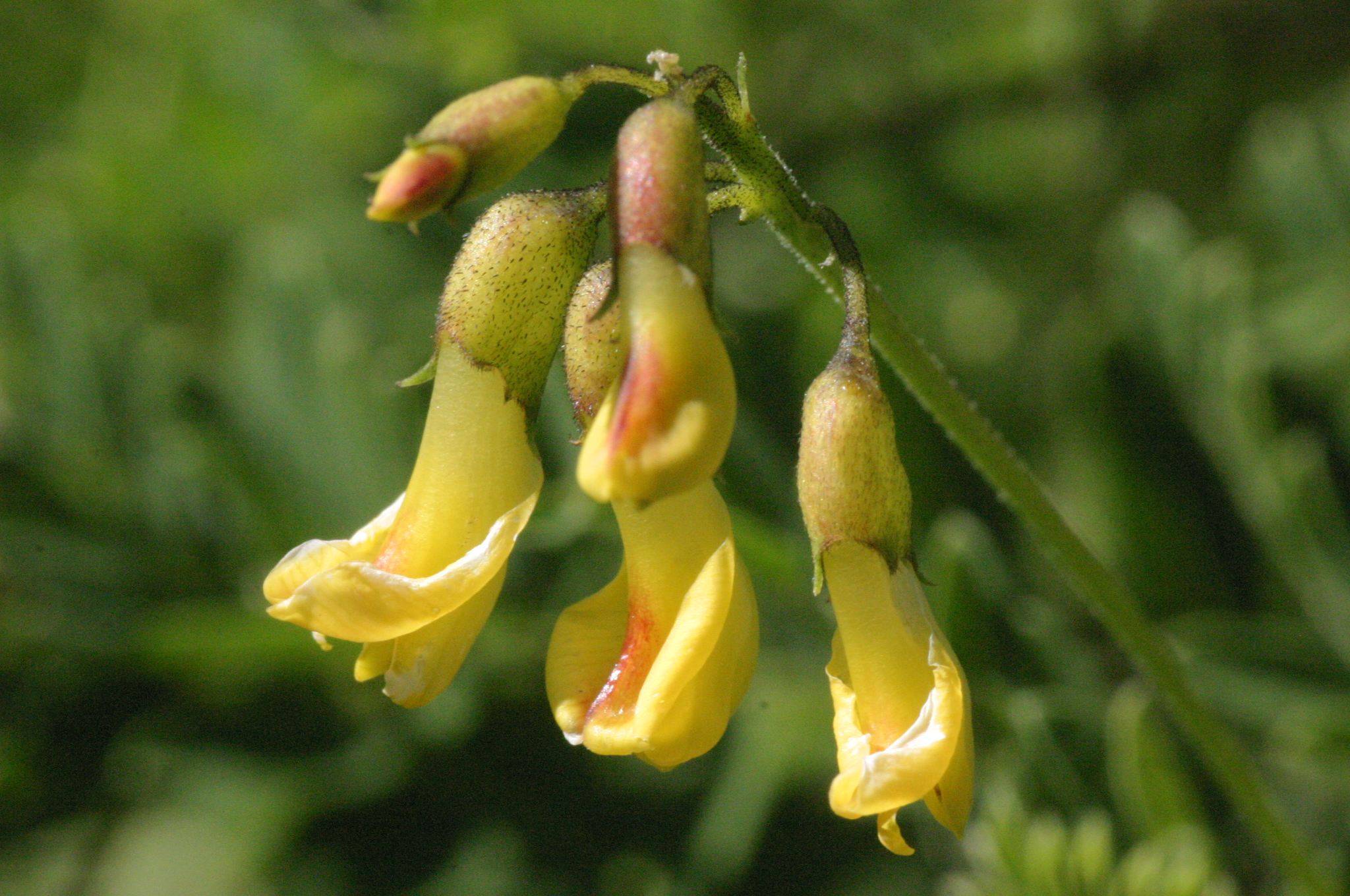
- Close-up of flowers
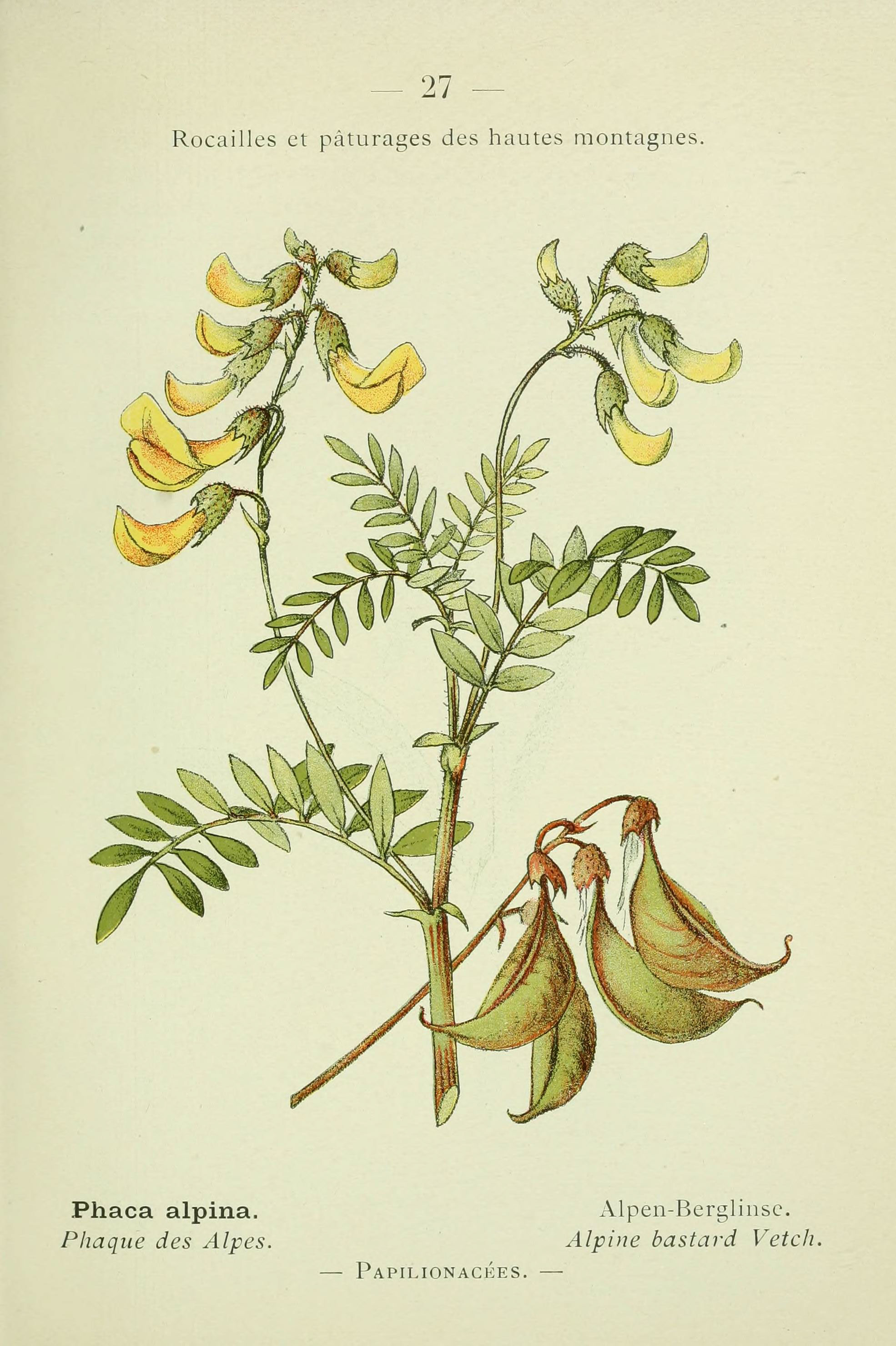
- Botanical illustration

Scientific classification
- Kingdom: Plantae
- Clade: Embryophytes
- Clade: Tracheophytes
- Clade: Spermatophytes
- Clade: Angiosperms
- Clade: Eudicots
- Clade: Rosids
- Order: Fabales
- Family: Fabaceae
- Subfamily: Faboideae
- Genus: Astragalus
- Species: A. penduliflorus

Binomial name
- Astragalus penduliflorus Lam.

Synonyms
- Astragalus alpinus (L.) E.H.L.Krause; Astragalus penduliflorus f. microcarpus Bolzon; Astragalus ramosissimus Scop.; Colutea alpina Lam.; Colutea arborescens var. alpestris Bolzon; Phaca alpina L.; Tragacantha penduliflora (Lam.) Kuntze

= Astragalus penduliflorus =

Species of plant

Astragalus penduliflorus, the mountain lentil, is a species of flowering plant in the family Fabaceae. It is native to the high mountains of Europe. A perennial shrub reaching 80 cm (31 in), it is a member of section Cenantrum.

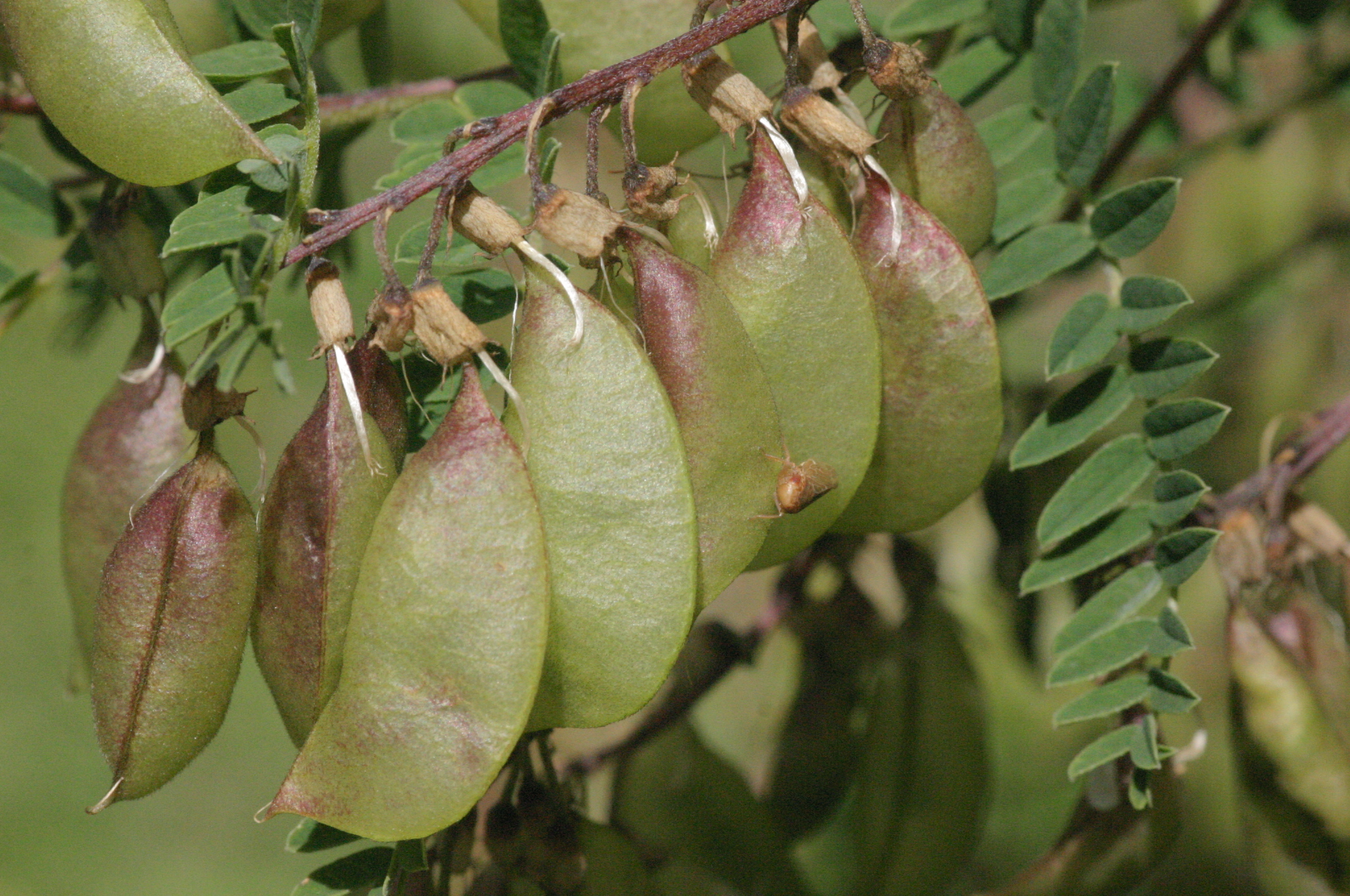
Pods
