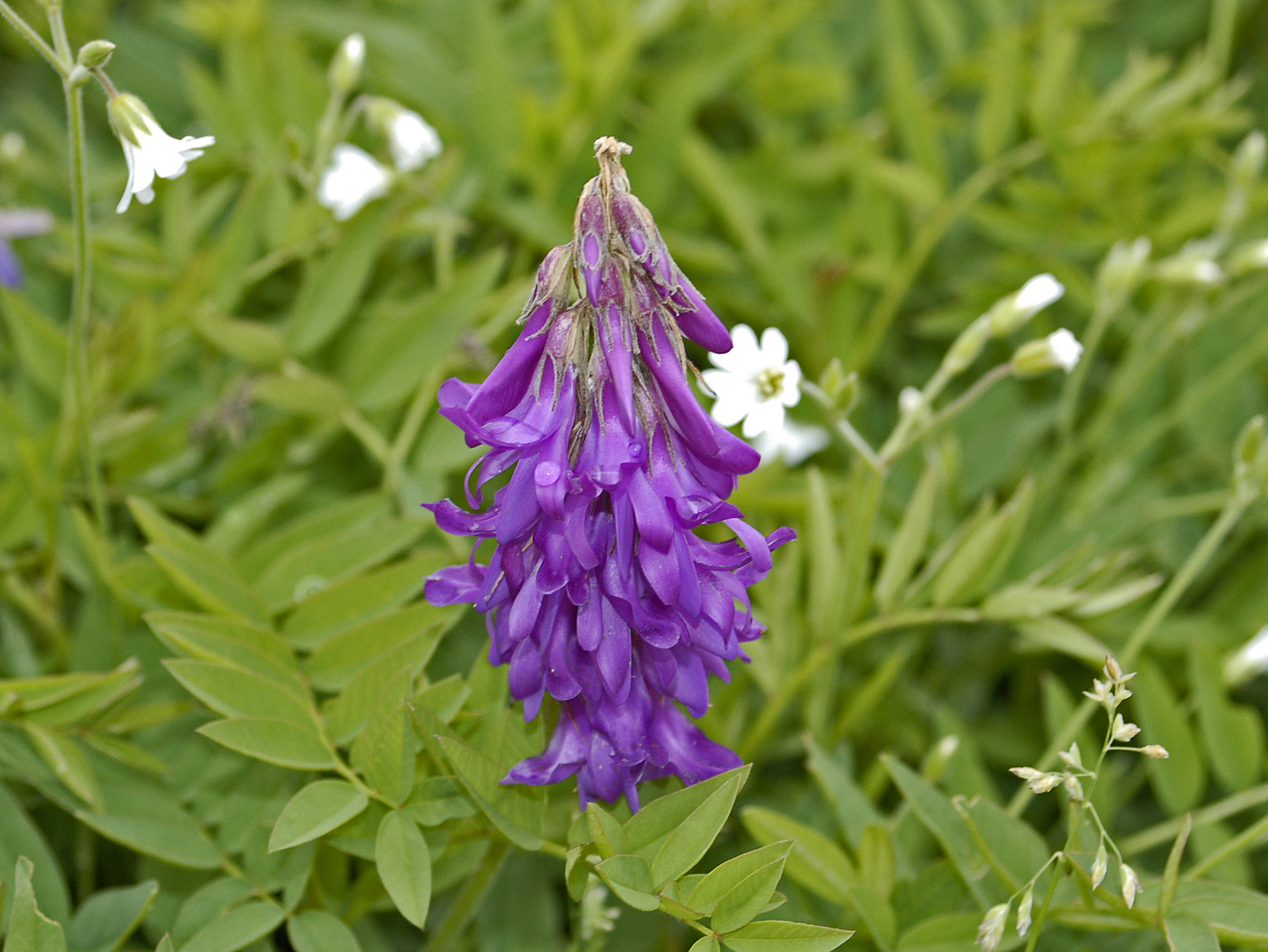
- Flowers of Hedysarum hedysaroides subsp. hedysaroides at the Giardino Botanico Alpino Chanousia

Scientific classification
- Kingdom: Plantae
- Clade: Tracheophytes
- Clade: Angiosperms
- Clade: Eudicots
- Clade: Rosids
- Order: Fabales
- Family: Fabaceae
- Subfamily: Faboideae
- Genus: Hedysarum
- Species: H. hedysaroides

Binomial name
- Hedysarum hedysaroides (L.) Schinz & Thell.

Synonyms
- Astragalus hedysaroides L.; Hedysarum obscurum L.

= Hedysarum hedysaroides =

Species of legume

Hedysarum hedysaroides, common name alpine sainfoin, is a perennial herb belonging to the family Fabaceae.

== Description ==
Hedysarum hedysaroides grows to 20–60 centimetres (7.9–23.6 in) in height. It is a perennial plant, with straight or ascending stems and imparipinnate leaves, 1–3 cm long. Inflorescences bear from 15 to 30-35 purple-violet flowers in clusters. The flowering period extends from June to August.

== Distribution ==
This species can be found in Central and Southern Europe, in Finland, Russia, Ukraine and Western North America. It occurs in alpine meadows at an elevation of 1,600–2,500 metres (5,200–8,200 ft) above sea level.

== Bibliography ==
- Pignatti S. - Flora d'Italia (3 voll.) - Edagricole - 1982
- Tutin, T.G. et al. - Flora Europaea, second edition - 1993
- Zangheri P. - Flora Italica (2 voll.) - Cedam - 1976
