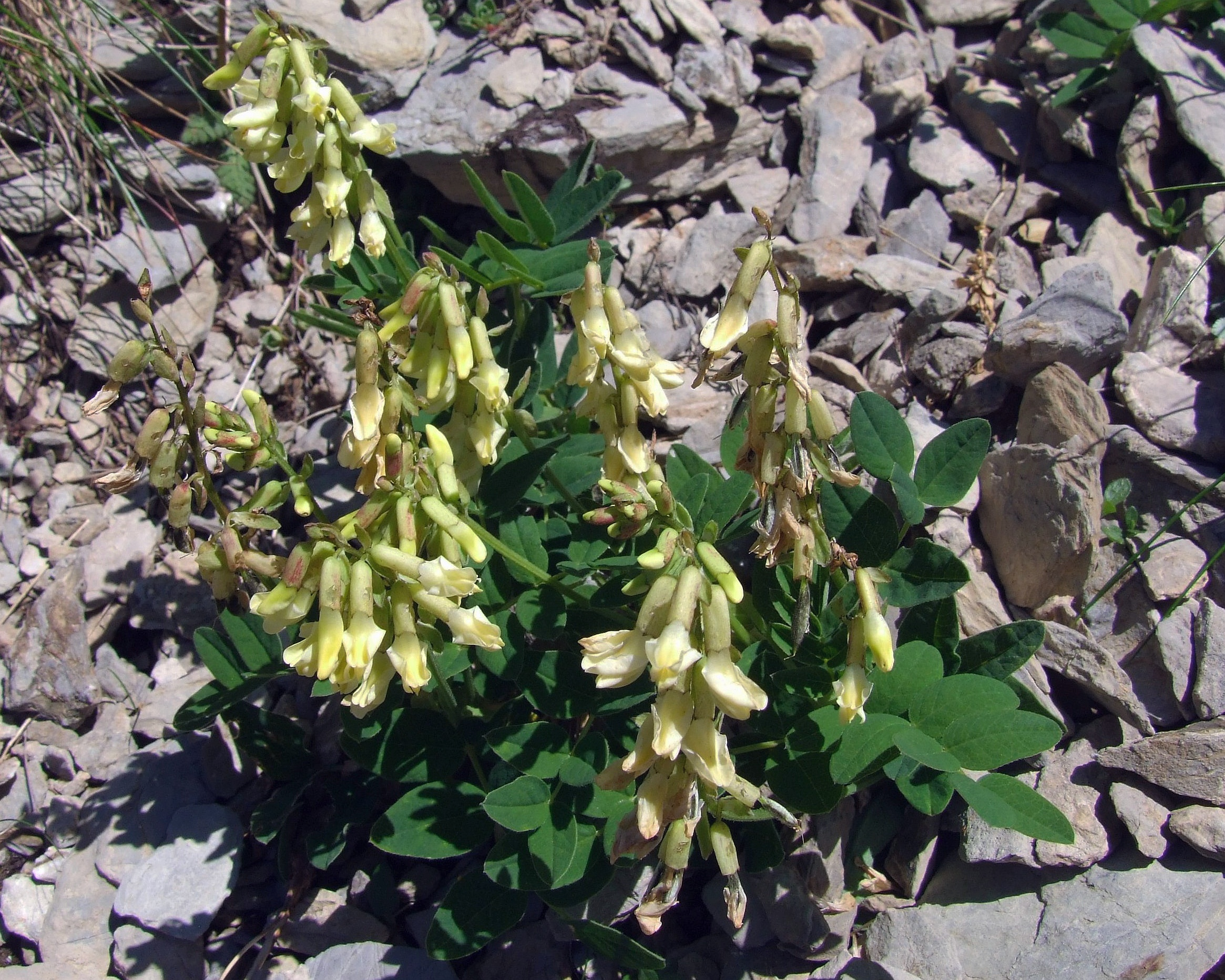
- Habit
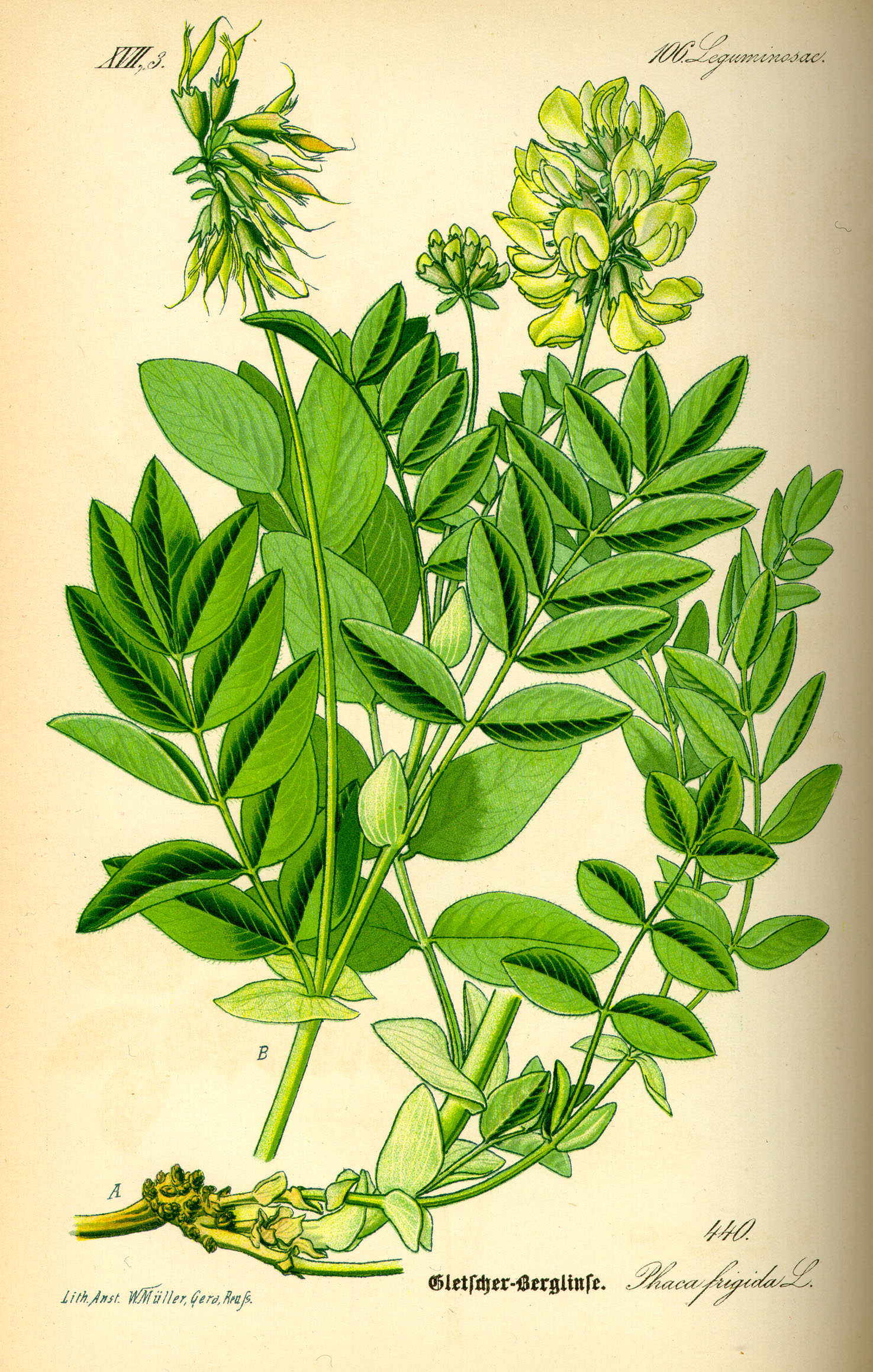
- Botanical illustration

Scientific classification
- Kingdom: Plantae
- Clade: Embryophytes
- Clade: Tracheophytes
- Clade: Spermatophytes
- Clade: Angiosperms
- Clade: Eudicots
- Clade: Rosids
- Order: Fabales
- Family: Fabaceae
- Subfamily: Faboideae
- Genus: Astragalus
- Species: A. frigidus

Binomial name
- Astragalus frigidus (L.) A.Gray

Synonyms
- List: Astragaloides frigida (L.) Medik.; Astragalus exaltatus (Ledeb.) Bunge; Astragalus exaltatus f. glaber Litv.; Astragalus frigidus var. grigorjewii (B.Fedtsch.) Jurtzev; Astragalus frigidus subsp. grigorjewii (B.Fedtsch.) Chater; Astragalus frigidus subsp. minutulus Kuvaev; Astragalus frigidus subsp. parviflorus (Ledeb.) Hultén; Astragalus frigidus subsp. secundus (DC.) Vorosch.; Astragalus grigorjewii B.Fedtsch.; Astragalus kolaensis Kuzen.; Astragalus pubescens Schrank; Astragalus secundus DC.; Colutea frigida (L.) Poir.; Phaca alpina O.F.Müll.; Phaca exaltata Fisch. ex Sweet; Phaca frigida L.; Phaca frigida var. brevipes Ledeb.; Phaca frigida var. exaltata Ledeb.; Phaca frigida var. parviflora Ledeb.; Phaca ochreata Crantz; Phaca parviflora Turcz.; Phaca umbellata Nyman; Tragacantha frigida (L.) Kuntze; Tragacantha secunda (DC.) Kuntze

= Astragalus frigidus =

Species of plant

Astragalus frigidus, the yellow alpine milkvetch or pallid milkvetch, is a species of flowering plant in the family Fabaceae. It is native to subarctic and subalpine Eurasia. A perennial shrub 8 to 35 cm (3 to 14 in) tall, it is typically found in forests, meadows, and along riverbanks at elevations from 200 to 3,000 m (700 to 9,800 ft).

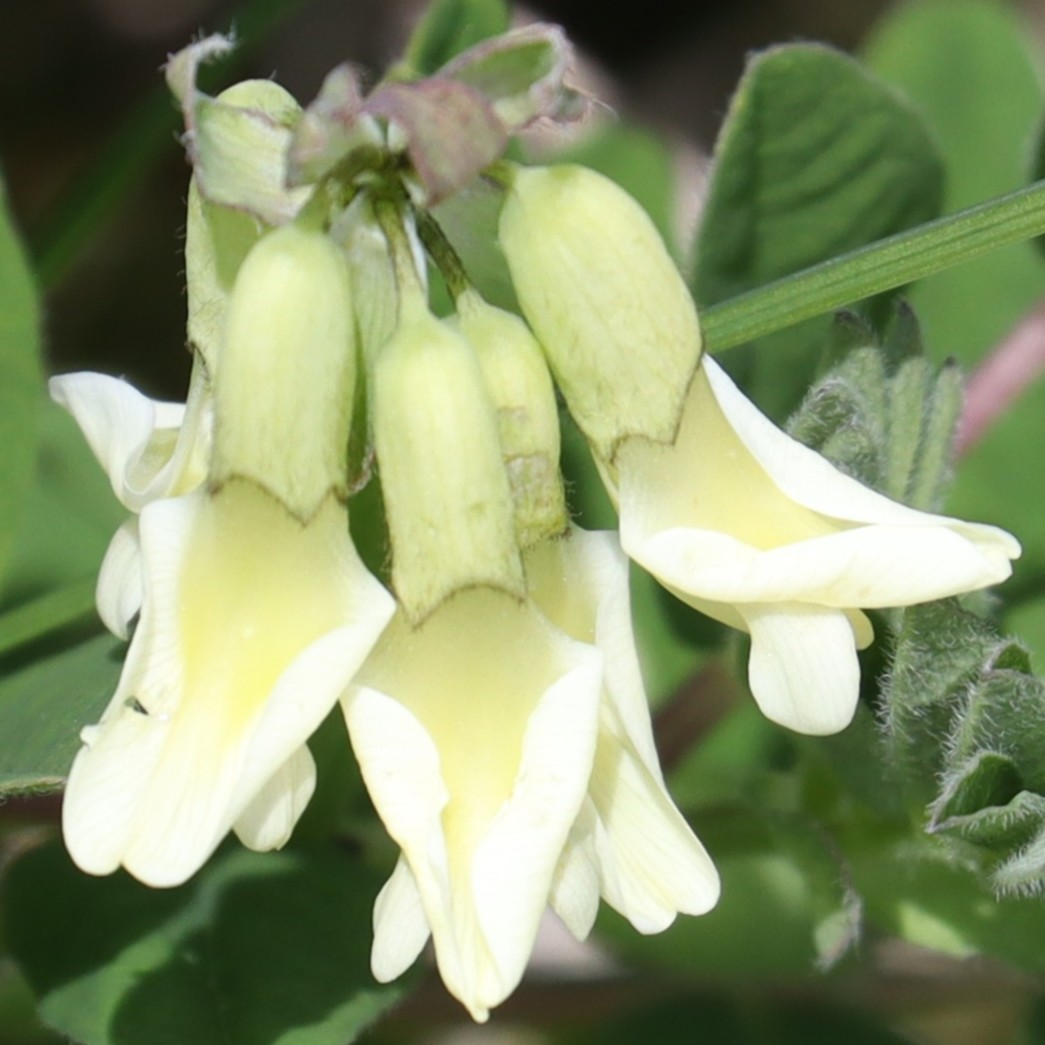
Close-up of flowers

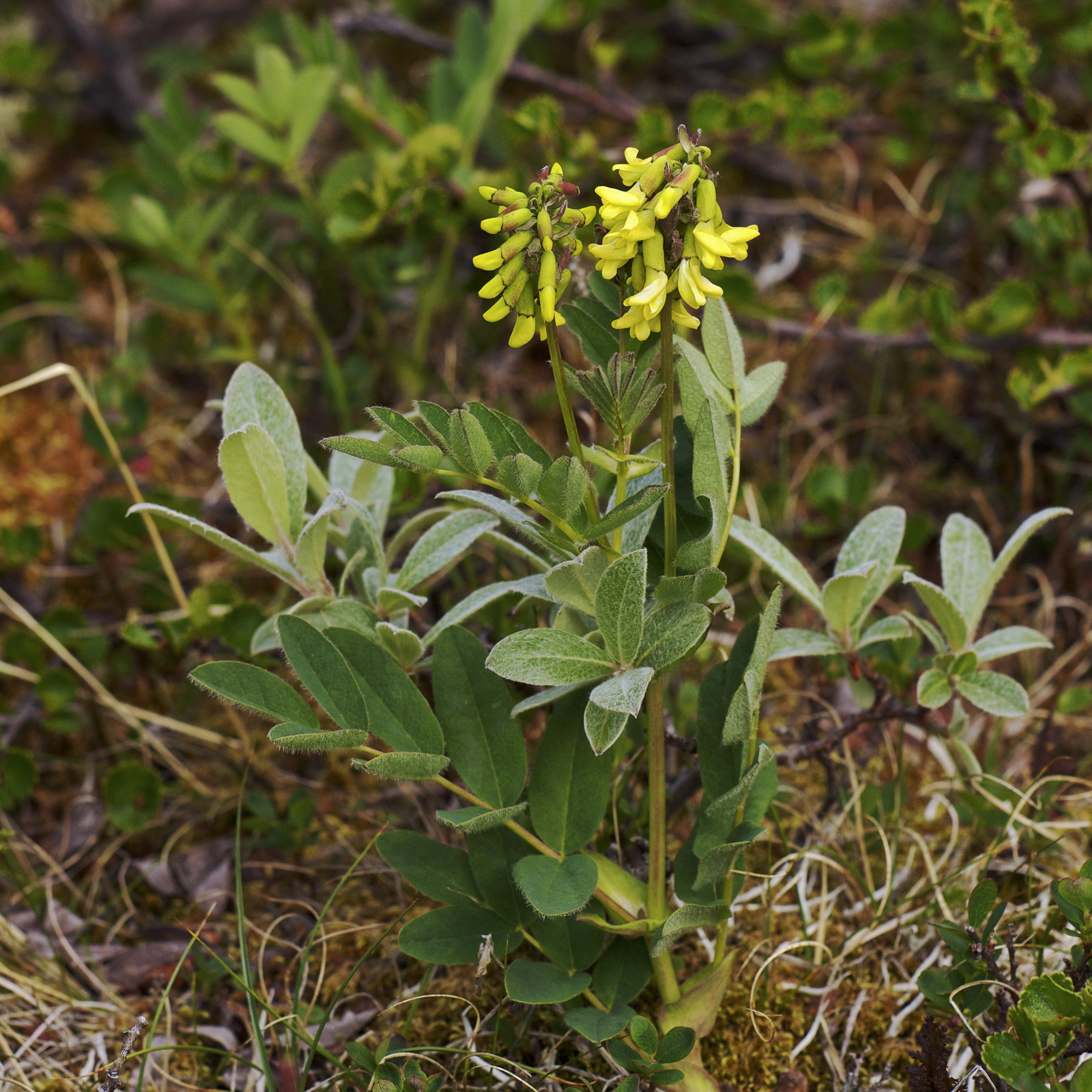
An individual with yellower flowers than typical
