= Aporia japfuensis =

- Male upperside
- Male underside

Scientific classification
- Kingdom: Animalia
- Phylum: Arthropoda
- Clade: Pancrustacea
- Class: Insecta
- Order: Lepidoptera
- Family: Pieridae
- Genus: Aporia
- Species: A. japfuensis

Binomial name
- Aporia japfuensis Yoshino, 2015

Species of butterfly

Aporia japfuensis, also known as the Naga blackvein, is a butterfly in the family Pieridae. It is found in Nagaland, Arunachal Pradesh and Meghalaya in India. It was described by Kazuyoshi Yoshino in 2015. This species is monotypic.

== Etymology ==
This species was named after the type locality (Mount Japfü, Nagaland).

Female upperside

== Description ==
Female underside

This species is similar to Aporia bifurcata but differs from it by having the white patch in the cell of the upperside forewing and upperside and underside hindwings being narrower and shorter than bifurcata.
