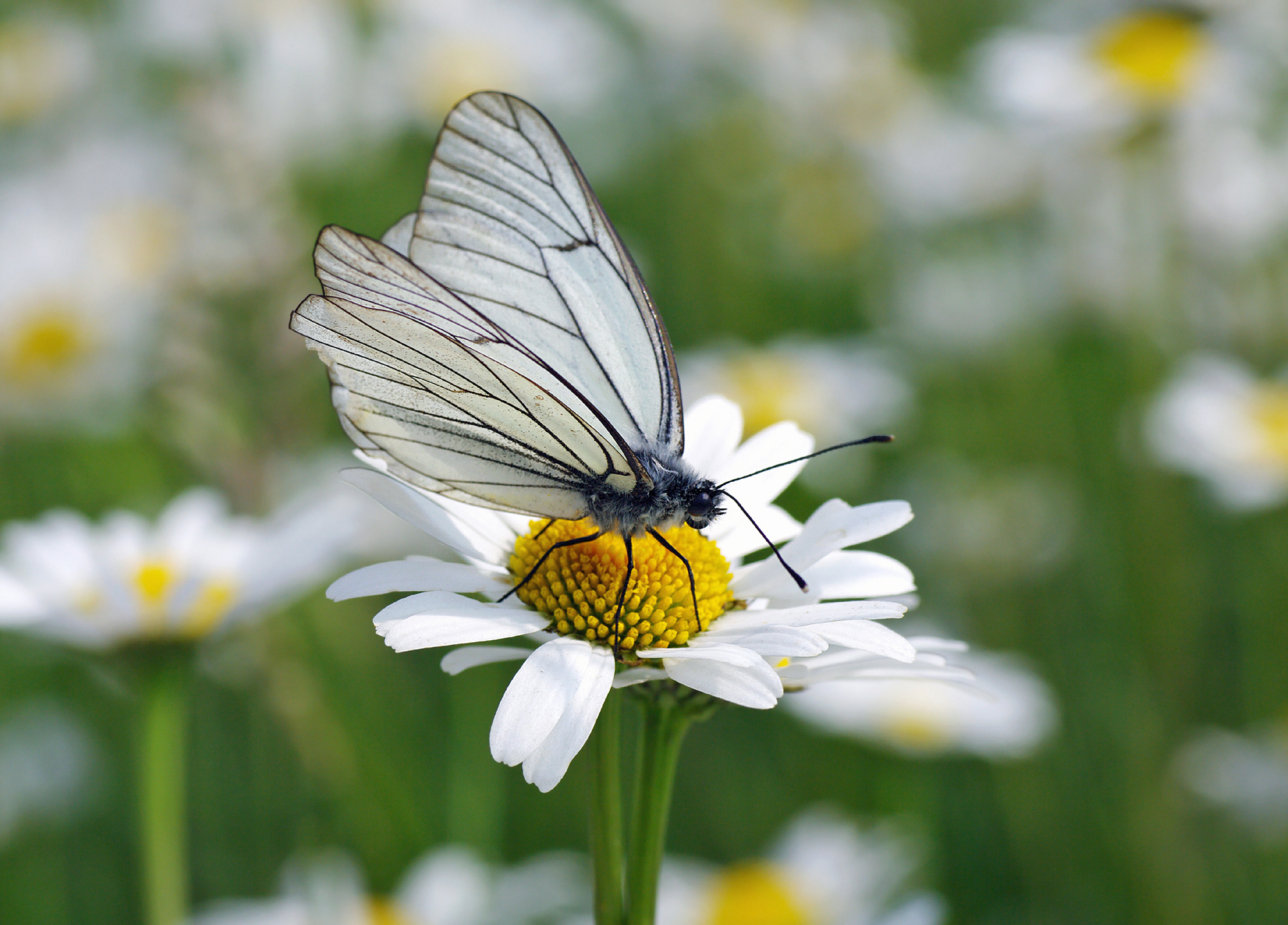

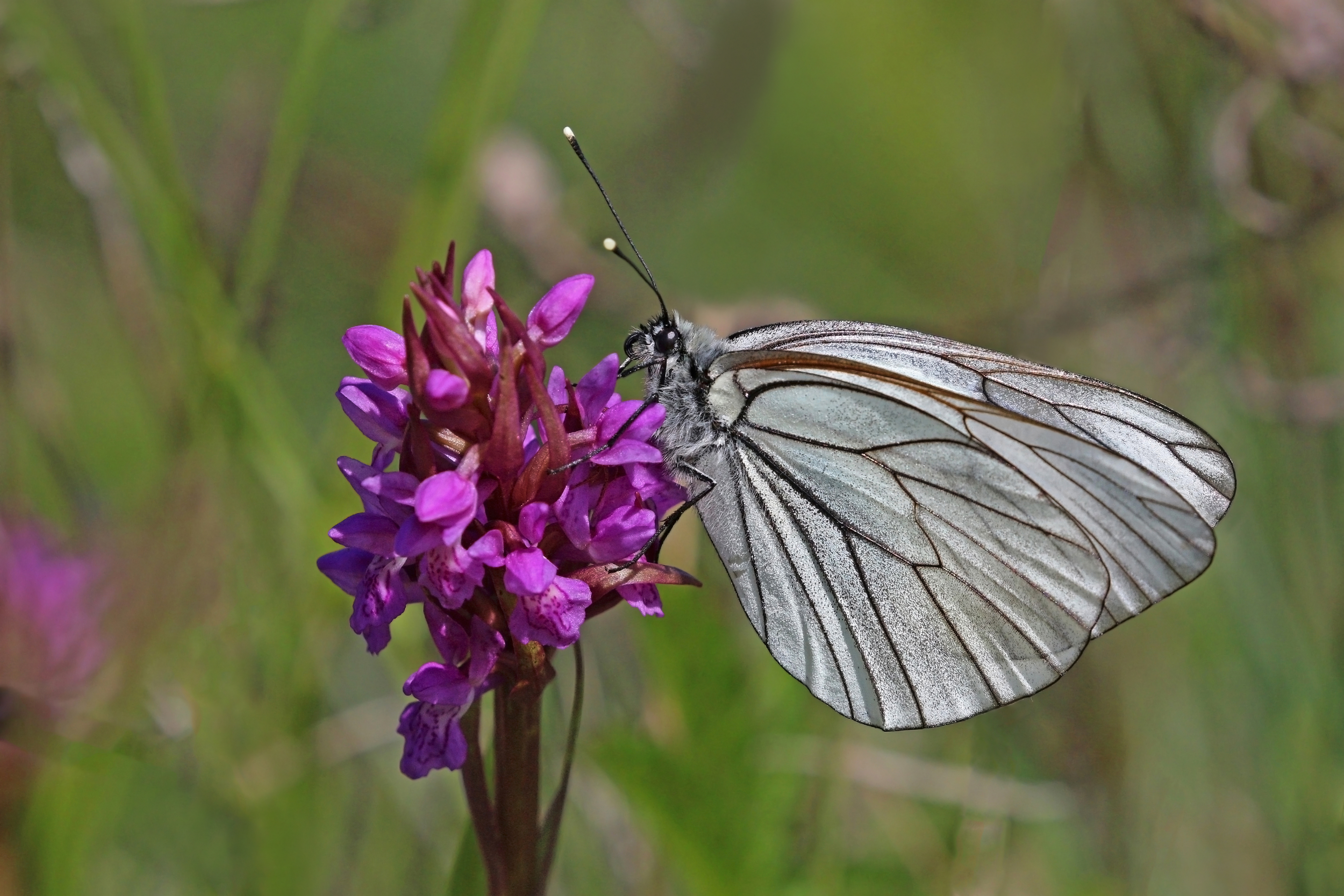
- Male

Conservation status
- Least Concern (IUCN 3.1)

Scientific classification
- Kingdom: Animalia
- Phylum: Arthropoda
- Clade: Pancrustacea
- Class: Insecta
- Order: Lepidoptera
- Family: Pieridae
- Genus: Aporia
- Species: A. crataegi

Binomial name
- Aporia crataegi (Linnaeus, 1758)

= Aporia crataegi =

Black-veined white

Species of butterfly

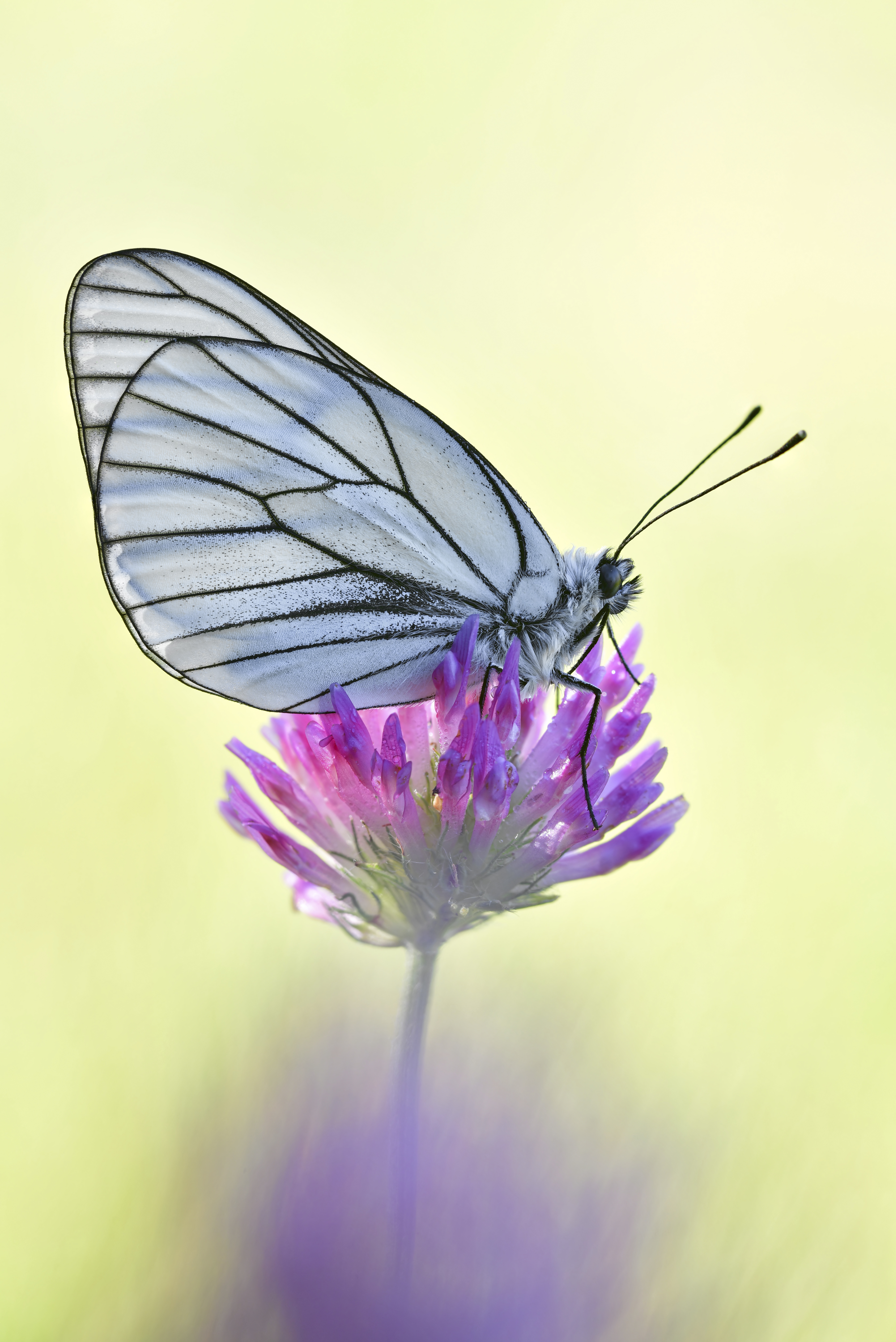
Black-veined white on the red clover

Aporia crataegi, the black-veined white, is a large butterfly of the family Pieridae. A. crataegi is widespread and common. Its range extends from northwest Africa in the west to Transcaucasia and across the Palearctic to Siberia and Japan in the east. In the south, it is found in Turkey, Cyprus, Israel, Lebanon and Syria. It is not usually present in the British Isles or northern Scandinavia.

== Subspecies ==
Subspecies include:

- Aporia crataegi adherbal (Fruhstorfer, 1910) Japan
- Aporia crataegi augusta (Turati, 1905) Sicily
- Aporia crataegi augustior (Graves, 1925) Jordan, Israel
- Aporia crataegi banghaasi (Bryk, 1921)
- Aporia crataegi basania (Fruhstorfer, 1910) Alps
- Aporia crataegi colona (Krulikowsky, 1909) Russia
- Aporia crataegi crataegi (Linnaeus, 1758) Scandinavia
- Aporia crataegi fert (Turati & Fiori, 1930) Greece
- Aporia crataegi hyalina (Röber, 1907) Asia Minor
- Aporia crataegi iranica (Forster, 1939) Armenia, Iran, Azerbaijan
- Aporia crataegi karavaievi (Krulikowsky, 1926) Russia, Ukraine, Balkans
- Aporia crataegi mauretanica (Obethür, 1909) Northern Africa
- Aporia crataegi meinhardi (Krulikowsky, 1909) Siberia, Kamchatka Peninsula
- Aporia crataegi pellucida (Ruber, 1907) Kopet-Dagh
- Aporia crataegi rotunda (Eitschberger, 1971) Italy
- Aporia crataegi rutae (Bryk, 1940) Spain
- Aporia crataegi sachalinensis (Matsumura, 1925) Sakhalin
- Aporia crataegi shugnana (Sheljuzhko, 1925) Pamir
- Aporia crataegi tianschanica (Rühl, 1893)
- Aporia crataegi transitoria (Lempke, 1974) Central Europe
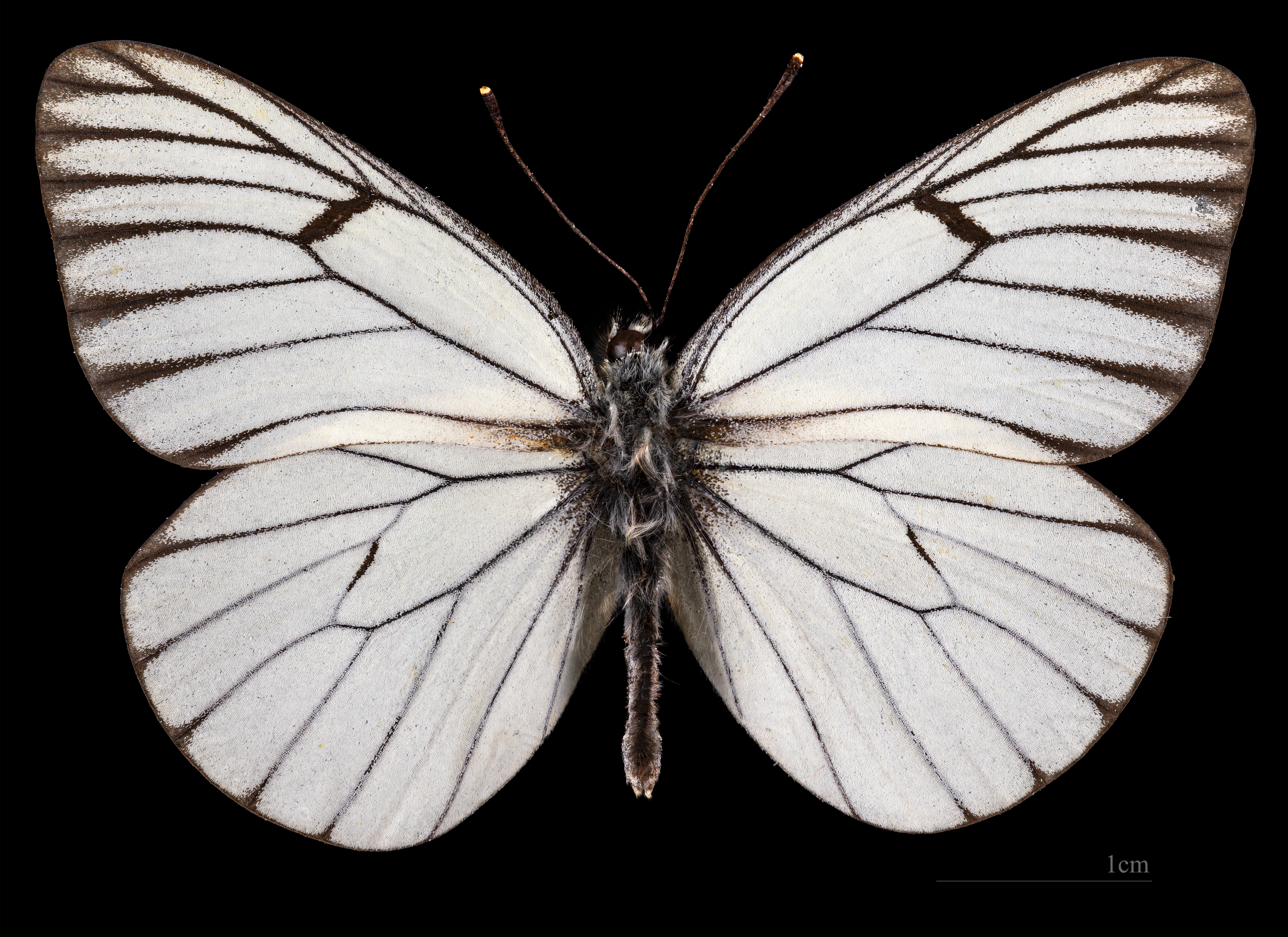
Aporia crataegi augusta ♂

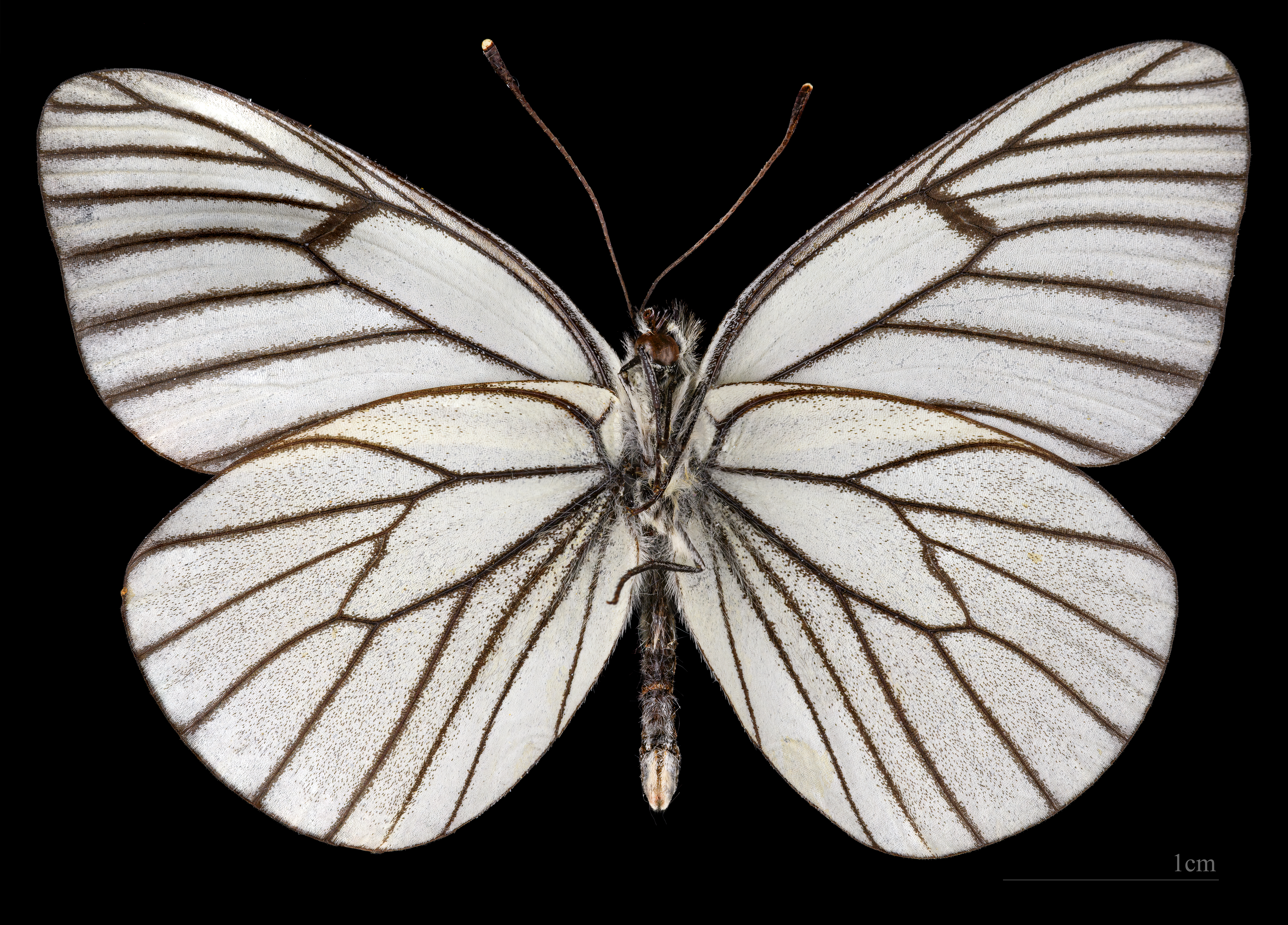
Aporia crataegi augusta ♂ △

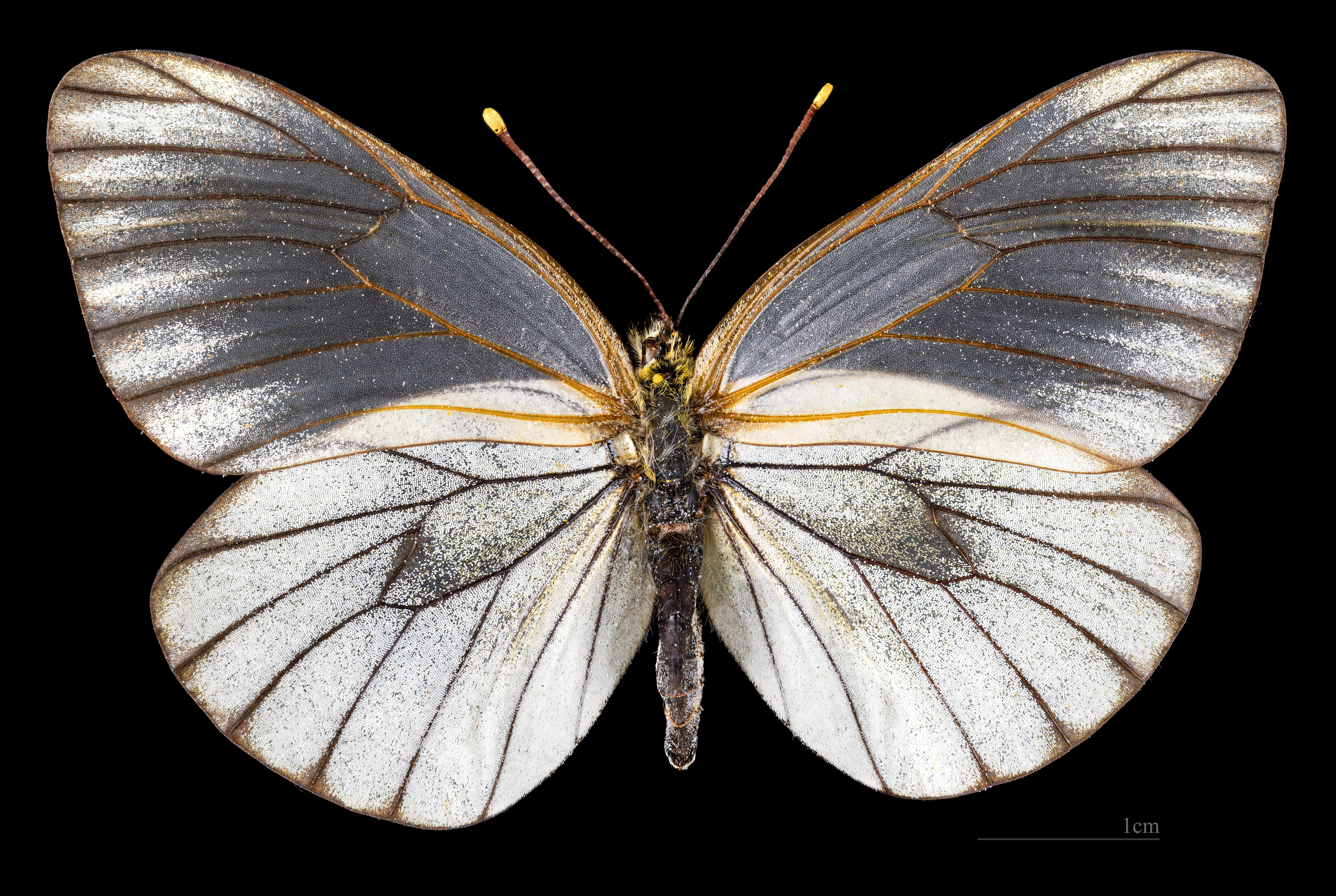
Aporia crataegi augusta ♀

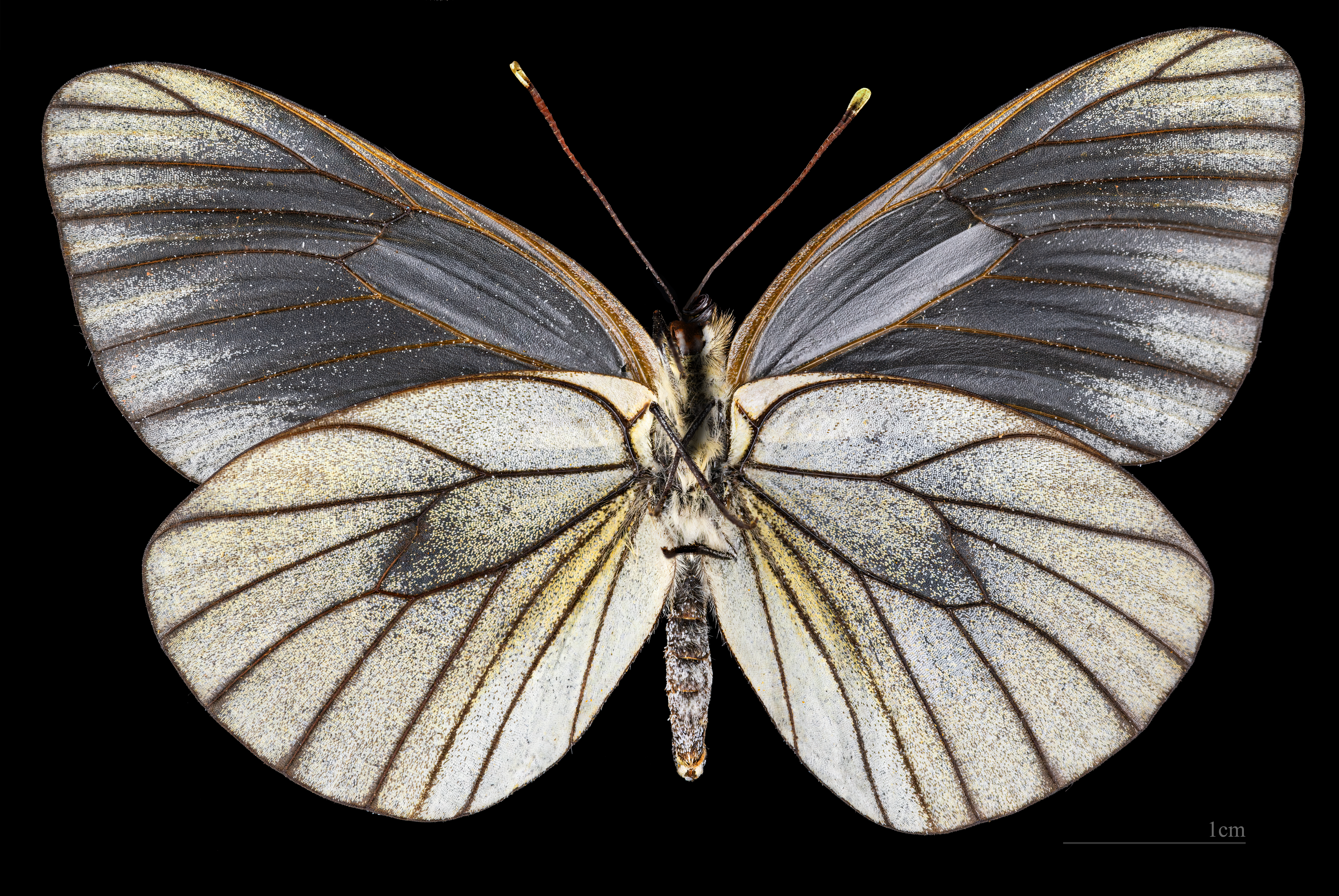
Aporia crataegi augusta ♀ △
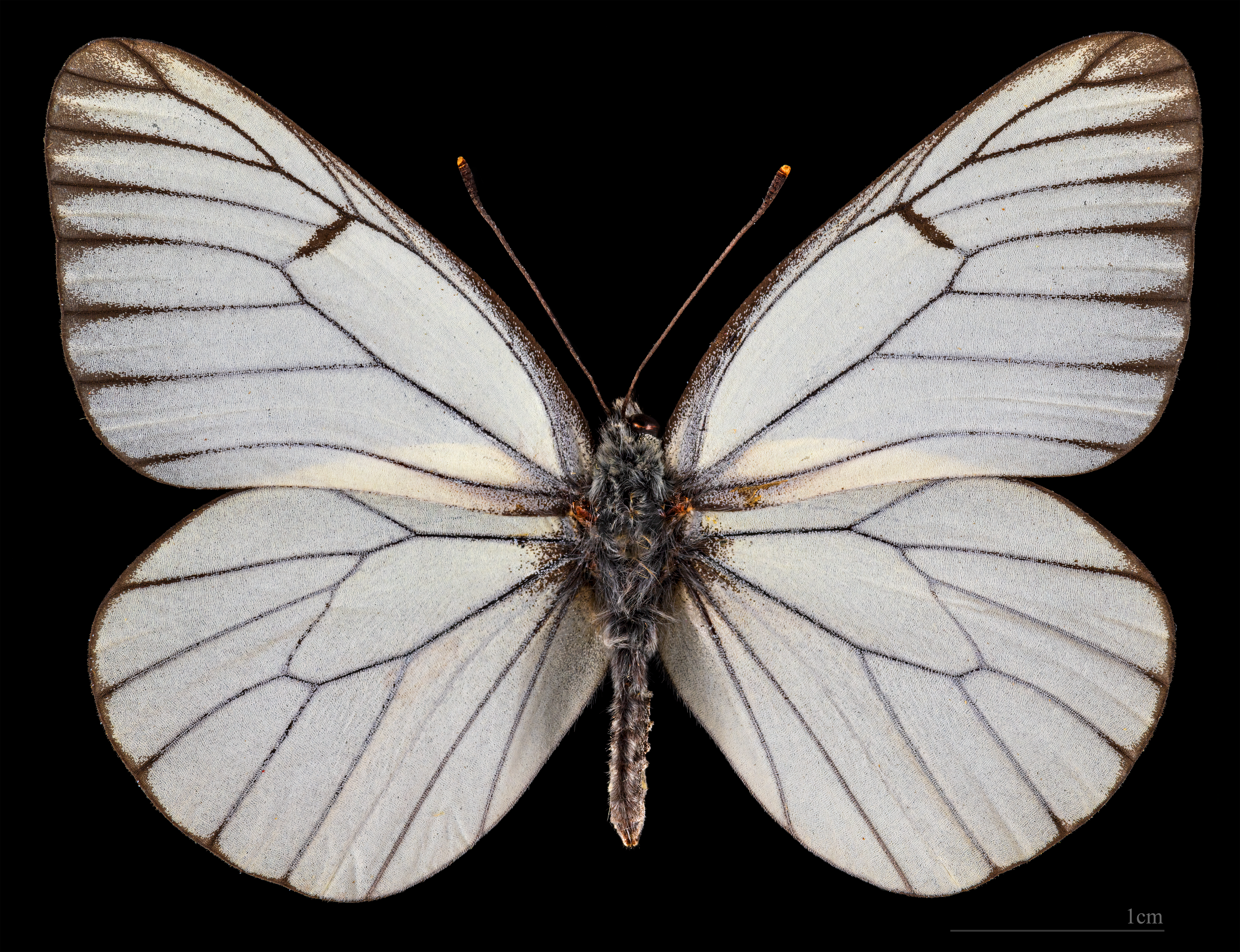
Aporia crataegi transitoria ♂

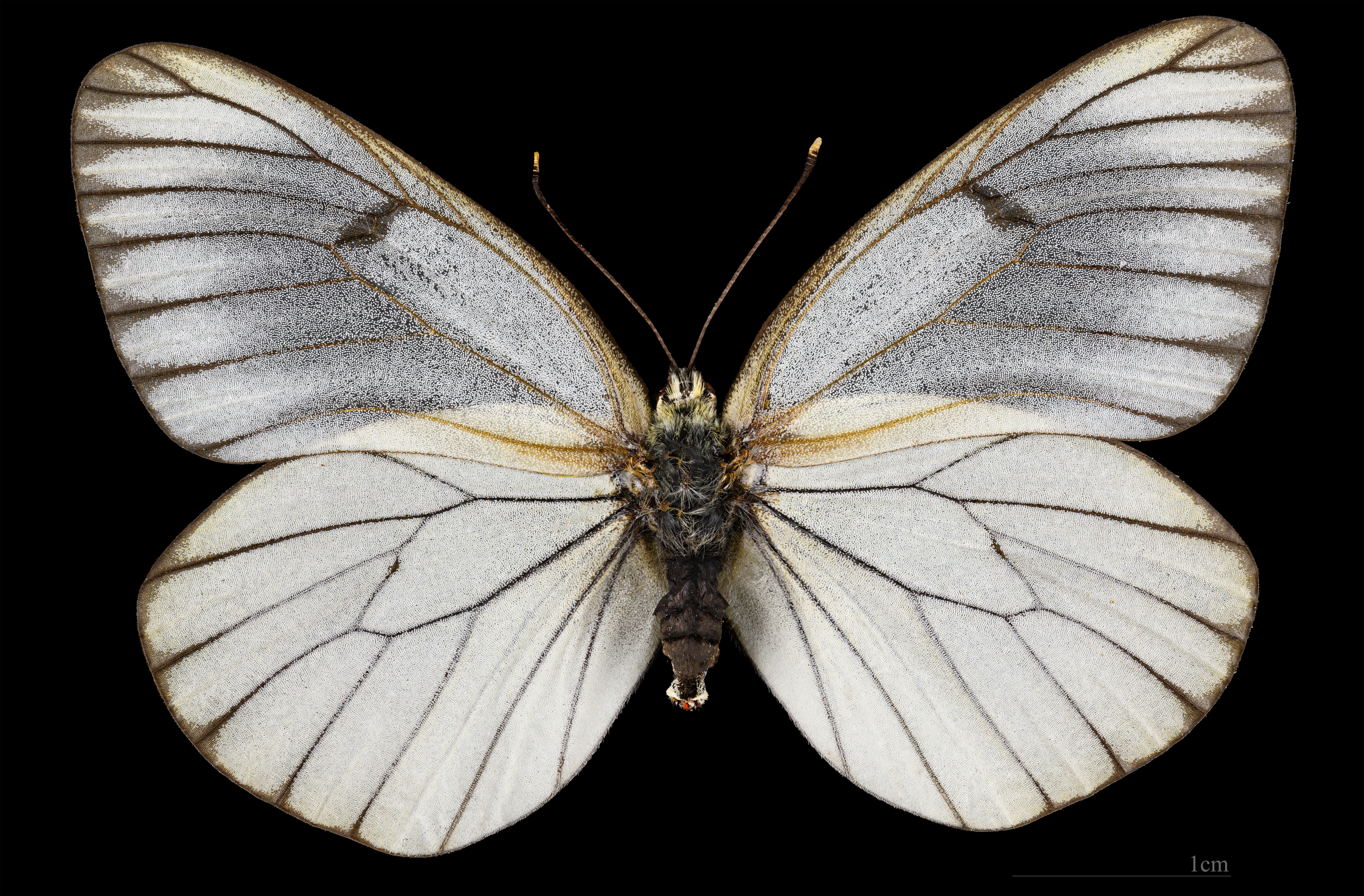
Aporia crataegi transitoria ♀

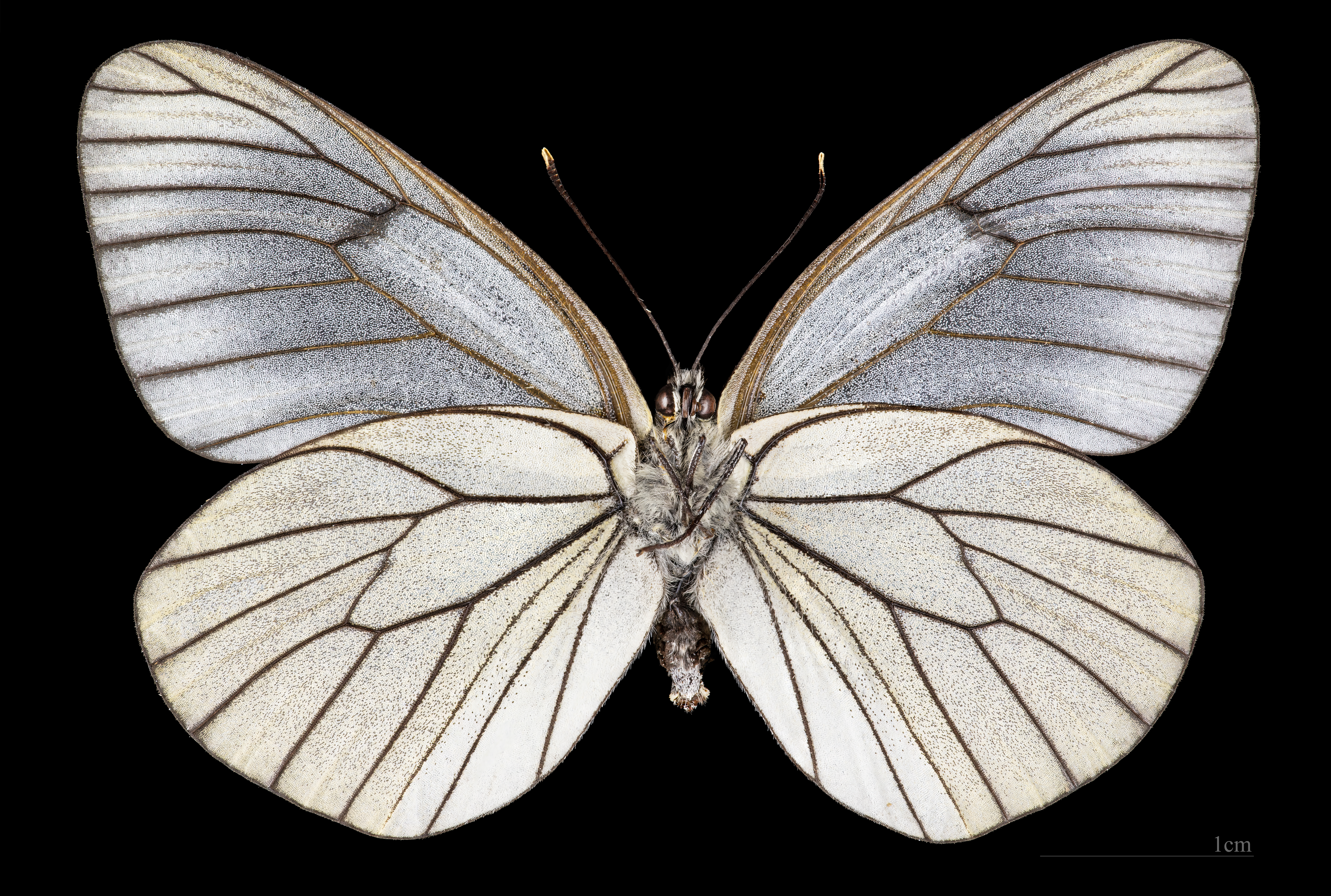
Aporia crataegi transitoria ♀ △

== Distribution and habitat ==
It occurs in open forest, grazing land, orchards. lanes, gardens, meadows and thickets throughout most of Europe, temperate Asia, Korea, and Japan. This species has been extirpated from the British Isles, but unofficial attempts have been made to reintroduce this species in southern England.

== Description ==
The black-veined white has a wingspan of 51 to 70 mm (2.0 to 2.8 in). Females are commonly larger than males. The upperside of both forewings and hindwings is a translucent white boldly veined with black. The underside is similar in the male but the female has brown veining. Moreover, the female loses most of her scales by rubbing her wings together, resulting almost-transparent.

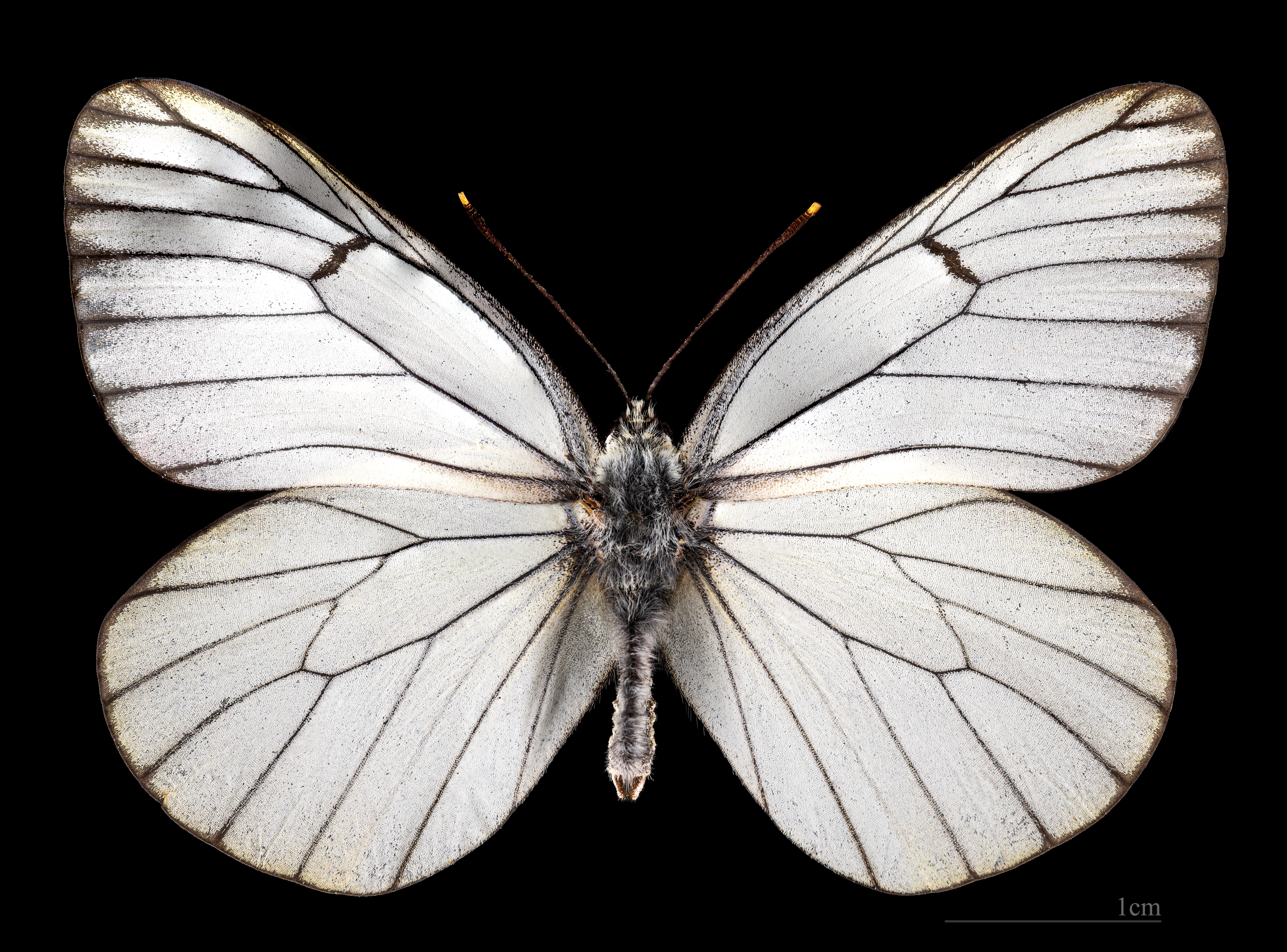
Aporia crataegi ♂

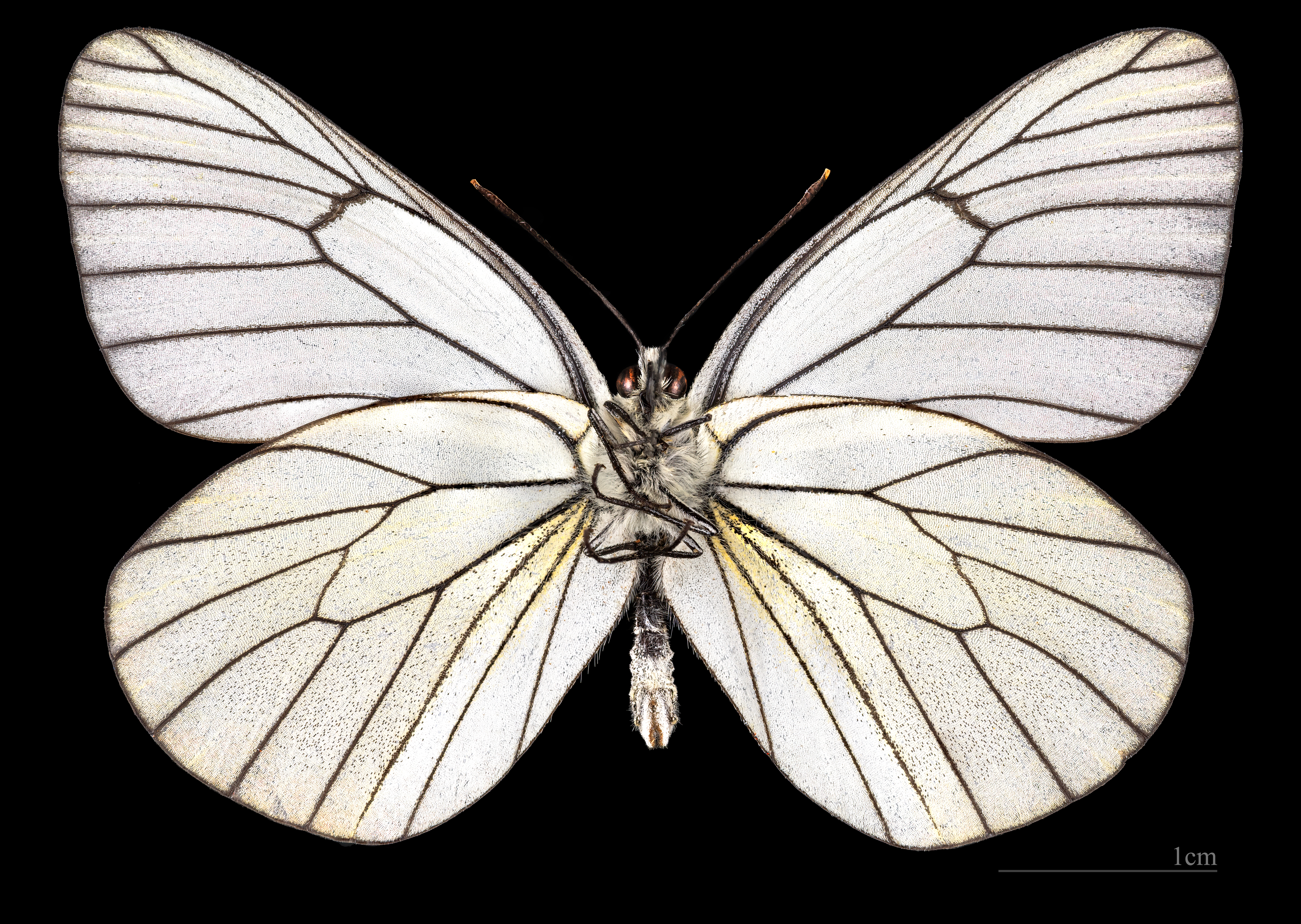
Aporia crataegi ♂ △

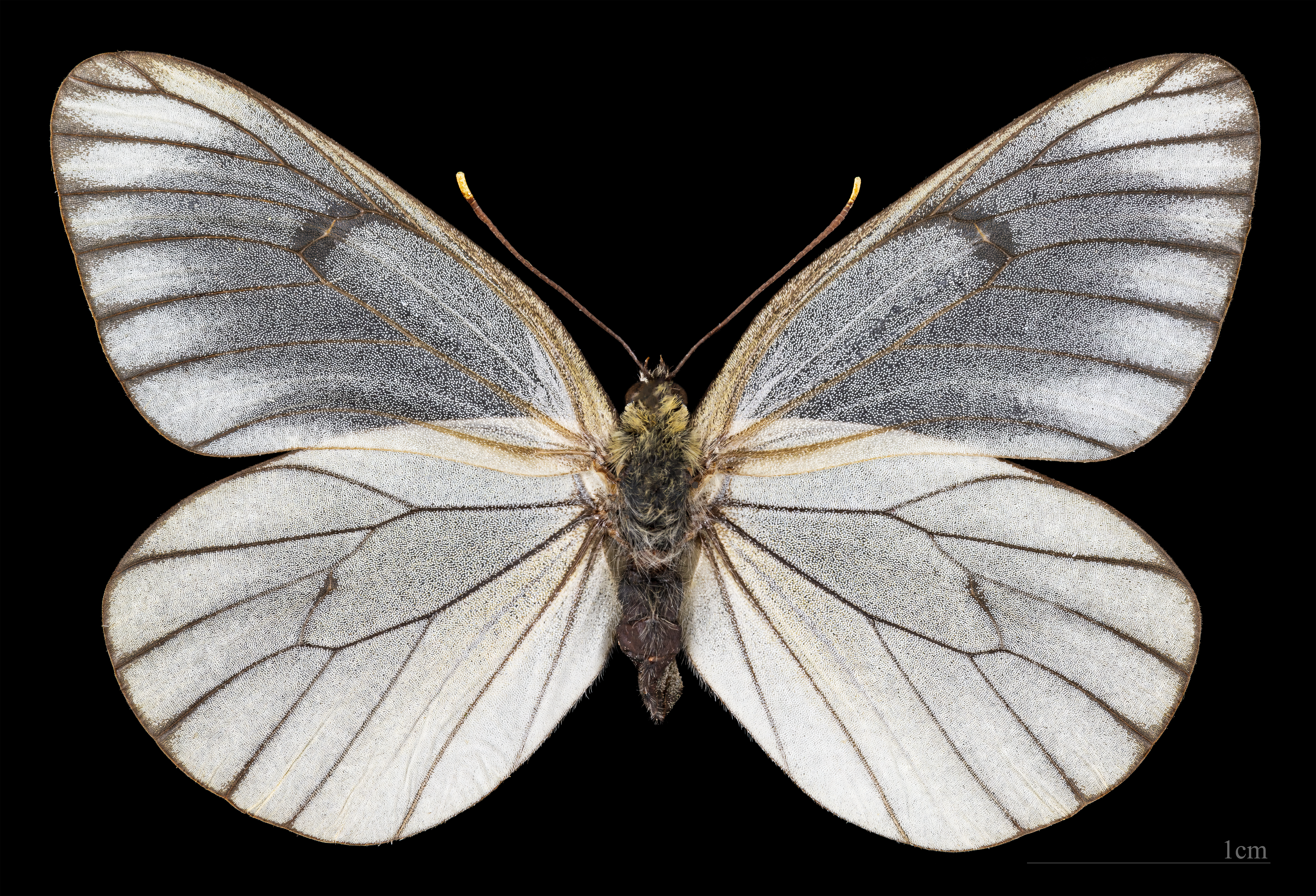
Aporia crataegi ♀

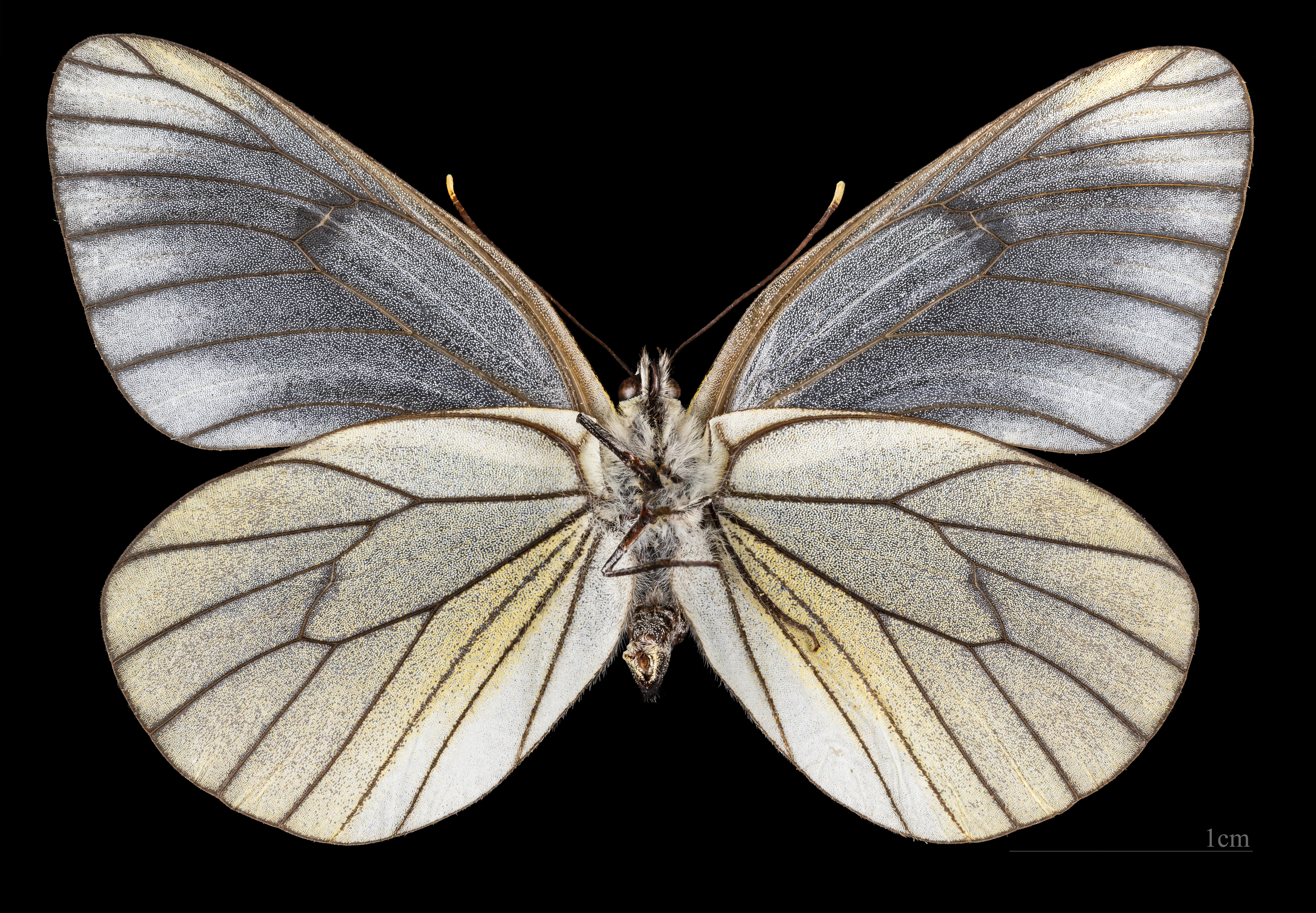
Aporia crataegi ♀ △

This butterfly can be distinguished from other members of white butterflies of the genus Pieris by its distinctive veined wings.

The eggs are yellow at first, darkening with age. The caterpillars are greenish grey with transverse banding. The pupa is creamy white, marked with black, attached by a silken girdle to a twig.

== Description in Seitz ==
crataegi. A. crataegi L. (17 a). White, with thin black veins, the female with a large sparsely scaled discal area on the forewing; underside similar to upper. The whole of Europe and North Asia, going far northwards and extending in North Africa southwards to the slopes of the Aures Mts.; not in Egypt. In ab. alepica Cosmorici (17 a) all the wings are transparent. The form augusta Tur. (19 a) has the cross-veins more distinctly black and the nervules are more strongly dusted with black at the distal margin, all the veins being more broadly edged with black beneath: from Sicily. — hyalina subsp. nov., from the Taurus (south Asia Minor), is pure white in male, with thin dark veins, the tips of the same being scarcely perceptibly darkened; the female not quite so transparent as in alepica, the dark edges of the veins being distally faint but broad, and the cross-veins of the forewing being more densely shaded with black. — pellucida subsp. nov., from Aidere, is sparsely scaled in both sexes, but the dark vein-streaks extend farther basad; beneath, the hindwing and the apex of the forewing have a yellowish tint, the veins of the forewing being rather broadly edged with fuscous. — Tutt enumerates, besides, the following aberrations: suffusa are specimens shaded with fuscous; marginata are individuals with a distinct black distal marginal band to the hindwing (somewhat reminding one of Colias edusa); lunulata has the disco-cellulars of the hindwing broadly marked with black, forming a distinct black halfmoon;melana has fuscous stripes between the veins of the underside of the hindwing: flava are entirely yellow specimens. — Larva clothed with short whitish hairs; ashy grey, dorsally black, with two orange-yellow or brown-red stripes and above the legs a reddish-yellow line; head, thoracical legs and anal legs black; on Prunus, Pirus and Crataegus, adult in May. Pupa whitish with dots united to form stars. Egg conical, yellowish. The butterfly is locally still very frequent, though its abundance and range have considerably diminished in consequence of the systematic destruction of the winter-nests and the war against the black- thorn-hedges. From former times swarms and migrating flocks of this butterfly are on record, and the "oracle of the blood-rain" is attributed to the dark red excretions of the butterflies of which large numbers had emerged from the pupae on a small space. The species appears to be commonest in Central Europe; Dr. Seitz found the insect more singly in East Asia and likewise in Algiers, where he met with it near Lambeze in June. A. crataegi is rarer in southern Japan than in the north of that country, likewise in Amurland, where it flies together with A. hippia.

== Biology ==
The flight period of the black-veined white is between April and July. The adults are quite social and their abundance varies greatly from year to year. The eggs are laid on the food plant, usually a member of the rose family Rosaceae and often on trees and bushes (Malus domestica, Malus × kaido, Pyrus communis, Pyrus serotina, Sorbus intermedia, Hedlundia hybrida (formerly Sorbus hybrida), Sorbus aucuparia, Crataegus monogyna, Crataegus oxyacantha, Crataegus jozana, Prunus spinosa, Prunus padus, Prunus ssiori, Betula spp., Salix phylicifolia, Chaenomeles lagenaria).

The eggs are laid in groups of 30 to 100. They take about three weeks to hatch. The caterpillars tend to remain in a group with a communal larval web. This species has one generation each year. The caterpillars overwinter communally in a webbing tent with entwined leaves. Caterpillars feed close together on the leaves of the food plant at first, before dispersing in the later developmental stages to other parts of the tree.

The pupal stage lasts about three weeks.

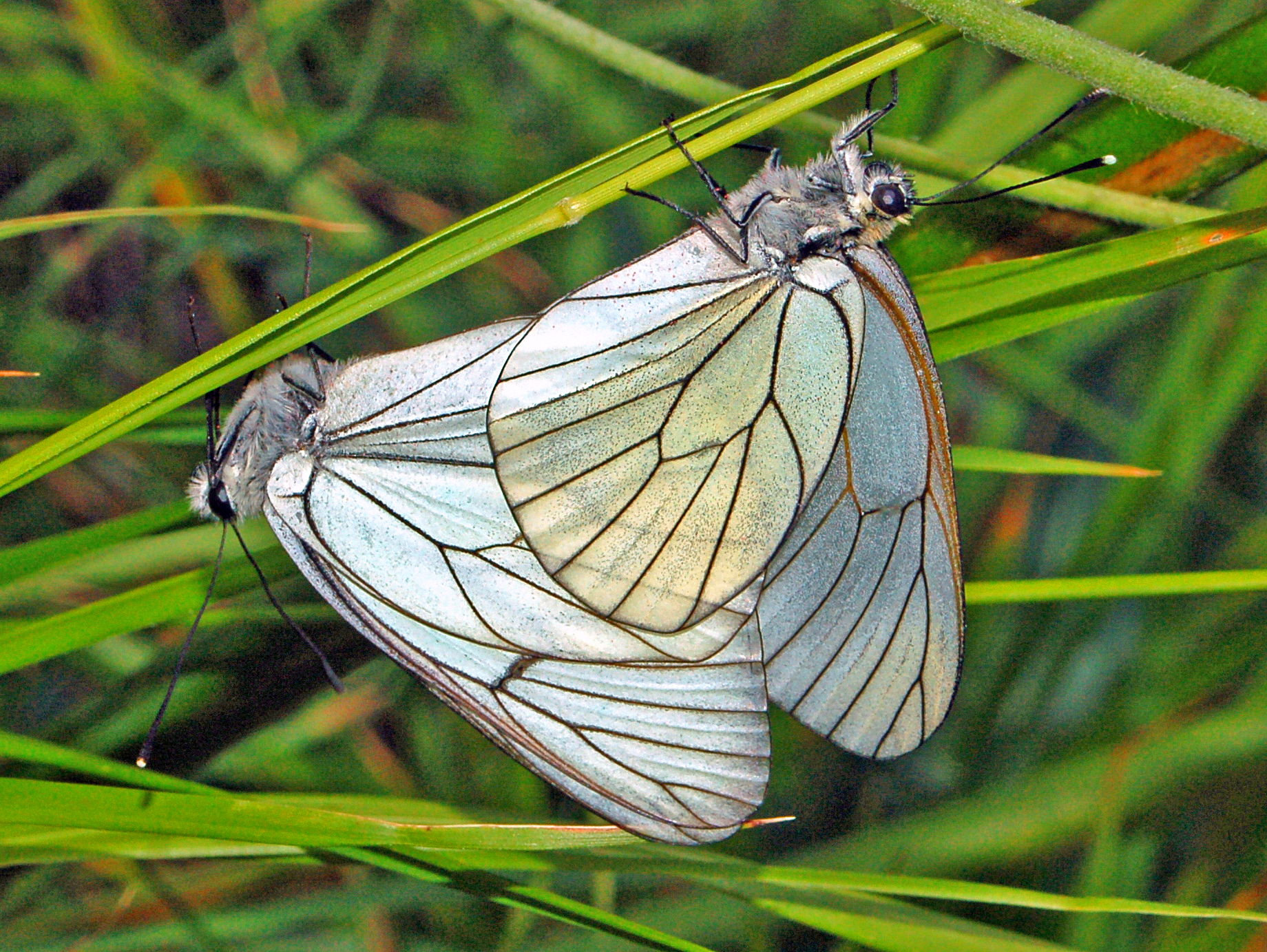
Mating pair

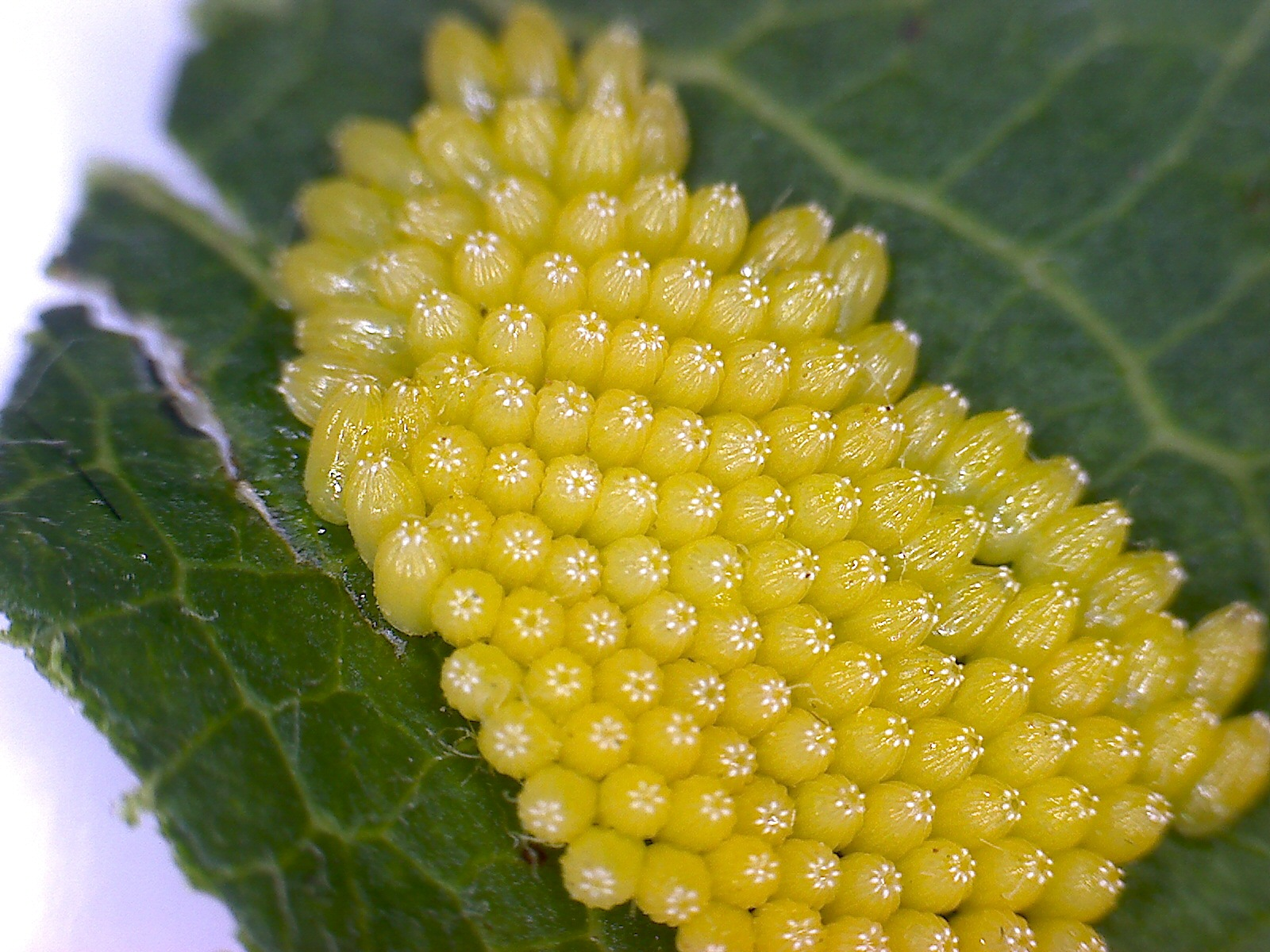
Eggs

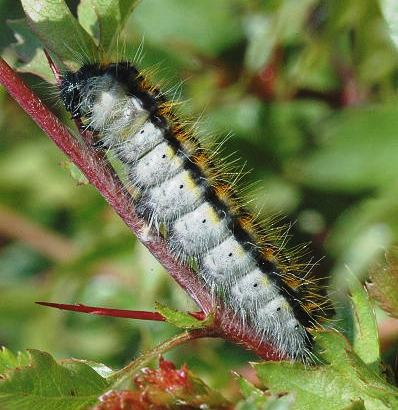
Larva

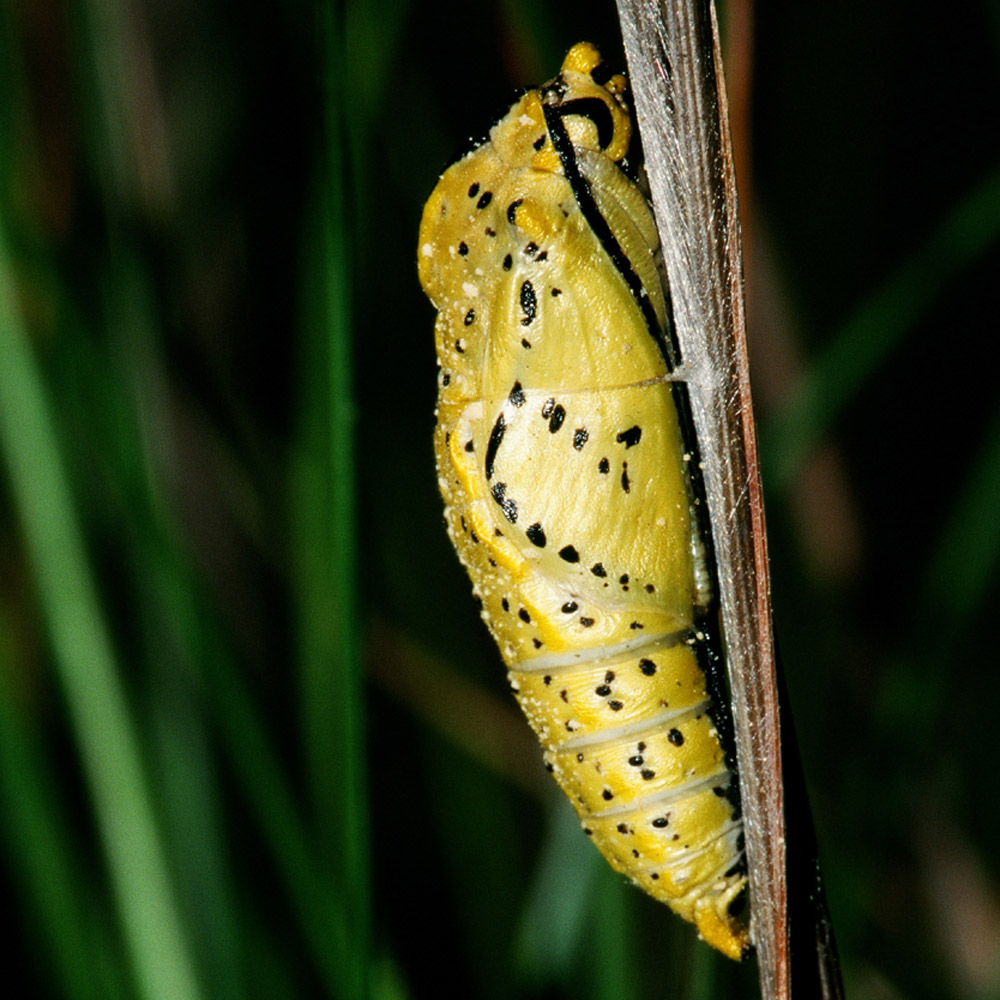
Pupa

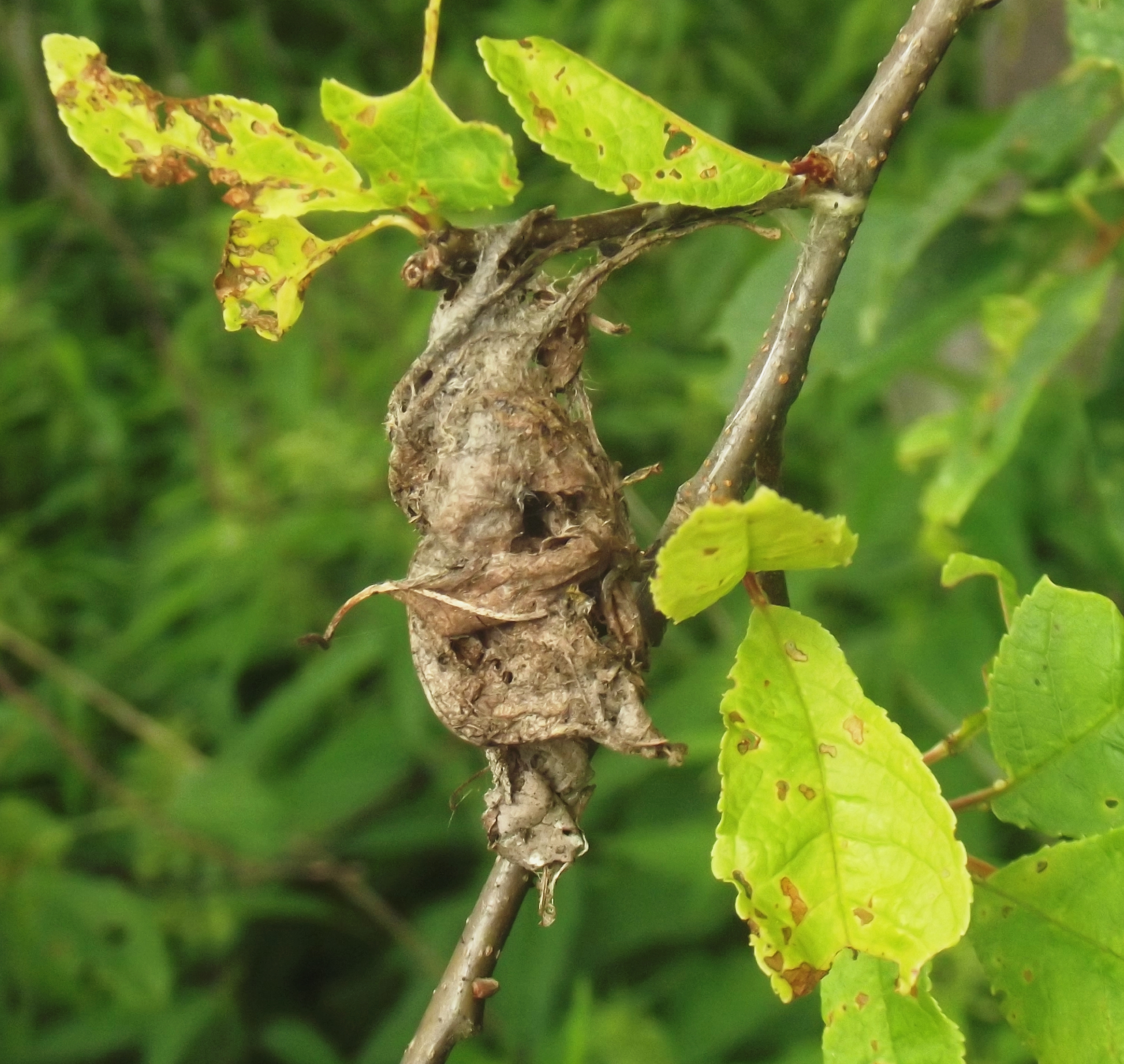
Winter nest

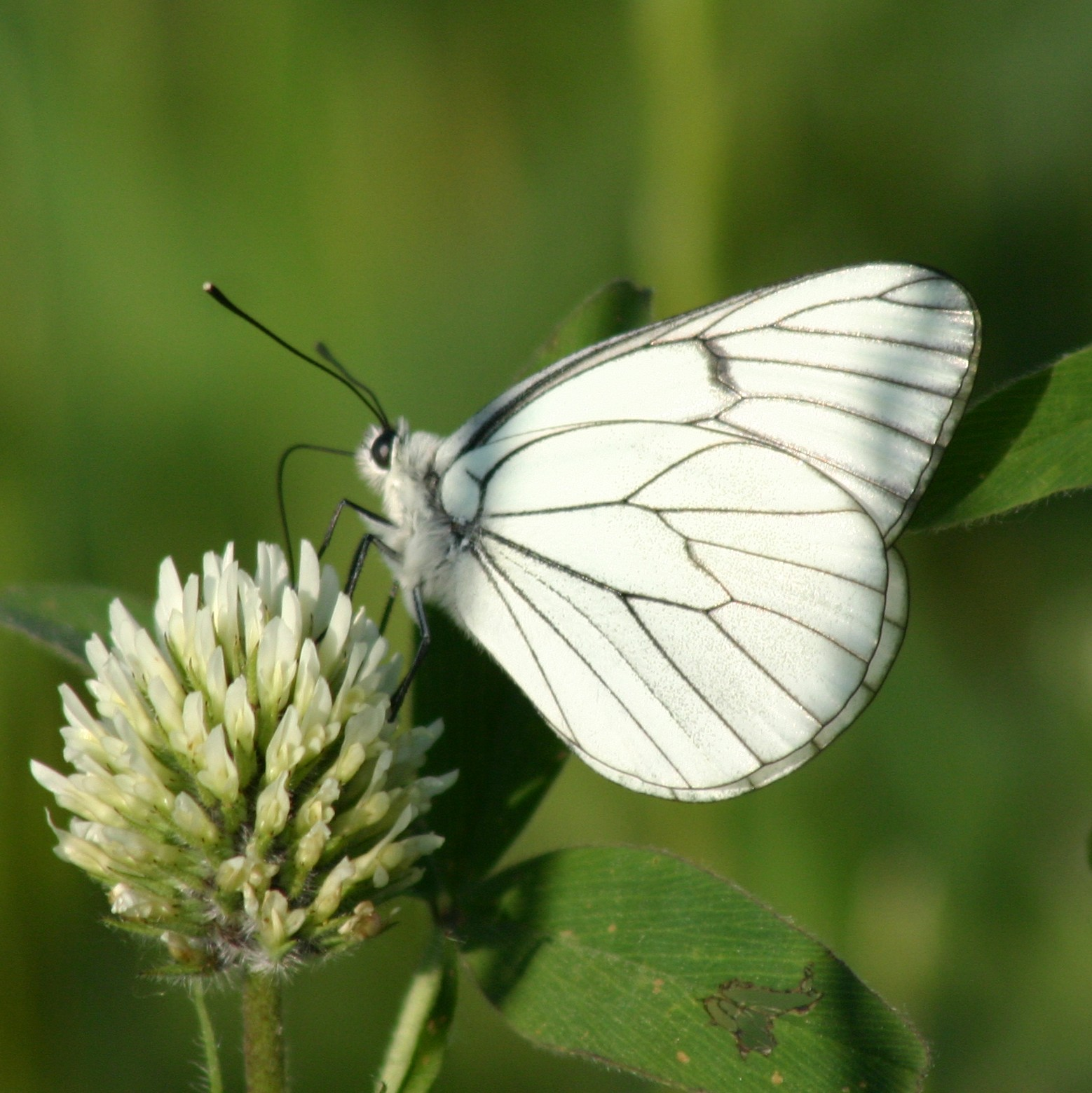
Imago
