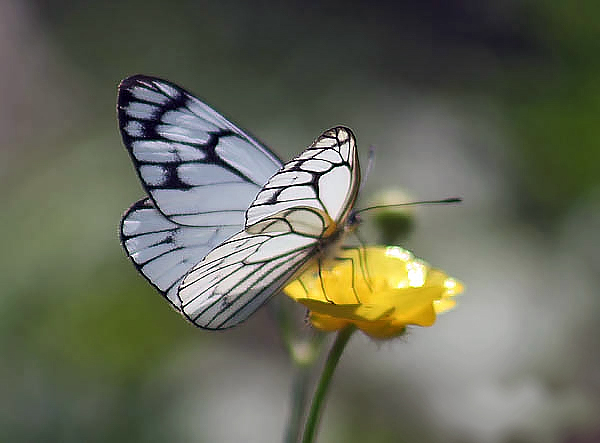

Scientific classification
- Kingdom: Animalia
- Phylum: Arthropoda
- Clade: Pancrustacea
- Class: Insecta
- Order: Lepidoptera
- Family: Pieridae
- Genus: Aporia
- Species: A. leucodice

Binomial name
- Aporia leucodice (Eversmann, 1843)

= Aporia leucodice =

Himalayan blackvein

Species of butterfly

Aporia leucodice, the Himalayan blackvein, is a mid-sized to large butterfly of the family Pieridae which is found in India.

== See also ==
- Pieridae
- List of butterflies of India
- List of butterflies of India (Pieridae)
