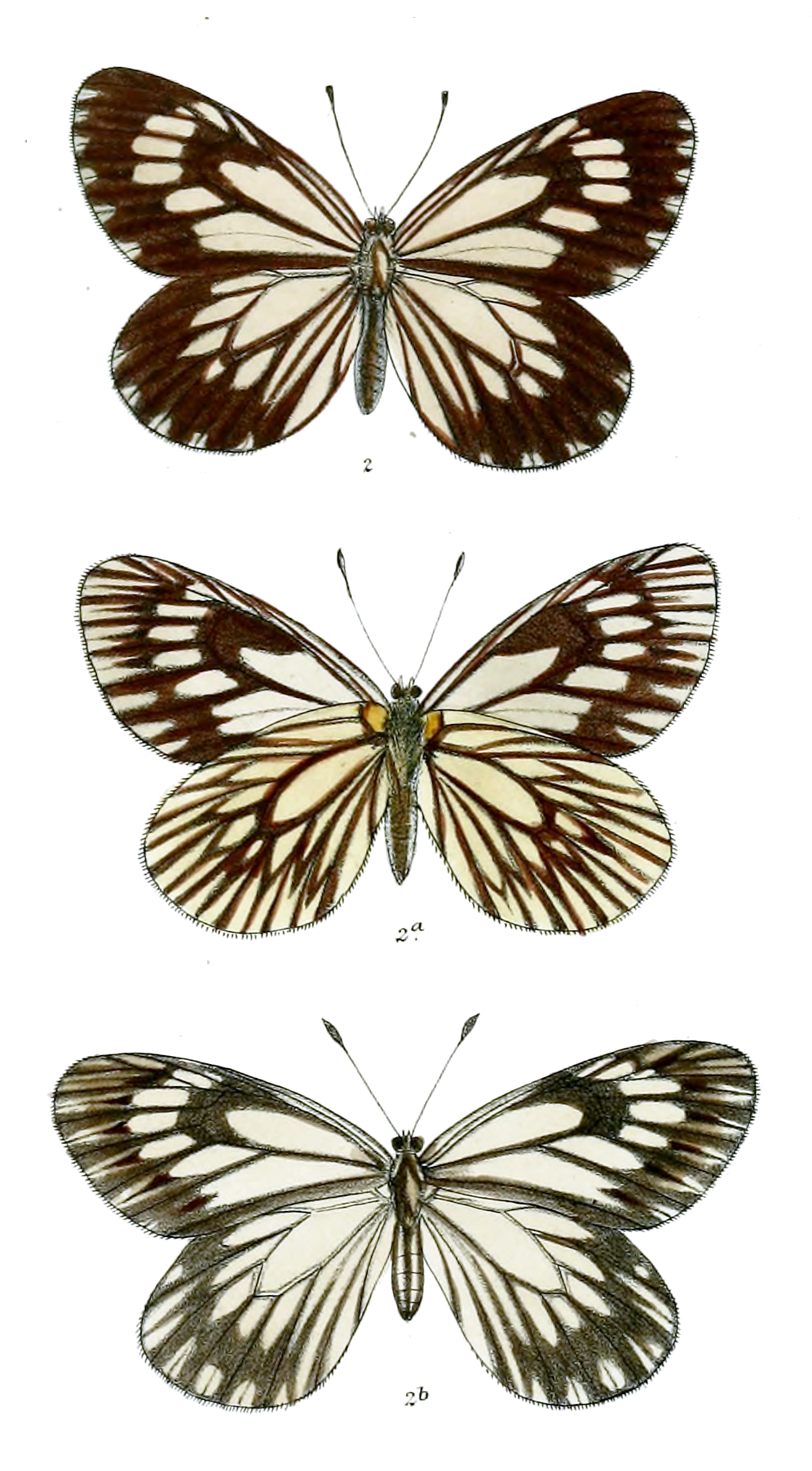

Scientific classification
- Kingdom: Animalia
- Phylum: Arthropoda
- Class: Insecta
- Order: Lepidoptera
- Family: Pieridae
- Genus: Aporia
- Species: A. harrietae

Binomial name
- Aporia harrietae (de Nicéville, 1892)

= Aporia harrietae =

Bhutan blackvein

Species of butterfly

Aporia harrietae, the Bhutan blackvein, is a mid-sized to large butterfly of the family Pieridae, that is, the yellows and whites, which is found in Bhutan and possibly in India.

== Description ==
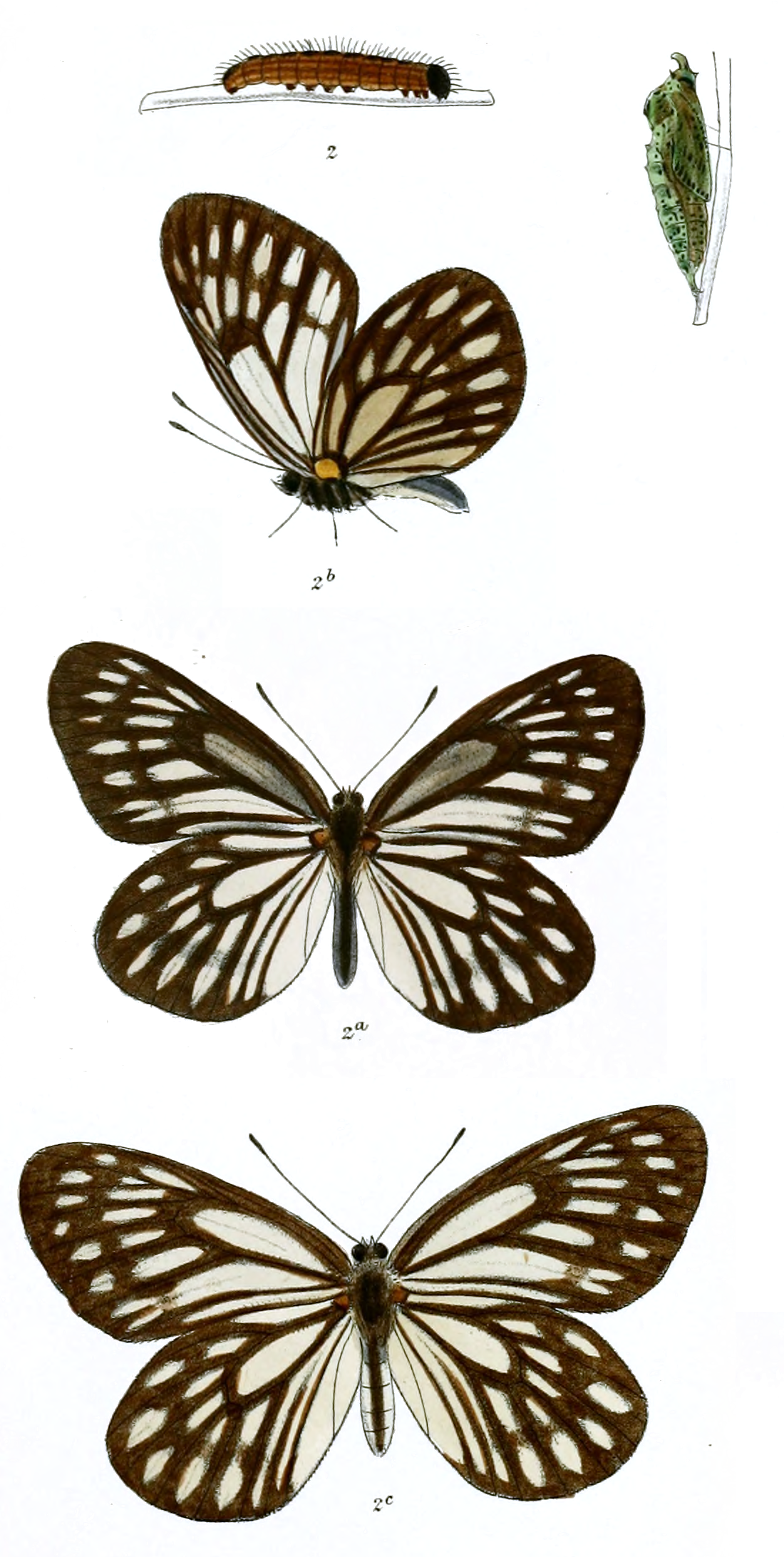

The male has black on the upperside of the wings with a thin white streak at the base of the forewing margin and a large and pointed whitish patch in the basal part of the discoidal cell and another patch in interspace 1. A series of oval spots are present along the edge. The hindwing has the basal veins white with black sides

The hindwing has the veins on the basal half of the wing defined with white, broadly margined on both sides with black; the discoidal cell almost entirely creamy white; there is a very narrow costal and a wide subcostal streak, then five spots one in each interspace beyond the cell, that in the second median interspace (interspace 3) the smallest; two elongated streaks in the submedian interspace (interspace 1), the inner one almost reaching to the margin of the wing, the outer one reaching to about halfway between the base of the wing and the margin; two basal white streaks occupying the whole of the interspaces divided by the internal vein (vein 1a); marginal diffused spots as in the forewing, but each spot divided into two by the black internervular fold. Underside: differs from the upperside only in having on the outer margin from the costa to the second median vein (vein 3) a decreasing series of duplicated white streaks, one pair in each interspace, a small white spot in the two following interspaces. Hindwing has at the extreme base of the wing within the precostal nervure the usual bright yellow patch characteristic of the genus; all the creamy-white markings of the upperside are pale yellow; the markings differ from those on the upperside by the presence of a pair of elongated wedge-shaped pale yellow streaks in each interspace, each streak has its apex pointed, its base (which is placed on the outer margin) broad. Cilia of both wings on both sides black.

Female differs from the male only in being somewhat paler throughout.(Lionel de Nicéville quoted in Bingham)

== See also ==
- Pieridae
- List of butterflies of India
- List of butterflies of India (Pieridae)
