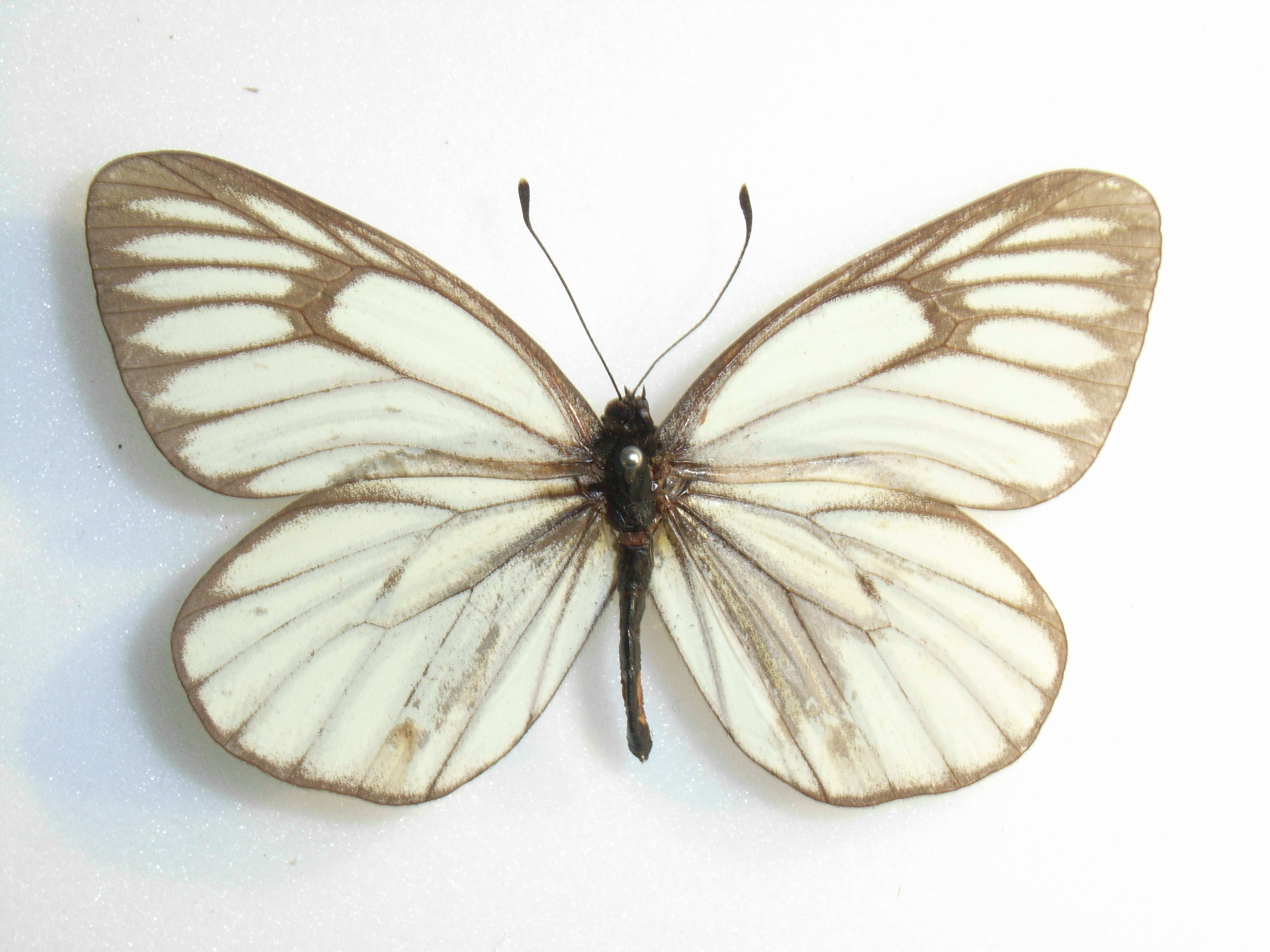

Scientific classification
- Kingdom: Animalia
- Phylum: Arthropoda
- Class: Insecta
- Order: Lepidoptera
- Family: Pieridae
- Genus: Aporia
- Species: A. hippia

Binomial name
- Aporia hippia (Bremer, 1861)

Synonyms
- Pieris hippia Bremer, 1861

= Aporia hippia =

Species of butterfly

Aporia hippia is a butterfly of the family Pieridae. It is found in the Russian Far East (Amur region, Ussuri), Korea, Japan, China, and Mongolia.

The forewing length is 25–40 mm (0.98–1.57 in).

The larvae feed on Berberis species, including Berberis amurensis and Berberis thunbergii.

== Subspecies ==
There are seven subspecies:

- Aporia hippia hippia
- Aporia hippia crataegoides
- Aporia hippia japonica (Japan)
- Aporia hippia kreitneri
- Aporia hippia occidentalis (Transbaikalia)
- Aporia hippia taupingi
- Aporia hippia thibetana (Manchuria)

Aporia hippia taupingi might be synonym of Aporia hippia thibetana.
