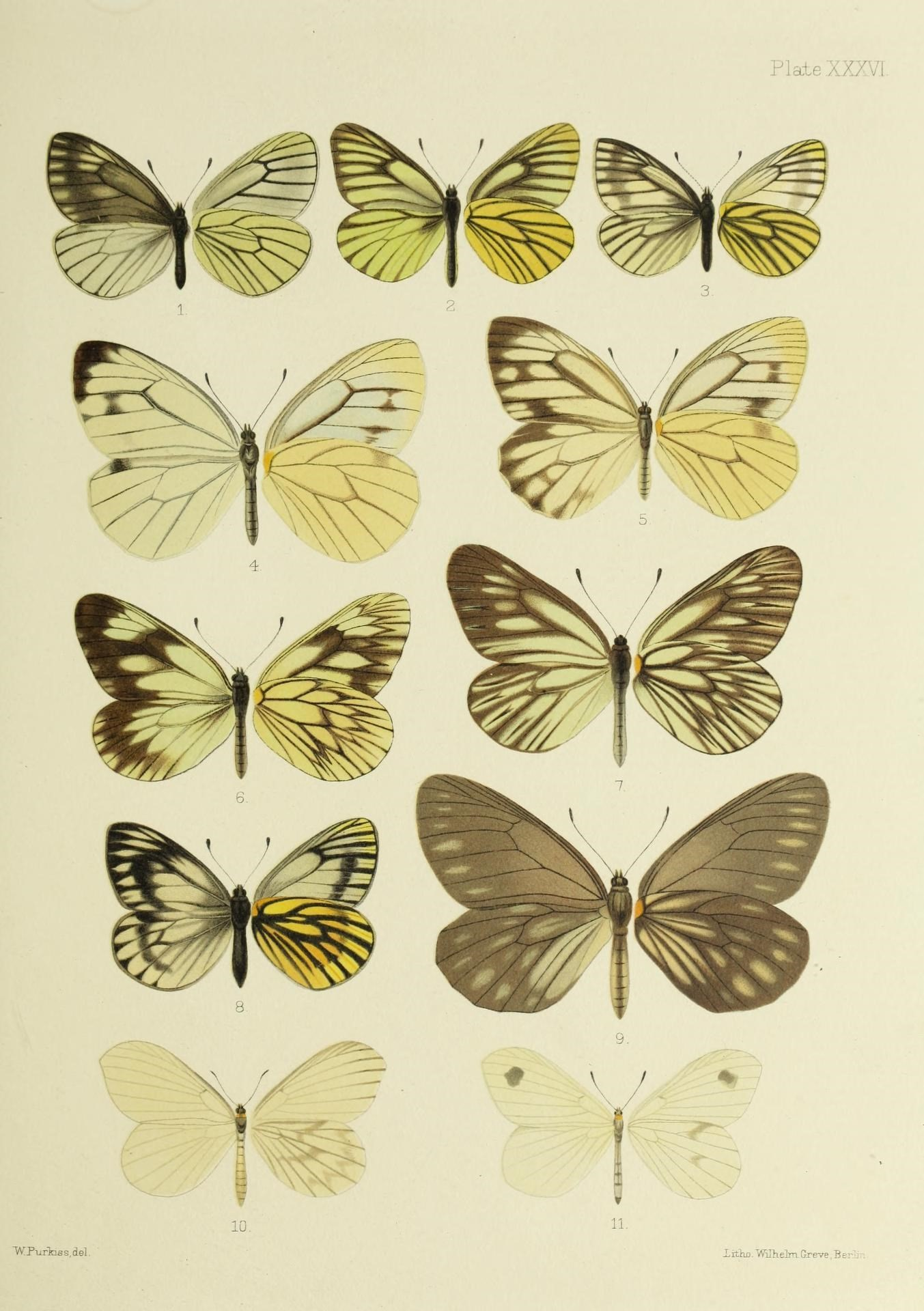
- A.a. lotis in Leech, J. H., Butterflies from China, Japan and Corea 1892-1893 (fig. 6).

Scientific classification
- Kingdom: Animalia
- Phylum: Arthropoda
- Class: Insecta
- Order: Lepidoptera
- Family: Pieridae
- Genus: Aporia
- Species: A. acraea

Binomial name
- Aporia acraea (Oberthür, 1885)

Synonyms
- Pieris acraea Oberthür, 1885; Pieris lotis Leech, 1890; Metaporia acraea funkei Draeseke 1924

= Aporia acraea =

Butterfly species of genus Aporia

Aporia acraea is a butterfly species in family Pieridae. The species occurs in China, where it is found in western Sichuan and northern Yunnan.

== Former subspecies ==
- Aporia acraea wolongensis (now Aporia wolongensis)
  - Aporia acraea koiwayai (now Aporia wolongensis koiwayai)
- Aporia acraea tayiensis (now Aporia tayiensis)
- Aporia acraea lotis (junior synonym of Aporia acraea)

== Original description ==
As Pieris acraea, Charles Oberthür in Ragonot, Émile Louis (1885). "Séance du 23 décembre 1885". Annales de la Société entomologique de France. 6: CCXXVI–CCXXVII..
