= Aporia chunhaoi =

Scientific classification
- Kingdom: Animalia
- Phylum: Arthropoda
- Class: Insecta
- Order: Lepidoptera
- Family: Pieridae
- Genus: Aporia
- Species: A. chunhaoi

Binomial name
- Aporia chunhaoi Hu, Zhang & Yang, 2021

Species of butterfly

Aporia chunhaoi is a species of butterfly in the genus Aporia. It is found in northwest Yunnan. Aporia chunahoai is similar to Aporia lhamo, but it can be distinguished by its larger size, paler male hindwing, as well as different genitalia.
