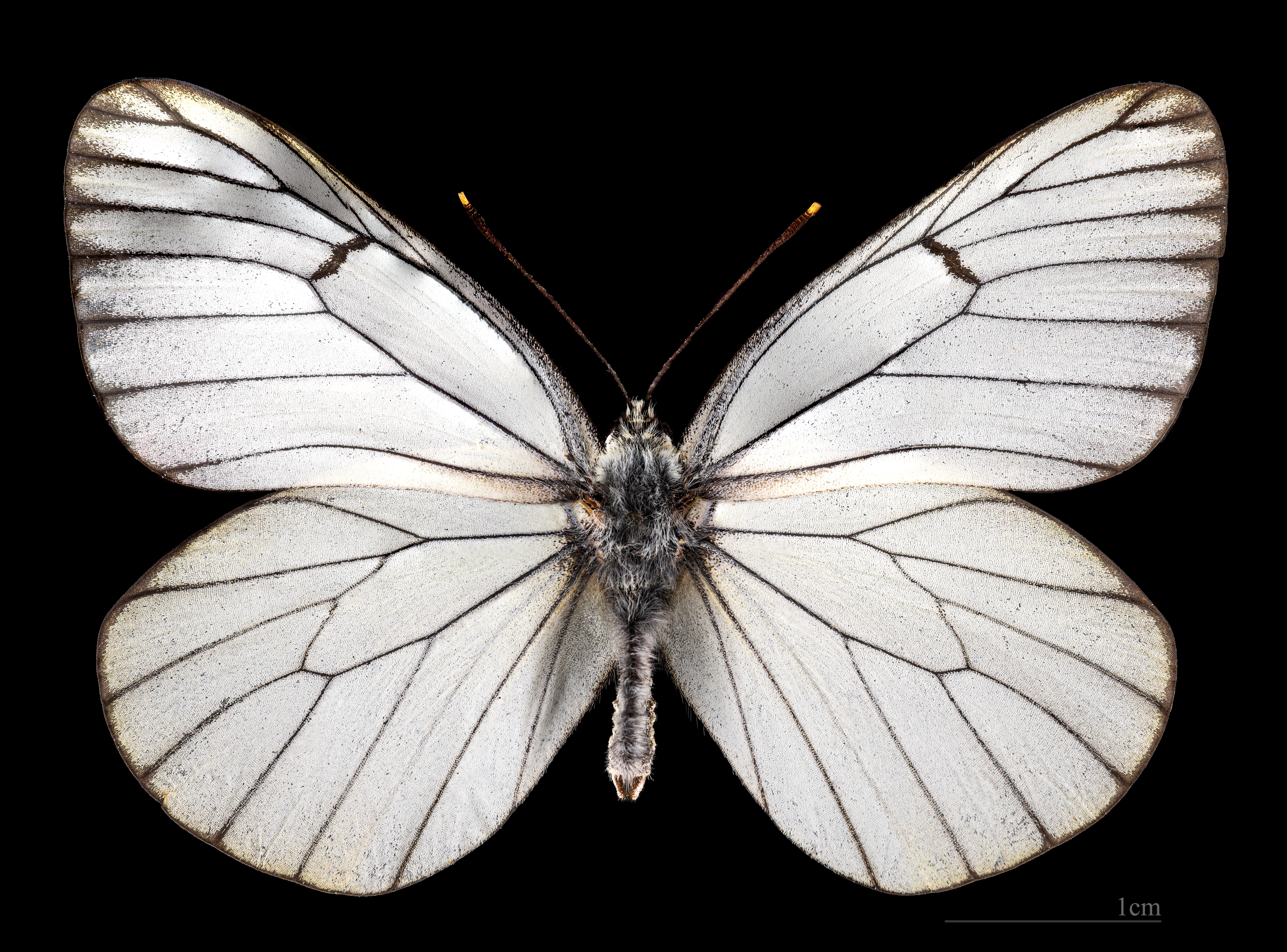
- Aporia crataegi

Scientific classification
- Kingdom: Animalia
- Phylum: Arthropoda
- Class: Insecta
- Order: Lepidoptera
- Family: Pieridae
- Tribe: Pierini
- Genus: Aporia; Hübner, 1819

Synonyms
- Leuconea Donzel, 1837; Metaporia Butler, 1870

= Aporia (butterfly) =

Butterfly genus in family Pieridae

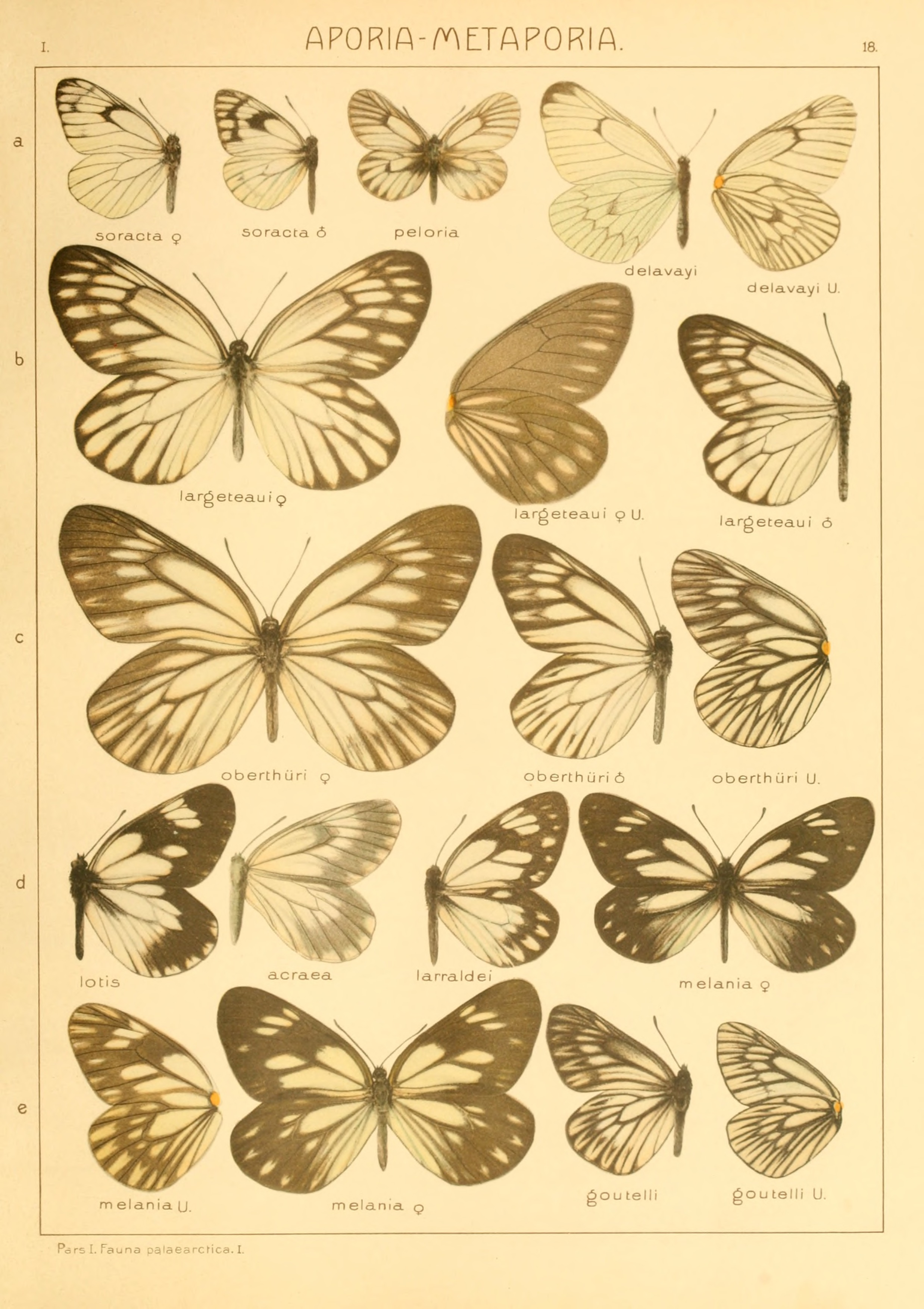
Aporia in Adalbert Seitz's Macrolepidoptera of the World

Aporia, the black-veined whites or blackveins, is a genus of pierid butterflies found in the Palearctic region.

== Species ==
- Aporia acraea (Oberthür, 1885)
- Aporia agathon (Gray, 1831) – great blackvein
- Aporia bernardi Koiwaya, 1989
- Aporia bieti (Oberthür, 1884)
- Aporia chunhaoi Hu, Zhang & Yang, 2021
- Aporia crataegi (Linnaeus, 1758) – black-veined white
- Aporia delavayi (Oberthür, 1890)
- Aporia genestieri (Oberthür, 1902)
- Aporia giacomazzoi Della Bruna, Gallo & Sbordoni, 2003
- Aporia gigantea Koiwaya, 1993
- Aporia goutellei (Oberthür, 1886)
- Aporia harrietae (Nicéville, 1893) – Bhutan blackvein
- Aporia hastata (Oberthür, 1892)
- Aporia hippia (Bremer, 1861)
- Aporia howarthi Bernardi, 1961
- Aporia joubini (Oberthür, 1913)
- Aporia kamei Koiwaya, 1989
- Aporia kanekoi Koiwaya, 1989
- Aporia largeteaui (Oberthür, 1881)
- Aporia larraldei (Oberthür, 1876)
- Aporia lemoulti (Bernardi, 1944)
- Aporia leucodice (Eversmann, 1843) – Himalayan blackvein
- Aporia lhamo (Oberthür, 1893)
- Aporia martineti (Oberthür, 1884)
- Aporia monbeigi (Oberthür, 1917)
- Aporia nabellica (Boisduval, 1836) – dusky blackvein
- Aporia nishimurai Koiwaya, 1989
- Aporia oberthuri (Leech, 1890)
- Aporia potanini Alphéraky, 1889
- Aporia procris Leech, 1890
- Aporia signiana Sugiyama, 1994
- Aporia tayiensis Yoshino, 1995
- Aporia tsinglingica (Verity, 1911)
- Aporia uedai Koiwaya, 1989
- Aporia wolongensis Yoshino, 1995
