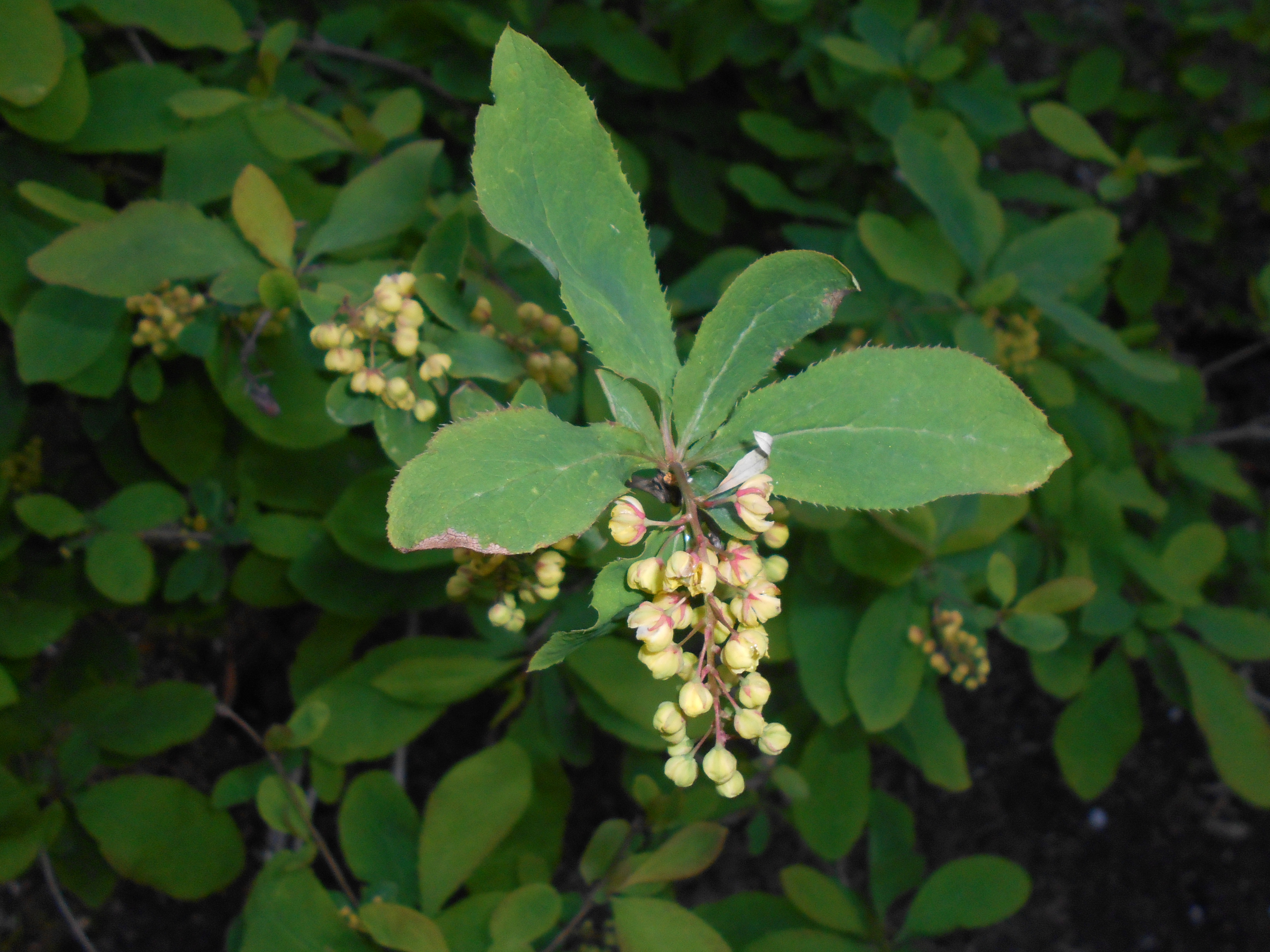

Scientific classification
- Kingdom: Plantae
- Clade: Tracheophytes
- Clade: Angiosperms
- Clade: Eudicots
- Order: Ranunculales
- Family: Berberidaceae
- Genus: Berberis
- Species: B. amurensis

Binomial name
- Berberis amurensis Rupr.

Synonyms
- Berberis amurensis f. bretschneideri (Rehder) Ohwi; Berberis amurensis var. brevifolia Nakai; Berberis amurensis f. brevifolia (Nakai) Ohwi; Berberis amurensis var. japonica (Regel) Rehder; Berberis amurensis var. latifolia Nakai; Berberis amurensis f. latifolia (Nakai) W.Lee; Berberis amurensis var. licentii Ahrendt; Berberis bretschneideri Rehder; Berberis japonica (Regel) C.K.Schneid.; Berberis regeliana Koehne ex C.K.Schneid.; Berberis vulgaris var. amurensis (Rupr.) Regel; Berberis vulgaris var. japonica Regel

= Berberis amurensis =

Species of plant

Berberis amurensis, commonly known as Amur barberry, is a shrub native to Japan, Korea, the Russian Far East, and parts of China (Gansu, Hebei, Heilongjiang, Henan, Jilin, Liaoning, Nei Mongol, Shaanxi, Shandong, Shanxi). It is named for the Amur River, which forms part of the boundary between Russia and China. It is found at elevations of 1100–2900 m.

Berberis amurensis is a shrub up to 350 cm tall with spines up to 20 mm long on the smaller branches. Leaves are elliptical, paper-thin, up to 10 cm long. Flowers are borne in groups of up to 25. Berries are red, oblong, about 10 mm long.
