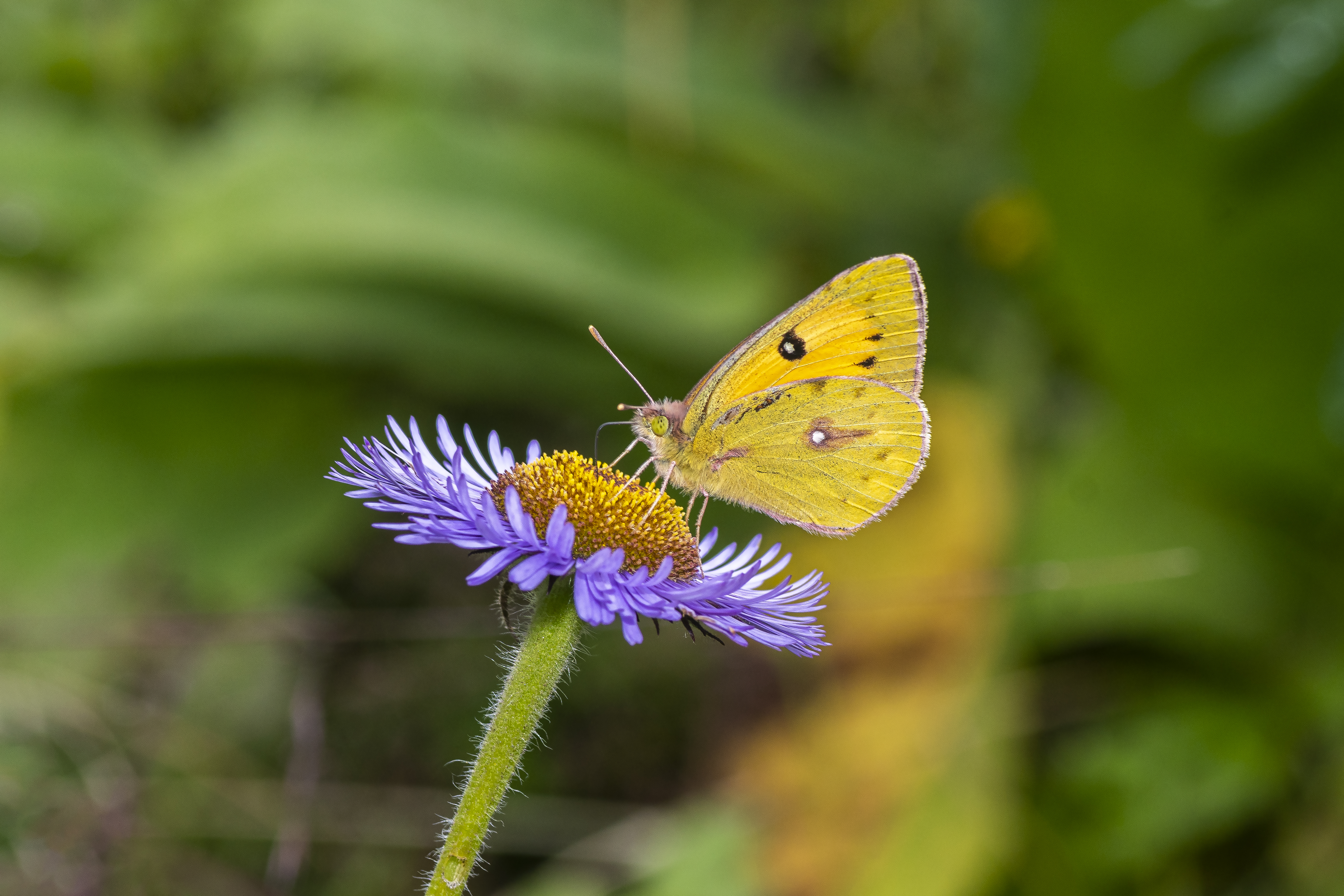
- from Chelela Pass

Scientific classification
- Kingdom: Animalia
- Phylum: Arthropoda
- Class: Insecta
- Order: Lepidoptera
- Family: Pieridae
- Genus: Colias
- Species: C. fieldii

Binomial name
- Colias fieldii Ménétriés, 1855

= Colias fieldii =

Species of butterfly

Colias fieldii, the dark clouded yellow, is a butterfly in the family Pieridae. It is found in southern Iran, India, southern China, Indochina, and Ussuri.

== Biology ==
The larvae feed on Leguminosae species.

== Subspecies ==
- C. f. fieldii Yunnan, India
- C. f. chinensis Verity, 1909 S.Ussuri

== Taxonomy ==
Accepted as a species by Josef Grieshuber & Gerardo Lamas

== Description ==
Charles Thomas Bingham (1907) gives a detailed description:

Race fieldi, Ménétriés

♂.Upperside deep cadmium orange-yellow.Fore wing : a patch of greenish-black scales at extreme base, a pear-shaped black spot on the discocellulars and a broad terminal black border; the last occupies about a fourth of the wing and has its inner margin curved slightly and irregularly crenulate, broader at apex and the tornus than in the middle; the end portions of veins 6, 7, 9 and 10 subterminally pale and conspicuous on the black of the apex. Hind wing : a thin covering of long soft hairs at base, beneath which is a dusting of black scales that is continued outwards along the posterior half of the wing; dorsum broadly pale yellow; terminal border broadly black, broadest in the middle, its inner margin crenulate; discocellular spot large, consisting of a small patch on which the ground-colour is paler and brighter and that encloses two somewhat obscure dusky rings, the upper one minute. Cilia of both fore and hind wings broadly salmon-pink. Underside : light orange-yellow, the costal margin narrowly, terminal fourth of the fore wing and the whole surface of the hind wing overlaid with pale dull green; the costa, termen and dorsum, with the cilia of both fore and hind wings, salmon-pink.Fore wing : discocellular spot as on the upperside but centred with silvery white; a postdiscal transverse Aeries of black spots, obsolescent and curved inwards anteriorly, conspicuous and increasing in size posteriorly. Hind wing : a discocellular double spot conspicuous silvery and circled by a diffuse salmon-pink ring, followed by a very obscure, almost obsolete, transverse, post-discal series of pinkish spots. Antennae, head and thorax anteriorly salmon-pink, club of antennae darkening to brown;thorax and abdomen dusky greenish black; beneath : palpi, thorax and abdomen yellow. Sex-mark, a patch of thickly set light yellow scales at base of interspace 7 on the upperside of the hind wing. ♀ . Differs from the ♂ as follows : ♀ Upperside: the irroration of black scales at the base of the wings more extensive, especially on the hind wing; the black on the subterminal margins broader, its inner edge on both fore and hind wings more irregular and somewhat diffuse; on the fore wing the black is transversely traversed by a series of bright yellow spots, the anterior four small, obliquely placed, the posterior one large; on the hind wing the discocellular patch is without the central dark rings con-spicuous in the ♂, and there is an obscure postdiscal curved transverse series of yellow spots bordering the black on the terminal margin. Underside : precisely similar to that of the ♂ .Antennae, head, thorax and abdomen on the upperside iis in the ♂; beneath : the palpi and thorax more or less salmon-pink.

Exp. ♂,♀ 50-64 mm. (1.98-2.5").

Hab. The Himalayas from Chitral to Sikhim and Bhutan, from 2500 to 14,000 feet; extending to Assam, Upper Burma and

China.

— Charles Thomas Bingham

== Gallery ==
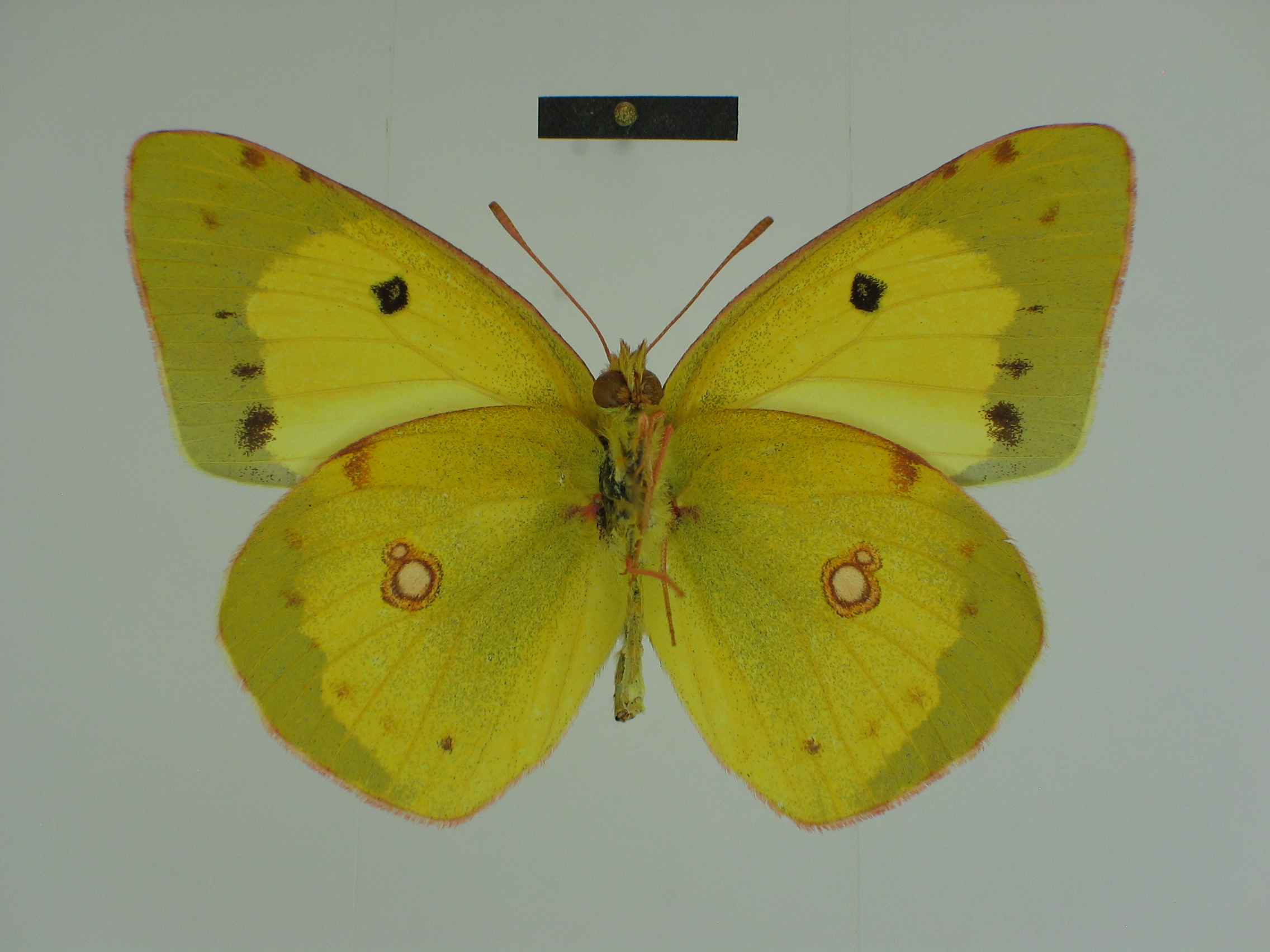
Ventral view (male)

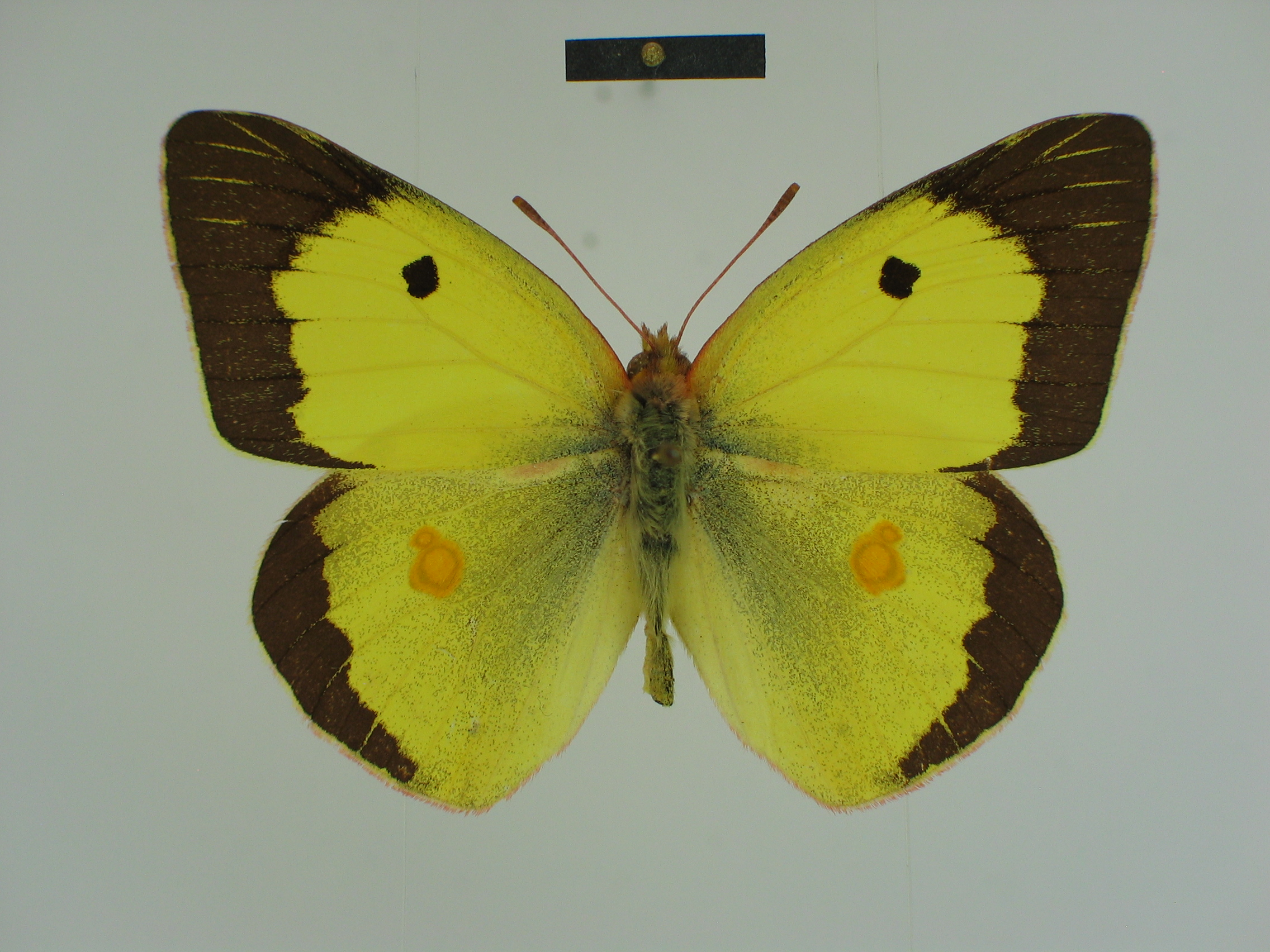
Dorsal view (male)

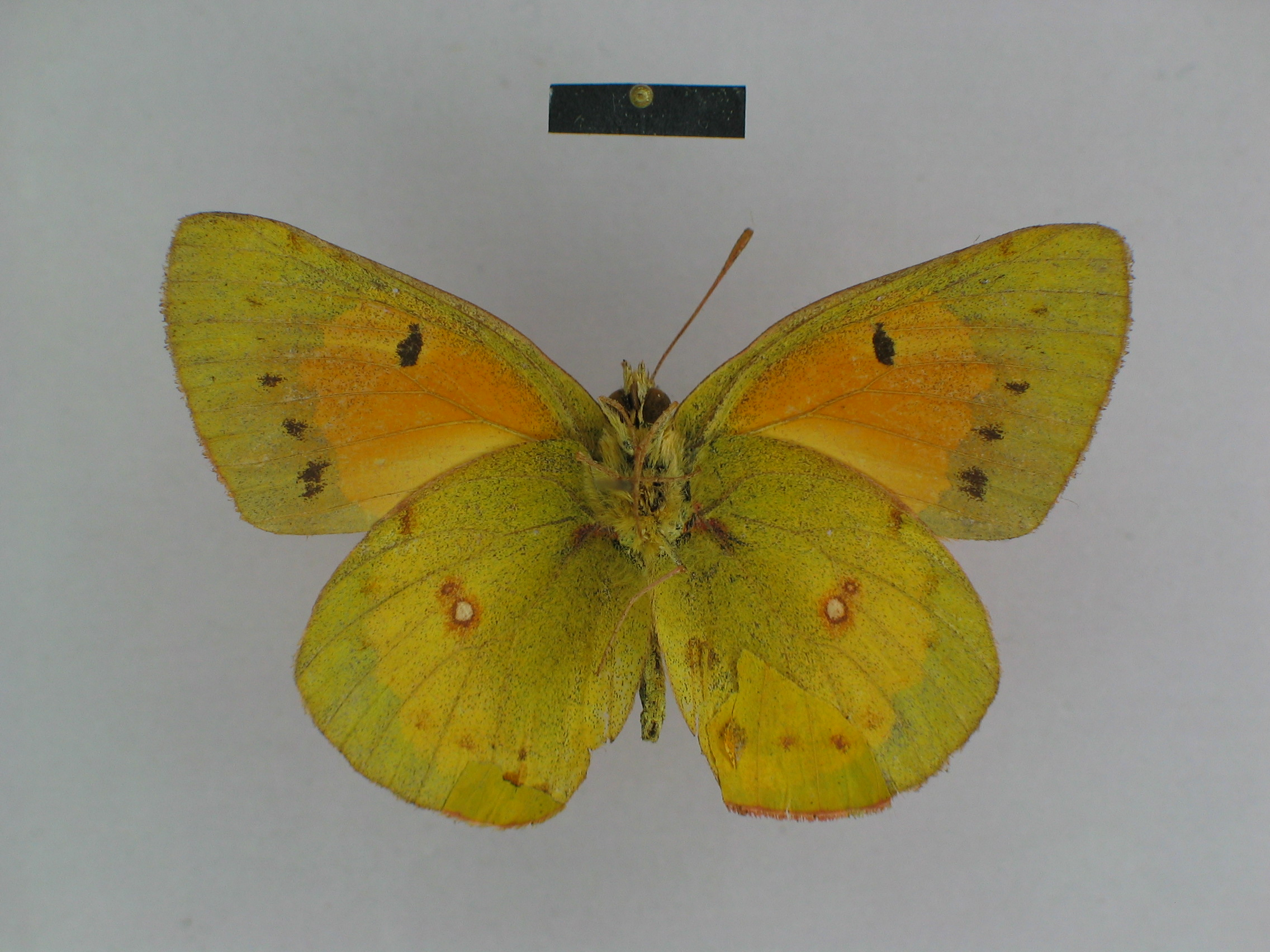
Ventral view (male)

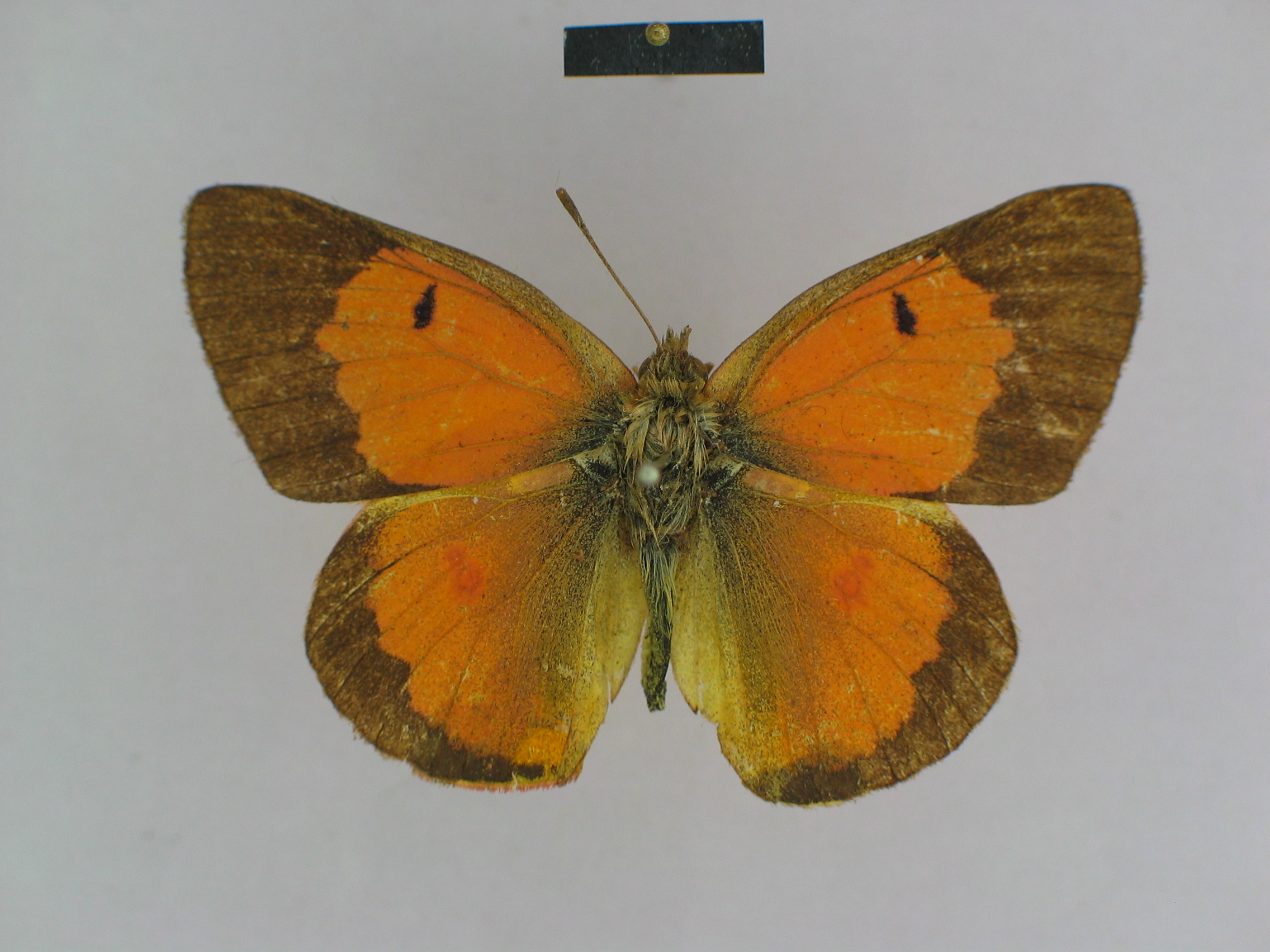
Dorsal view (male)

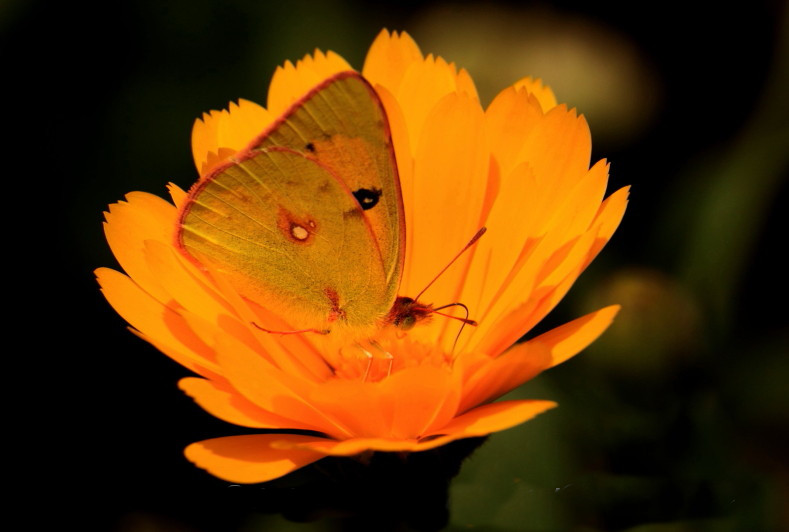
from South sikkim

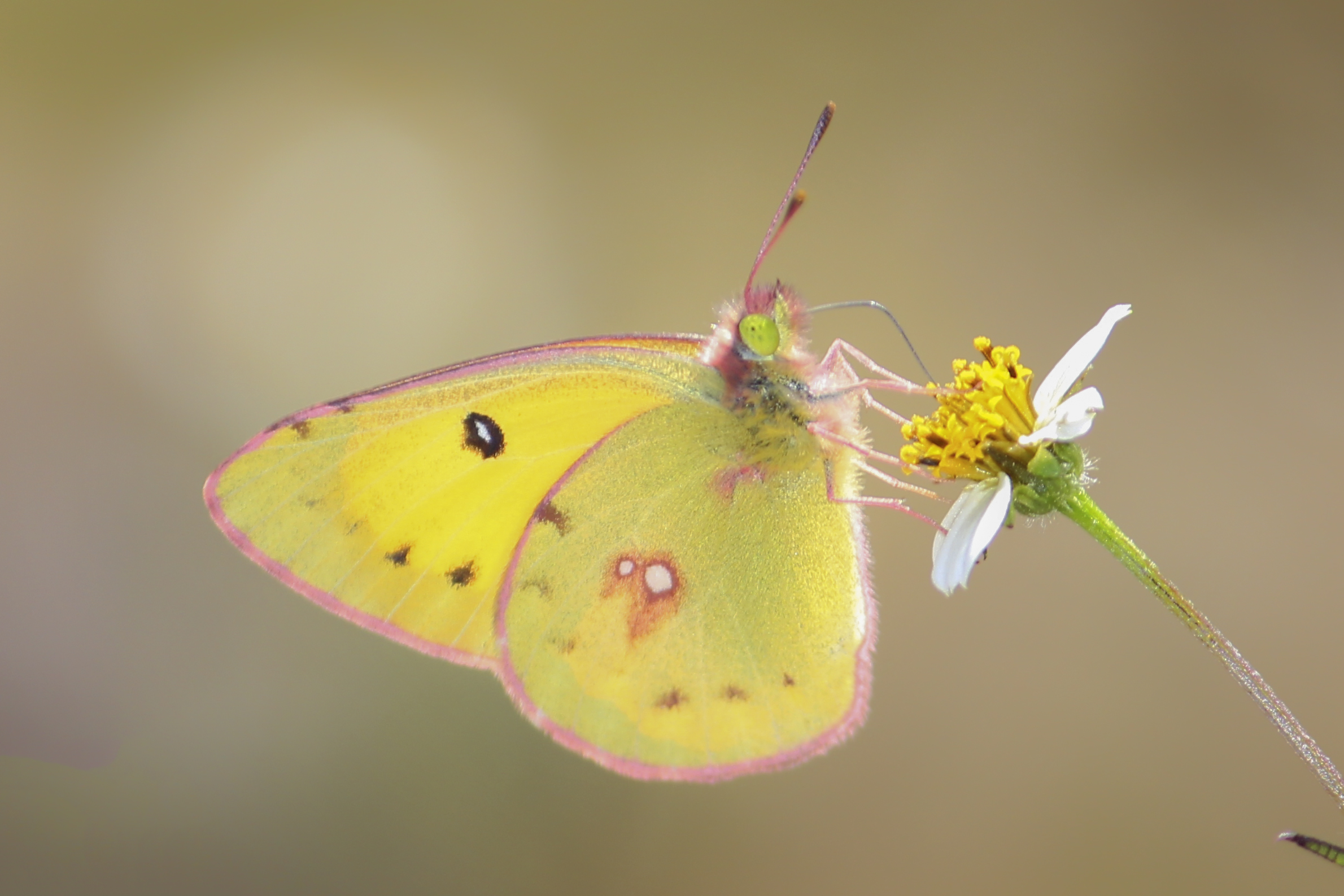
