= Chelela Pass =

Highest motorable point in Bhutan

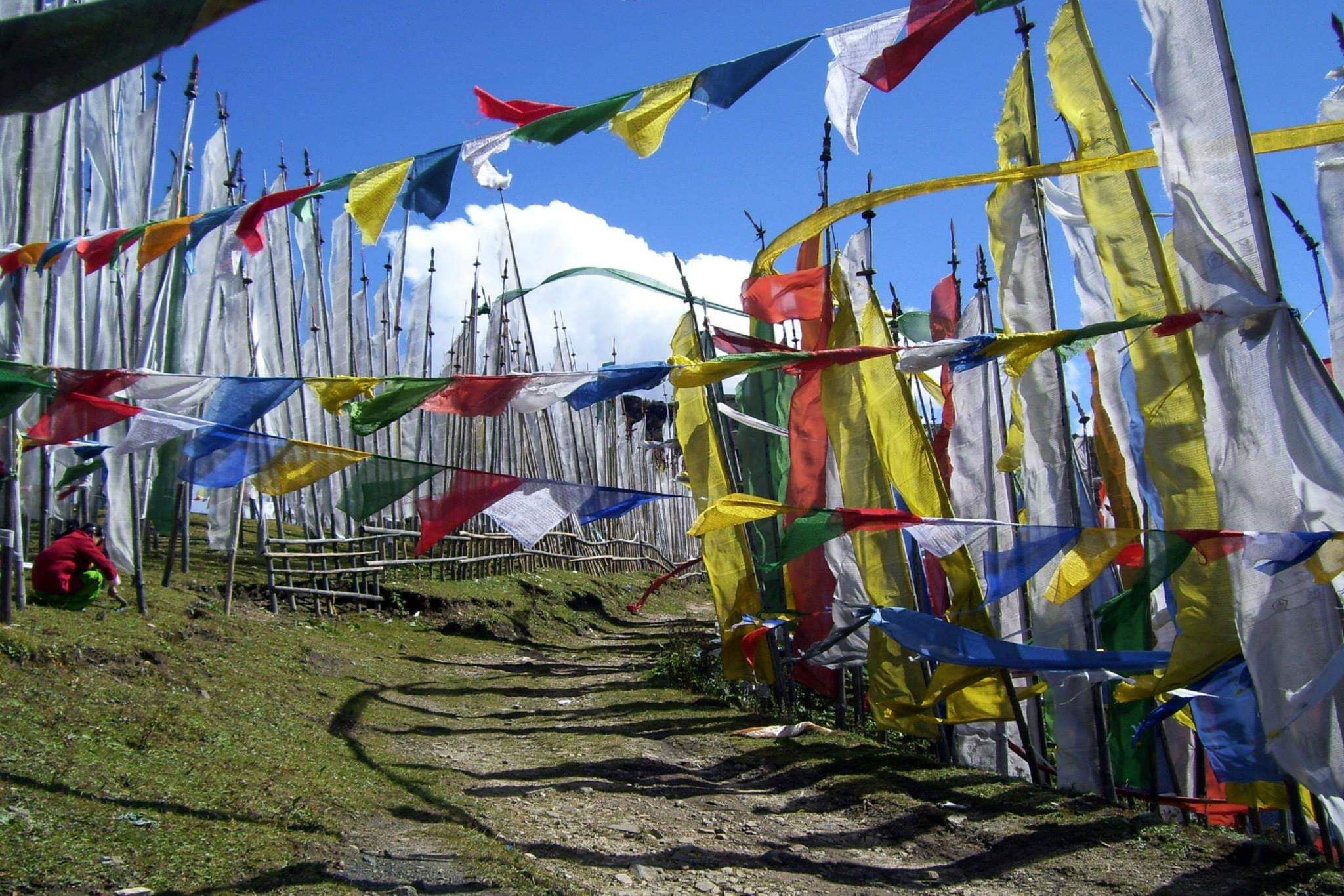
Prayer flags at the Pass

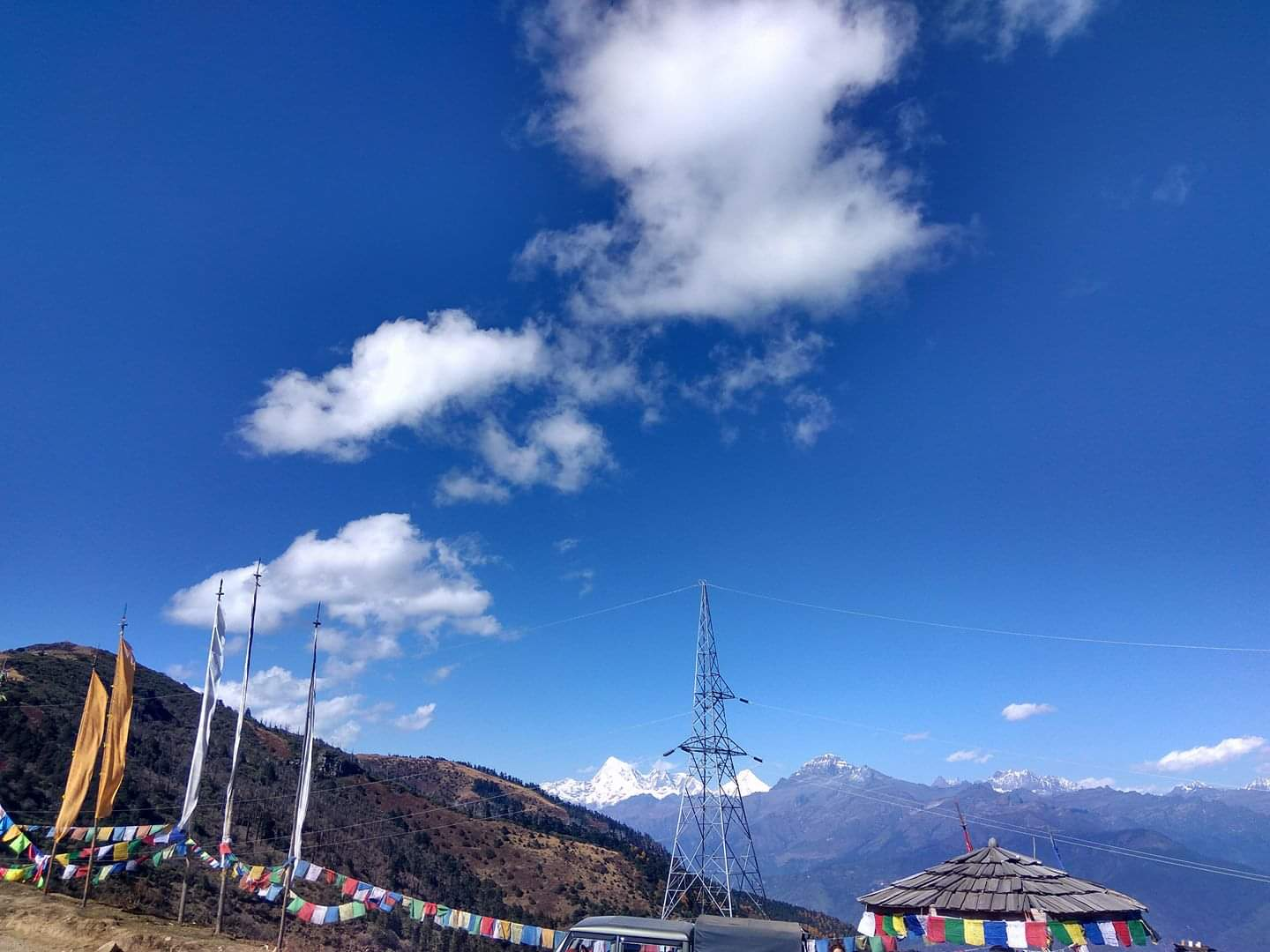
Chele La during summer season

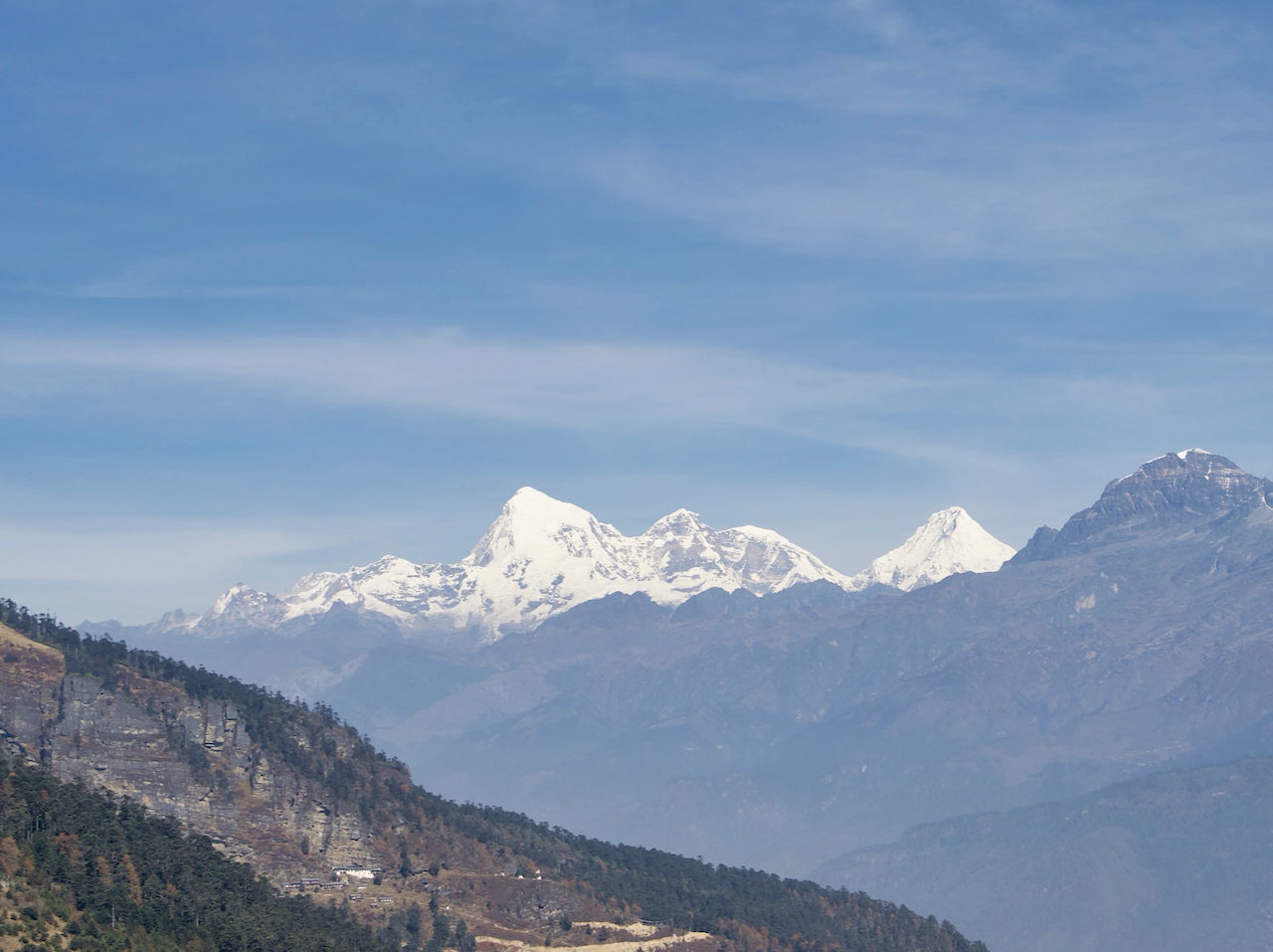
Mount Chomolhari (Jomolhari) as seen from Chele La

Chele La (Chele Pass, la means pass in Dzongkha) is the highest motorable point in Bhutan, sitting 3,988 metres (13,083 ft) above sea level, between the Haa and Paro valleys. The pass is located 35 km from Paro and 26 km from Haa on the Bondey-Haa Highway. Built in the 1990s, the asphalt road is narrow and steep, with sharp turns and sheer drops. It may be dangerous in winter due to snow and ice and the risk of avalanche.

An area just below the pass was used as the location for Agay's Hut in Khyentse Norbu's film Travellers & Magicians. The film crew rebuilt an abandoned camp once used by the Bhutan Logging Corporation, as their headquarters during filming, fortifying the buildings with corrugated steel sheets.

Chele La
| Elevation | 3,988 m (13,083 ft) |
| Location | Bondey-Haa Highway from Paro to Haa |
| Range | Himalayas |
| Coordinates | 27.36971°N 89.34731°E |
