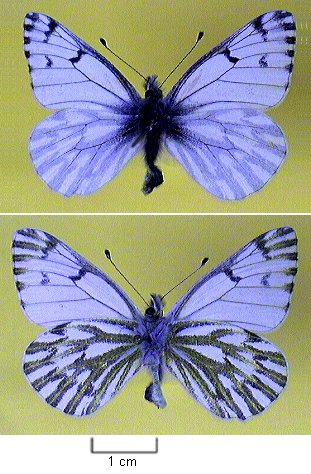

Conservation status
- Secure (NatureServe)

Scientific classification
- Kingdom: Animalia
- Phylum: Arthropoda
- Class: Insecta
- Order: Lepidoptera
- Family: Pieridae
- Genus: Pontia
- Species: P. sisymbrii

Binomial name
- Pontia sisymbrii (Boisduval, 1852)

Subspecies
- 5 subspecies, see text

Synonyms
- Pieris sisymbrii

= Pontia sisymbrii =

Spring white

Species of butterfly

Pontia sisymbrii, the spring white, California white, or Colorado white, is a butterfly in the family Pieridae. It is found in mountainous areas of western Canada and the United States.

It is mostly white with small black markings; females may be yellowish. Similar to other checkered whites such as, Pontia beckerii, Pontia protodice, and Pontia occidentalis.

The wingspan is 31 to 40 millimeters.

The host plants are in Brassicaceae (the mustard family) and include Caulanthus, Streptanthus, and Sisymbrium altissimum, Arabis glabra, Arabis furcata, and Arabis holboelli.

== Subspecies ==
Listed alphabetically.

- Pontia sisymbrii elivata (Barnes & Benjamin, 1926)
- Pontia sisymbrii flavitincta (Comstock, 1924)
- Pontia sisymbrii nigravenosa Austin & Emmel, ?2003
- Pontia sisymbrii sisymbrii
- Pontia sisymbrii transversa Holland, 1995
