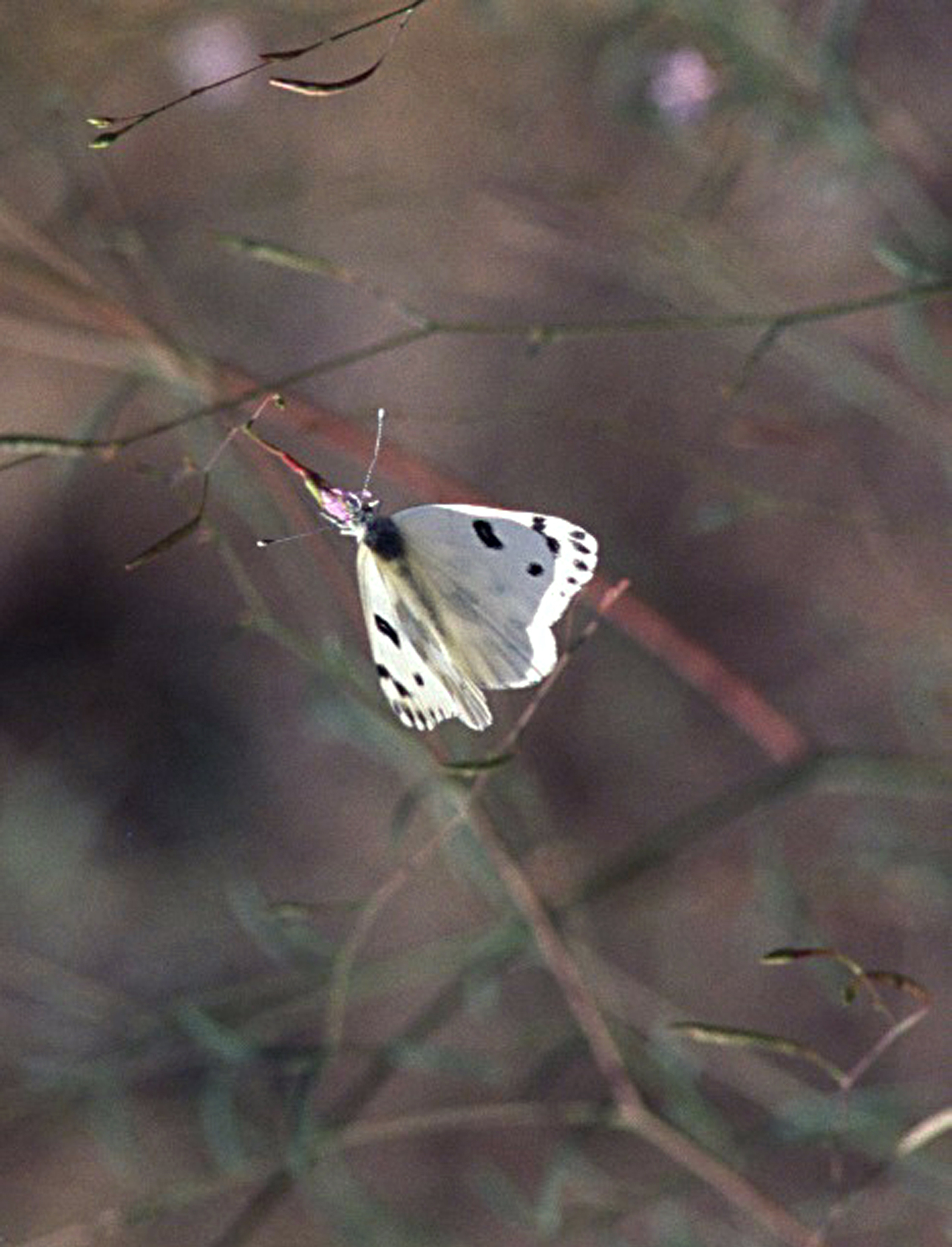

Conservation status
- Secure (NatureServe)

Scientific classification
- Kingdom: Animalia
- Phylum: Arthropoda
- Class: Insecta
- Order: Lepidoptera
- Family: Pieridae
- Genus: Pontia
- Species: P. beckerii

Binomial name
- Pontia beckerii (W.H. Edwards, 1871)

Synonyms
- Pieris beckerii; Pontieuchloia beckeri

= Pontia beckerii =

Species of butterfly

Pontia beckerii, the Becker's white, Great Basin white, or sagebrush white, is a butterfly in the family Pieridae. It is found in western North America from Baja California, Mexico to southern British Columbia, Canada.

It is mostly white with small black markings; females have more dark markings. The species is similar to other checkered whites such as, Pontia sisymbrii, Pontia protodice, and Pontia occidentalis.

The wingspan is 33 to 48 millimeters.

The host plants are Isomeris arborea, Stanleya pinnata, Brassica nigra, Descurainia pinnata, Sisymbrium altissimum, Sisymbrium linifolium (syn. Schoenocrambe linifolia), Lepidium perfoliatum, Thelypodium sagittatum, and Thelypodium laciniatum.
