= Whites (butterfly) =

The common name white or whites may refer to several butterflies:

- Pierinae, a subfamily commonly called the whites
- Pieris, a genus of Pierinae commonly called the whites or garden whites
- Appias, another genus of Pierinae sometimes called the whites
- Pontia, a third genus of Pierinae sometimes called the whites
