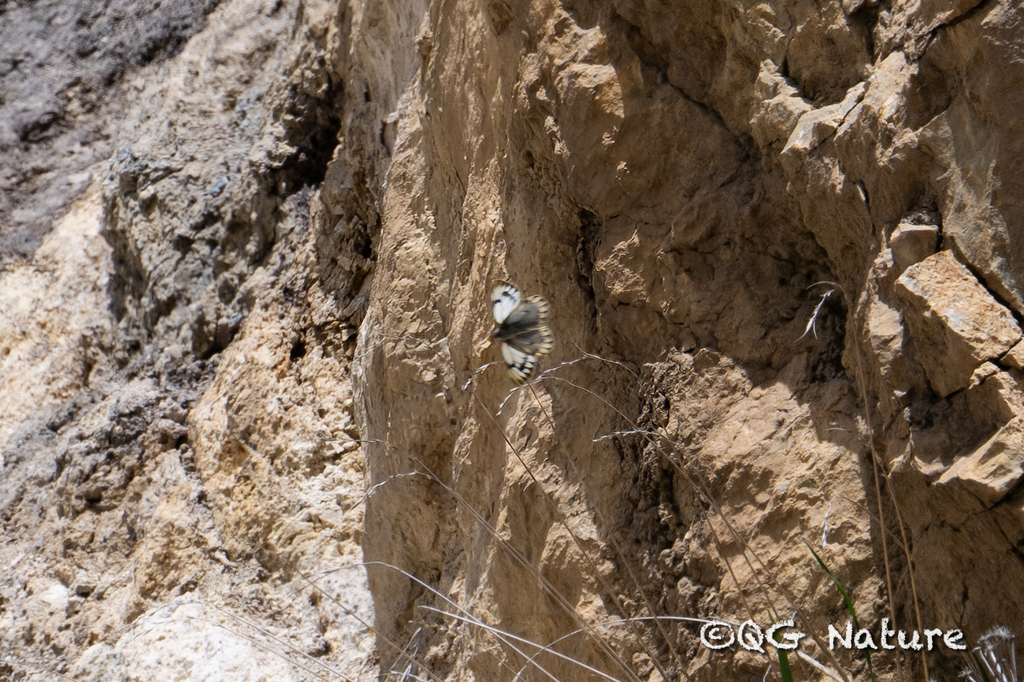

Scientific classification
- Kingdom: Animalia
- Phylum: Arthropoda
- Class: Insecta
- Order: Lepidoptera
- Family: Pieridae
- Genus: Sinopieris
- Species: S. dubernardi

Binomial name
- Sinopieris dubernardi (Oberthür, 1884)

Synonyms
- Pieris dubernardi Oberthür 1884; Parapieris chumbiensis de Nicéville (1897); Synchloe dubernardi O. Bang-Haas (1938); Pieris dubernardi var. kozlovi Alphéraky, 1897; Pieris dubernardi pomiensis Yoshino, 1998; Pieris dubernardi rothschildi Verity, 1911; Pieris dubernardi var. gyantsensis Verity, 1911; Pieris dubernardi pomiensis Yoshino, 1998; Synchloe dubernardi bromkampi O. Bang-Haas, 1938

= Sinopieris dubernardi =

Species of butterfly

Sinopieris dubernardi, or Oberthür's white, is a species of butterfly in the family Pieridae. It is treated as a member of the genus Sinopieris, or alternately, the genus Pontia. It is found in China, where it inhabits grassland plateaus and mountainsides at elevations above 2,000 meters.

== Subspecies ==
Sinopieris dubernardi has a number of subspecies:

- S. d. bromkampi (O. Bang-Haas, 1938) (China: Gansu)
- S. d. chumbiensis (de Nicéville, 1897) (southern Tibet)
- S. d. dubernardi (China: northern Yunnan, western Sichuan)
- S. d. gyantsenisis (Verity, 1911) (southern Tibet)
- S. d. kozlovi (Alphéraky, 1897) (China: Nanshan)
- S. d. pomiensis (Yoshino, 1998) (eastern Tibet)
- S. d. rothschildi (Verity, 1911) (China: Shaanxi)
- S. d. wangi Huang, 1998 (south-eastern Tibet)
