= Sinopieris dubernardi bromkampi =

Scientific classification
- Kingdom: Animalia
- Phylum: Arthropoda
- Class: Insecta
- Order: Lepidoptera
- Family: Pieridae
- Genus: Sinopieris
- Species: S. dubernardi
- Subspecies: S. d. bromkampi

Trinomial name
- Sinopieris dubernardi bromkampi (Bang-Haas, 1938)

Subspecies of butterfly

Snopieris dubernardi bromkampi is a subspecies of Sinopieris dubernardi, a butterfly in the genus Sinopieris. It was described by Otto Bang-Haas in 1938. It can be found in southeast Tibet.
