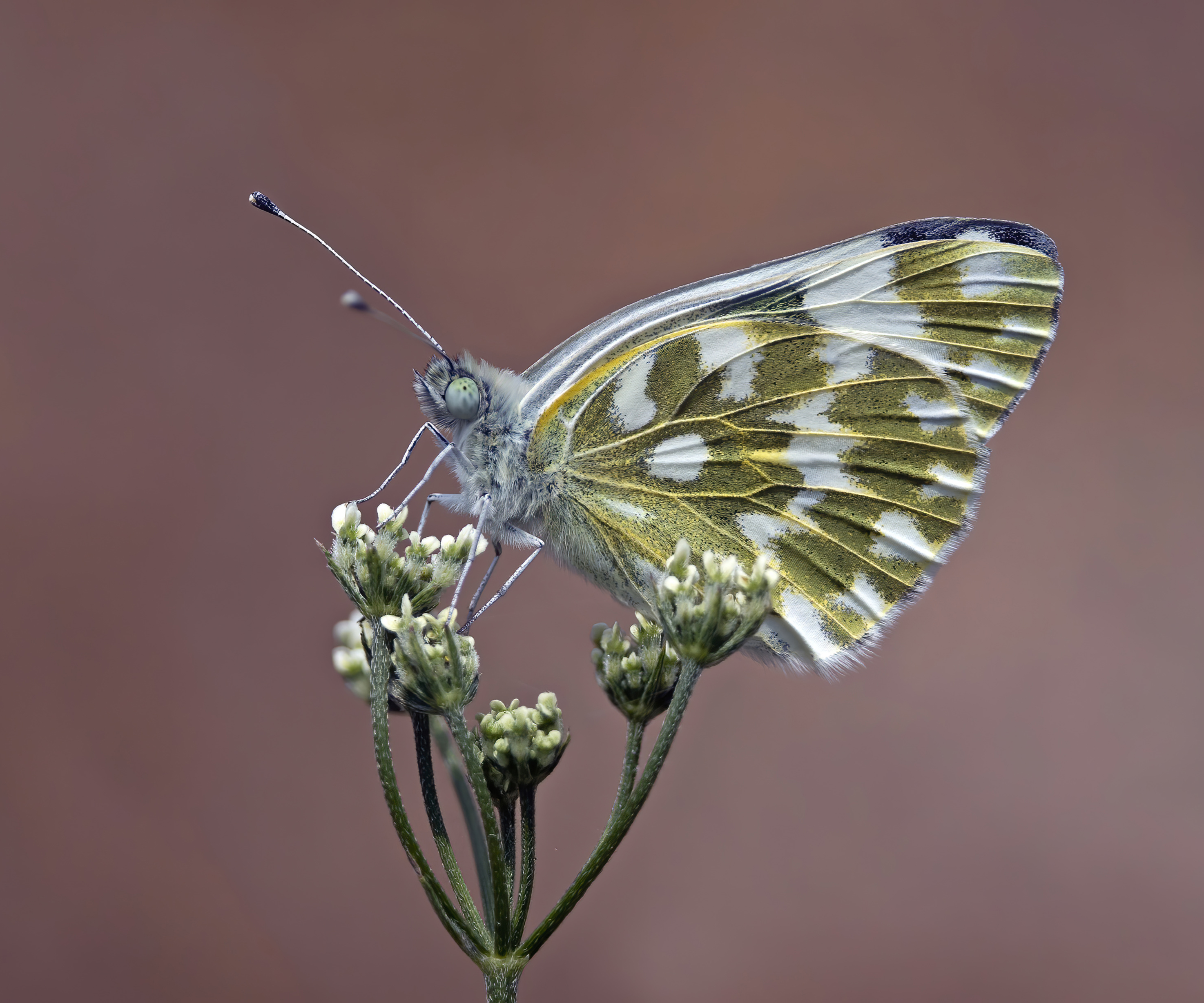
- Istria, Croatia

Scientific classification
- Kingdom: Animalia
- Phylum: Arthropoda
- Class: Insecta
- Order: Lepidoptera
- Family: Pieridae
- Genus: Pontia
- Species: P. edusa

Binomial name
- Pontia edusa Fabricius, 1777

Synonyms
- Colias edusa (Fabricius, 1787); Papilio edusa (Fabricius, 1787); Pontia daplidice auct. non (Linnaeus, 1758); Pontia daplidice edusa (Fabricius, 1776)

= Pontia edusa =

Eastern Bath white

Species of butterfly

Pontia edusa, the eastern Bath white, is a butterfly in the family Pieridae.

== Description ==
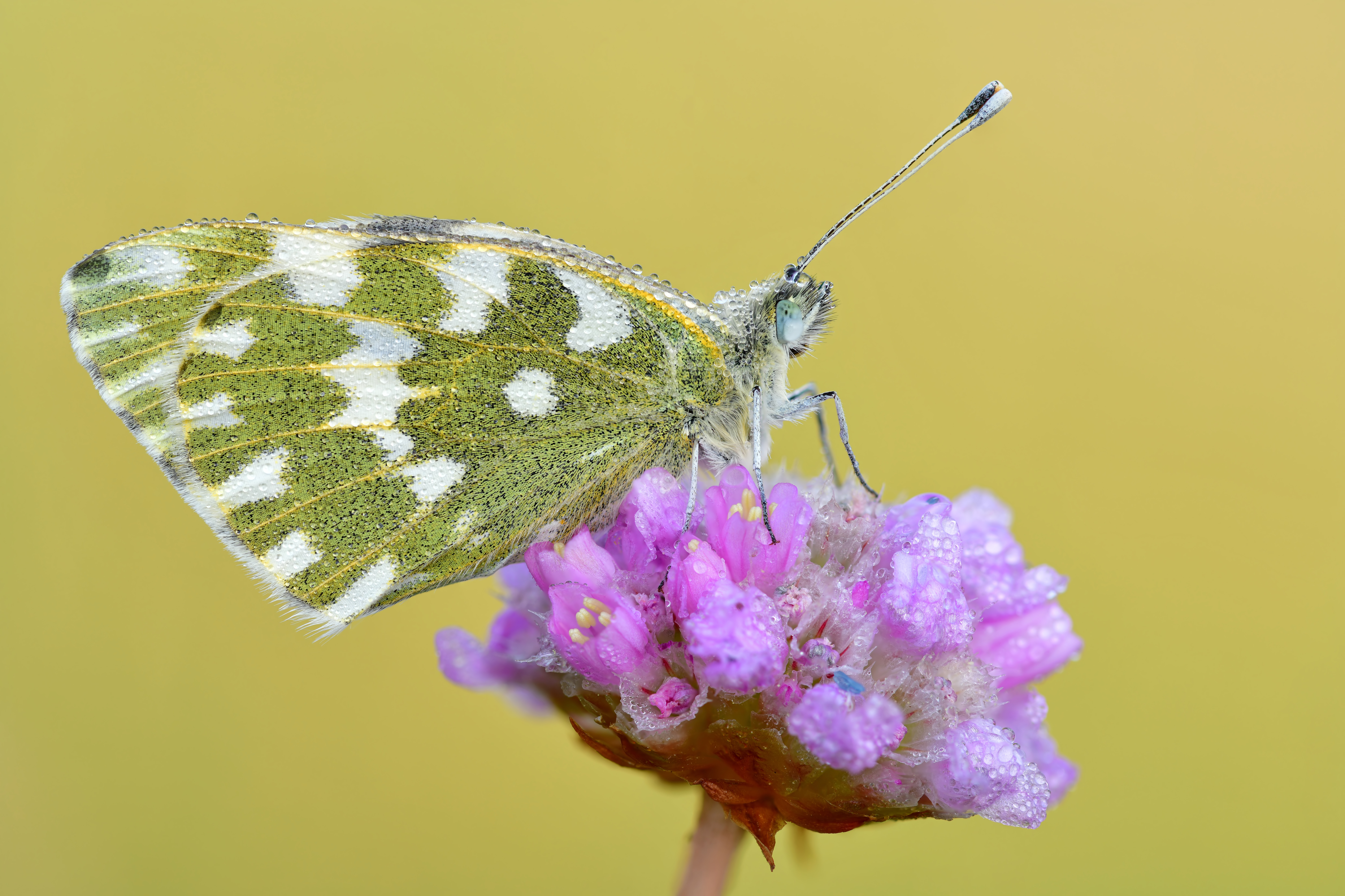
In the early morning

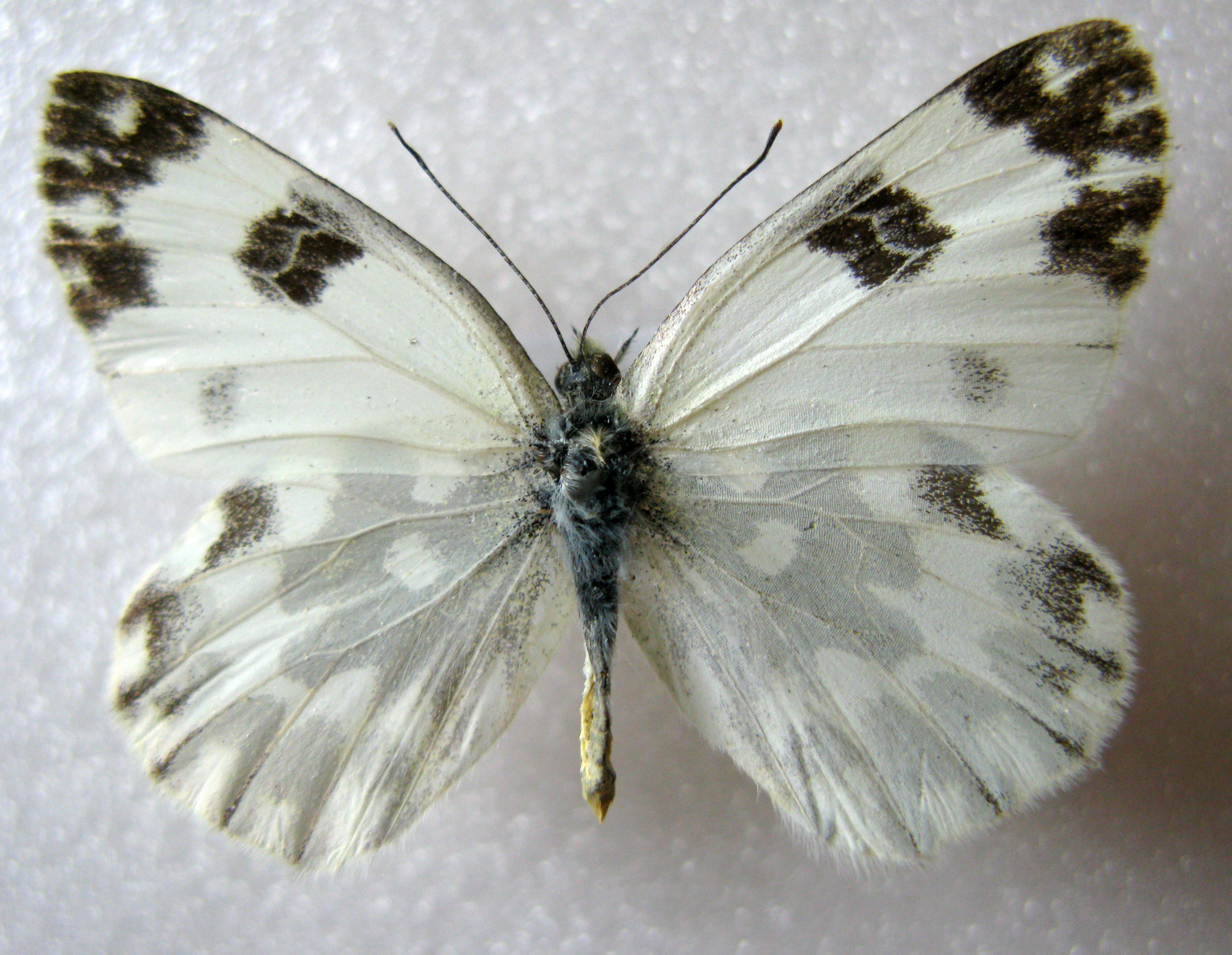
Pontia edusa male

Pontia edusa is a small to medium-sized migrant butterfly, with a wingspan reaching about 45 mm. The upperside of the wings is white, with black stains on the top of the forewing and hindwing. The hindwing undersides have greenish-grey spots. The butterfly is nearly identical to Pontia daplidice, making the western extent of its range difficult to ascertain. Investigations of the genitals and DNA analysis are the only way to distinguish between these two types.

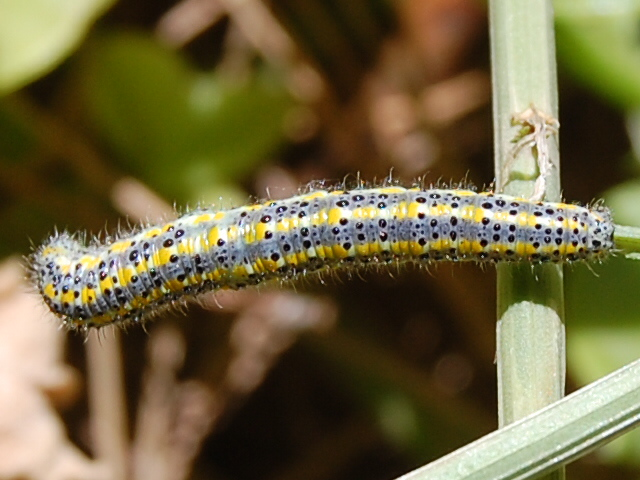
Caterpillar

The adults fly from March to October with two to four generations depending on the latitude. The eggs are laid singly and have an incubation period of seven days. The caterpillars are present from May. They are greyish-greenish, with black dots and broad yellow stripes, quite similar to the larva of the cabbage butterfly (Pieris brassicae). The larvae feed on Resedaceae species. Pontia edusa hibernates in the chrysalis stage.

== Distribution ==
It is found from the south east of Europe (southern France, Italy, Corsica, Sardinia) up to central Europe and the Middle East in Iran and Iraq. It is a migrant which can also be encountered in Belgium, Holland, northern Germany and Poland, in the Baltic states and in southern Sweden and Norway.

== Habitat ==
This species is found in any open grassy or flowery areas, in stony or rocky places and in roadsides, at altitudes up to 1,500 metres (4,900 ft) and occasionally higher. It is found especially where the host plants grow, at an altitude of 0–2,300 metres (0–7,546 ft).

== Subspecies ==
- P. e. edusa (Fabricius, 1777) (Finland and north east and south east Central Europe, Italy, Turkey, the Caucasus, Ukraine, Russia)
- P. e. persica (Bienert, 1869) (Iran, Afghanistan)
- P. e. nubicola (Fruhstorfer, 1908) (Turkestan)
- P. e. amphimara (Fruhstorfer, 1908) (China (Szetschwan), Yunnan)
- P. e. praeclara (Fruhstorfer, 1910) (south west China)
- P. e. moorei (Röber, 1907) (Kashmir, Baluchistan, Tibet, Yunnan, south east China, Thailand)
- P. e. avidia (Fruhstorfer, 1908) (southern China, ? Korea)
- P. e. davendra (Hemming, 1934) (Siberia (Ussuri))
