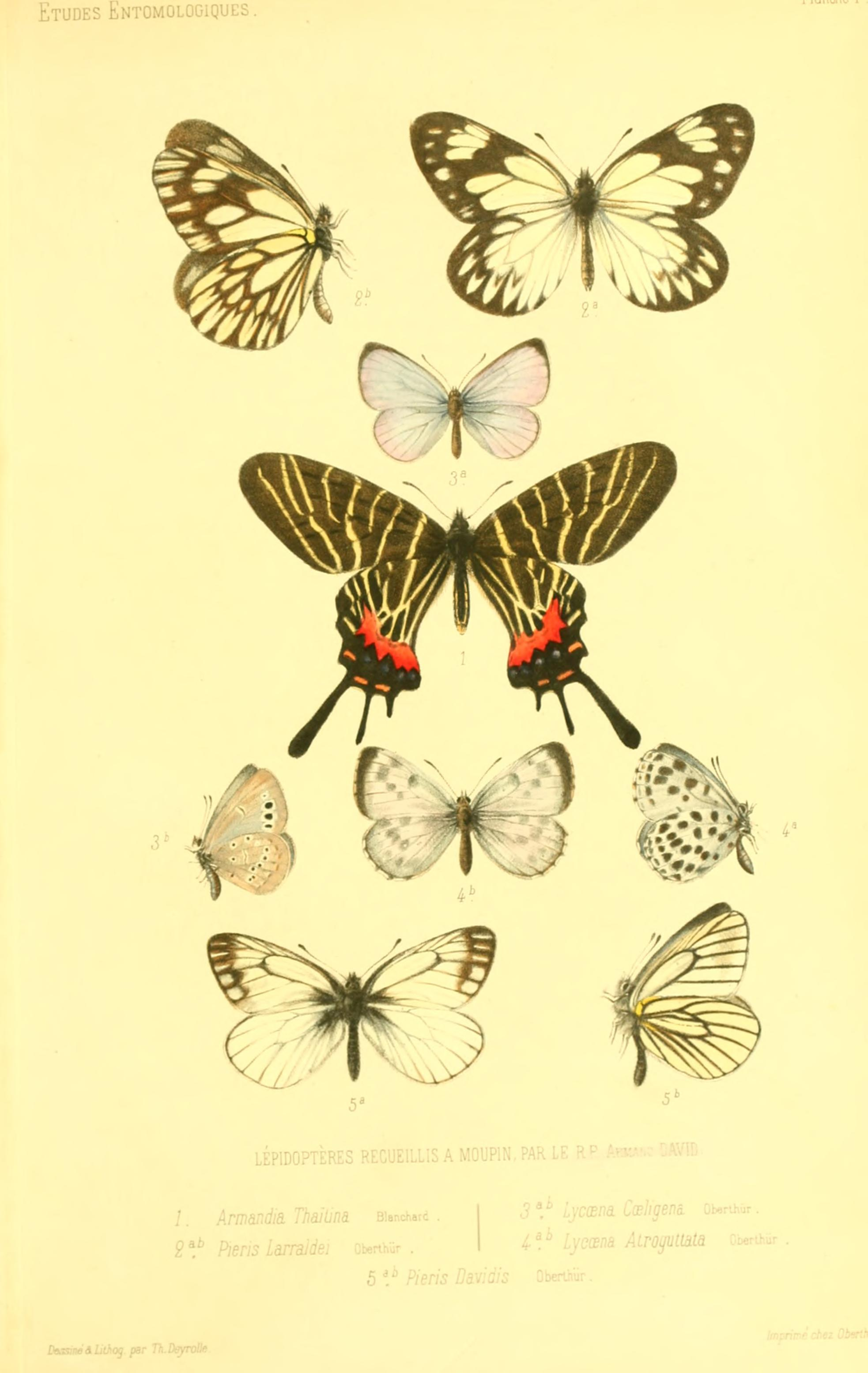

Scientific classification
- Kingdom: Animalia
- Phylum: Arthropoda
- Class: Insecta
- Order: Lepidoptera
- Family: Pieridae
- Genus: Sinopieris
- Species: S. davidis

Binomial name
- Sinopieris davidis (Oberthür 1876)

Synonyms
- Pieris davidis Oberthür, 1876; Pieris davidina Oberthür 1891; Pieris thibetana Verity 1907; Pieris davidis diluta Verity, 1911; Pontia davidis (Oberthür 1876)

= Sinopieris davidis =

Species of butterfly

Sinopieris davidis is a species of butterfly in the genus Sinopieris, but also possibly in Pontia. It was described by Charles Oberthür in 1876 and is found in China.

== Subspecies ==
- Sinopieris davidis davidis (Yunnan, Sichuan)
- Sinopieris davidis diluta (Verity, 1911) (Shaanxi)
- Sinopieris davidis thibetana (Verity 1907) (Tibet)
