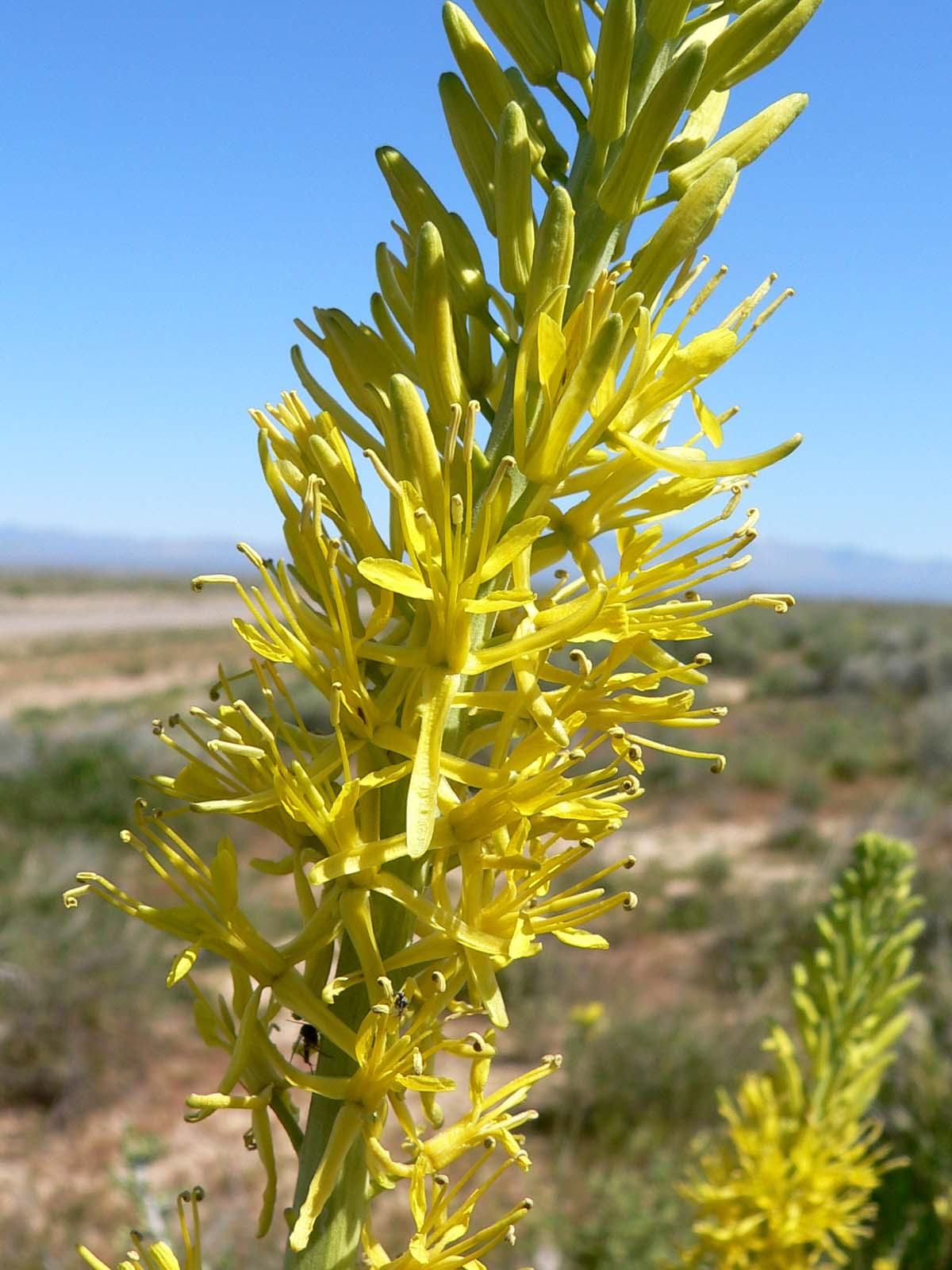

Conservation status
- Secure (NatureServe)

Scientific classification
- Kingdom: Plantae
- Clade: Tracheophytes
- Clade: Angiosperms
- Clade: Eudicots
- Clade: Rosids
- Order: Brassicales
- Family: Brassicaceae
- Genus: Stanleya
- Species: S. pinnata

Binomial name
- Stanleya pinnata (Pursh) Britton

= Stanleya pinnata =

Species of flowering plant

Stanleya pinnata is a species of flowering plant in the family Brassicaceae known as desert prince's-plume. It is a perennial herb or shrub native to North America.

== Distribution ==
The plant is native to the western Great Plains and western North America. It occurs in many types of open habitat, including deserts, chaparral, foothills, rocky cliffs, sagebrush, and prairie. It prefers alkali- and gypsum-rich soils.

== Description ==
Stanleya pinnata is a perennial herb or shrub producing several erect stems reaching up to about 1.5 metres (4 11/12 ft) in maximum height. The stems are unbranched, hairless, often waxy in texture, and have woody bases. The leaves have fleshy blades up to 15 centimetres (5.9 in) long by 5 centimetres (2.0 in) wide which are divided into several long, narrow lobes. The blades are borne on petioles.

The top of the stem is occupied by a long inflorescence which is a dense raceme of many flowers. Each flower has four narrow yellowish sepals which open to reveal four bright yellow petals each up to 2 centimetres (0.79 in) long. The stamens protruding from the flower's center may approach 3 cm in length.

The fruit is a curving, wormlike silique up to 8 centimetres (3.1 in) long.

== Uses ==
It has been used as a Native American traditional medicinal plant and food source, including by the Hopi, Zuni, Paiute, Navajo, Kawaiisu, and Tewa peoples.

== Ecology ==
It is a larval host to both Becker's white and checkered white caterpillars.

Some of the plant's amino acids use selenium from the soil in place of sulfur, making it highly toxic to animals.
