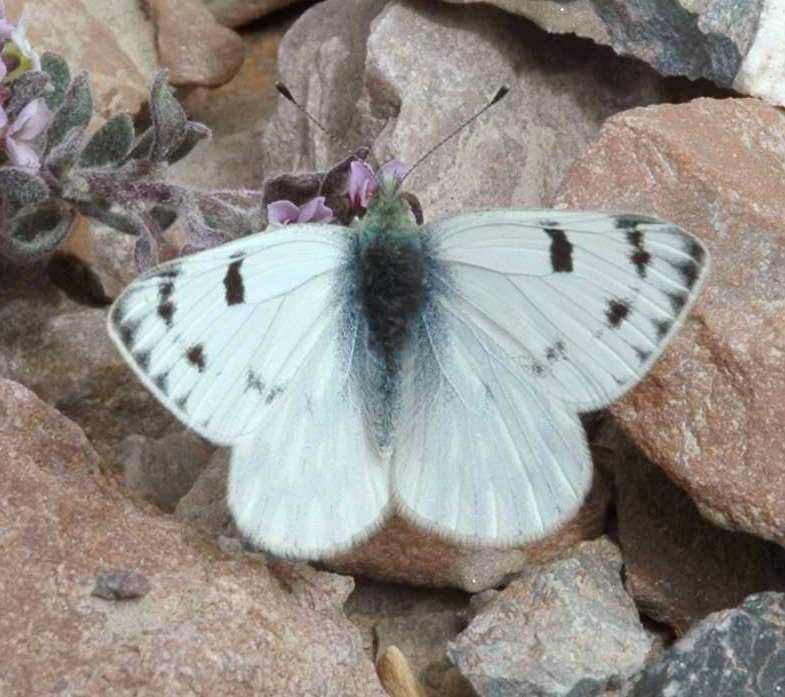
- P. c. kalora at Chandratal Lake (14,000 feet (4,300 m)), near Manali, India

Scientific classification
- Domain: Eukaryota
- Kingdom: Animalia
- Phylum: Arthropoda
- Class: Insecta
- Order: Lepidoptera
- Family: Pieridae
- Genus: Pontia
- Species: P. callidice

Binomial name
- Pontia callidice Hübner 1799-1800

Synonyms
- Synchloe callidice

= Pontia callidice =

Lofty Bath white

Species of butterfly

Pontia callidice, the lofty Bath white or peak white, is a small butterfly of the yellows and whites family (Pieridae), which occurs in the Palearctic realm.

== Description ==
Description from Charles Thomas Bingham's (1907) The Fauna of British India, Including Ceylon and Burma, Butterflies, Volume II, pp 178–179. Pieris callidice
(=Pieris kalora, Moore, P.Z.S. 1865:449)

=== Male ===
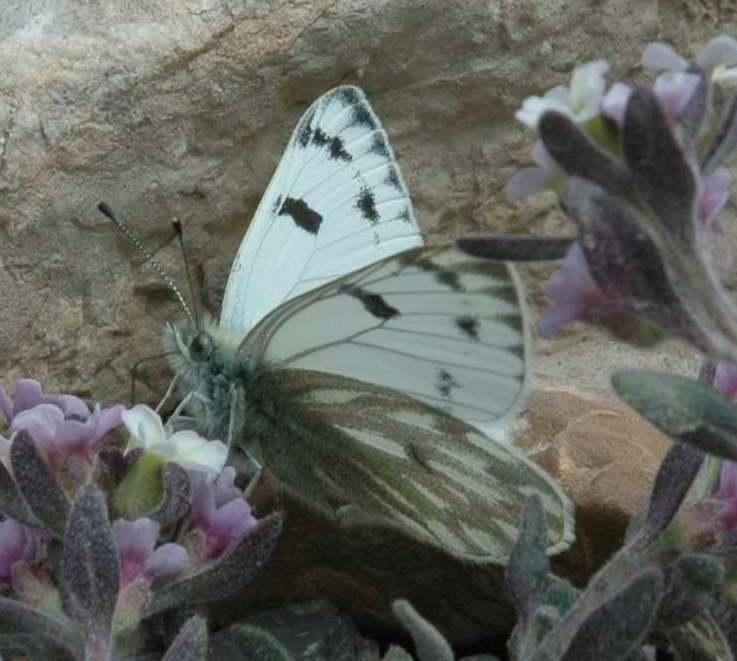
Indian lofty Bath white (P. c. kalora)

- Upperside: white
  - Forewing: black at extreme bases of interspaces 1a and 1 and of cell; discocellulars marked with a quadrate black spot; a discal curved series of inwardly dentate spots, the spots in interspaces 1 and 2 generally reduced to a mere trace, often absent; an anterior terminal series of similar but more clearly defined spots at the apices of veins 3 to 7.
  - Hindwing: uniform, the pattern of the underside visible through transparency; base densely irrorated (sprinkled) with black scales.
- Underside
  - Forewing: white; basal half of costal margin and quadrate spot on discocellulars dull black; a discal curved series of four black spots in interspaces 1, 3, 5 and 6, followed by elongate streaks of green along veins 3 to 7 that extend to the termen.
  - Hindwing: green, an elongate oval yellowish-white spot in cell, followed beyond by complete curved series of discal and terminal yellowish-white, inwardly lanceolate spots. Antennae black, spotted with white, head fuscous grey, thorax blackish grey, abdomen black with more or less sparse white scaling; beneath: head, thorax and abdomen white.

=== Female ===
- Upperside Similar to that of the male, the black scaling at the base of the wings more extended, especially on the hindwing where it stretches broadly down the dorsal half of the wing and occupies also the apex of the cell.
  - Forewing: the irroration of black scales along the basal half of the costal margin and discocellular quadrate black spot as in the male, the latter, however, broader; the apex and terminal third of the wing above vein 2 dusky black, with a series of elongate white spots in the interspaces, the inner margin of the black area curved but very jagged; lastly, a geminate (paired) transverse black spot in the outer half of interspace 1.
  - Hindwing: a terminal series of large, inwardly acute pointed, black spots with oval white centres and a large costal black spot before the apex.
- Underside
  - Forewing: the ground colour and markings are much as in the male, but the green on the apex and termen are more extended, the white streaks that traverse it are longer; the black discal spots in interspaces 5 and 6 are absent.
  - Hindwing: similar to that of the male, but the yellowish-white lanceolate spots narrower and smaller. Antennae, head, thorax and abdomen as in the male. In both sexes the antennae are not generally typical, the club abrupt, shorter, and broader.

Wingspan: 53–60 mm.

== Range ==
Within India, it occurs in the north-western Himalayas above 12,000 feet (3,700 m) from Chitral to Mussoorie. It also occurs in the higher mountains of Europe, in Asia from the Altai to the Himalayas, and in China. (Bingham, 1907)

== Habitat ==
It lives at high altitude in alpine meadows, above the tree line.

== See also ==
- List of butterflies of India
- List of butterflies of India (Pieridae)
