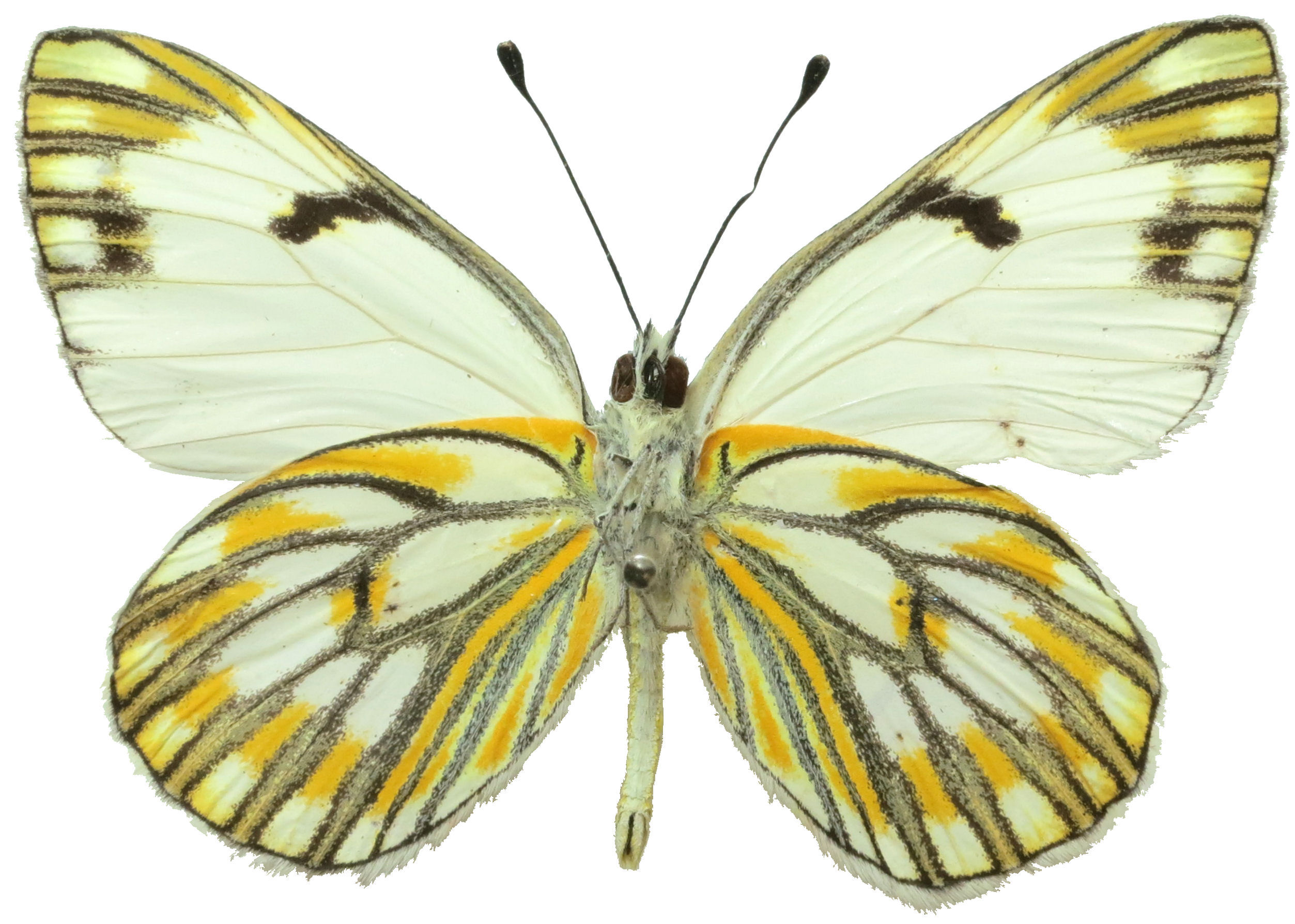
- Pontia helice johnstonii - Taita Hills, Kenya

Scientific classification
- Kingdom: Animalia
- Phylum: Arthropoda
- Class: Insecta
- Order: Lepidoptera
- Family: Pieridae
- Genus: Pontia
- Species: P. helice

Binomial name
- Pontia helice (Linnaeus, 1764)

Subspecies
- P. h. helice; P. h. johnstonii (Crowley, 1887)

Synonyms
- Papilio helice Linnaeus, 1764; Papilio hellica Linnaeus, 1767; Papilio raphani Esper, 1783; Synchloe johnstonii Crowley, 1887

= Pontia helice =

Meadow white

Species of butterfly

Pontia helice, the meadow white, is a butterfly in the family Pieridae. It is found in southern Africa.

Wingspan is 35–40 mm in males and 37–43 mm in females. Flight period is year-round.

The larvae feed on Heliophila species, Lobularia maritima, Lepidum capense, Rapistrum rugosum, and Reseda odorata.

== Subspecies ==
- P. h. helice (Mozambique, Zimbabwe, southern Botswana, southern Namibia, South Africa, Eswatini, Lesotho)
- P. h. johnstonii (Crowley, 1887) (Uganda, Kenya, Tanzania, Rwanda, Burundi, Democratic Republic of the Congo)
