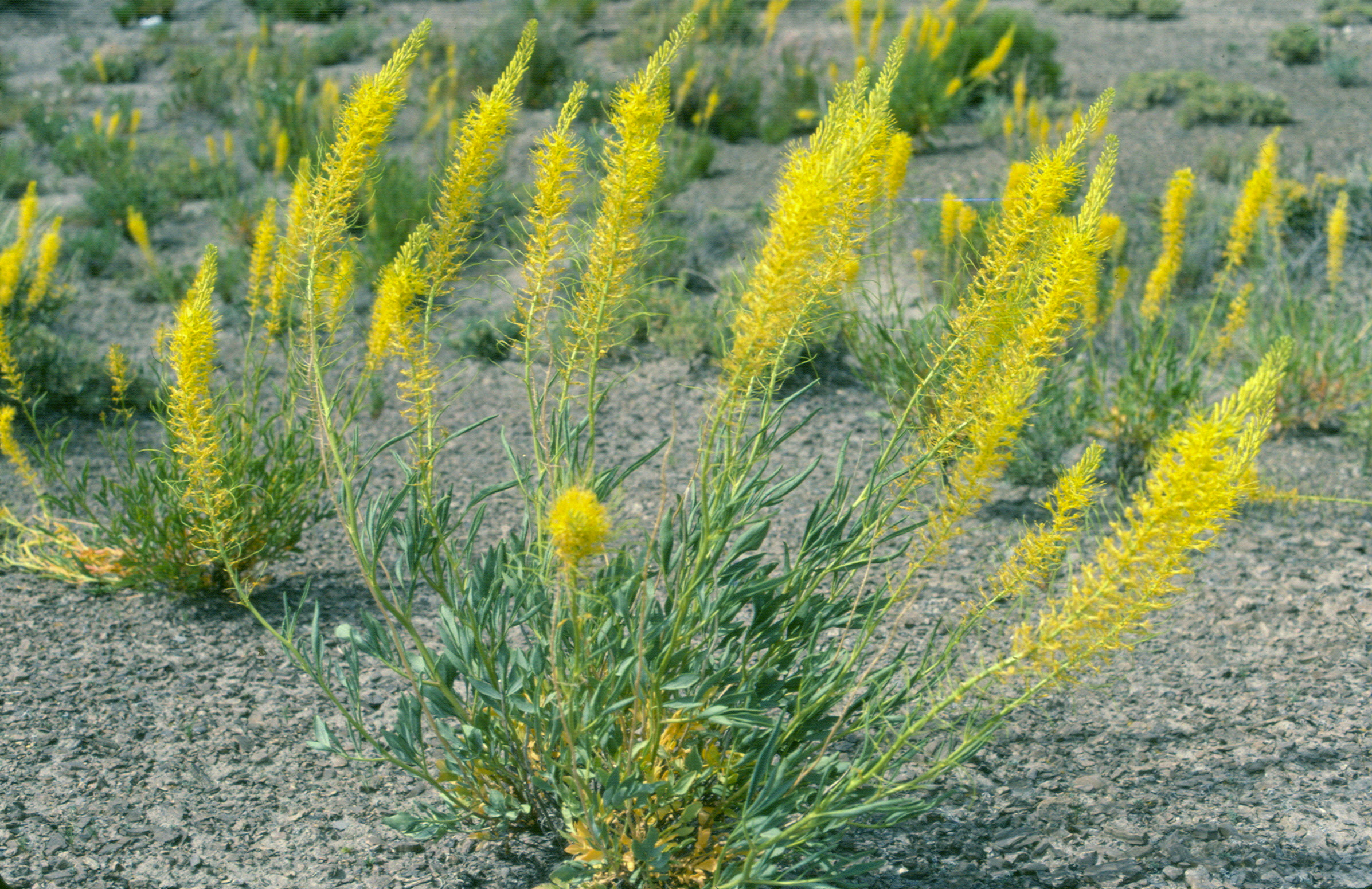
- Stanleya pinnata

Scientific classification
- Kingdom: Plantae
- Clade: Tracheophytes
- Clade: Angiosperms
- Clade: Eudicots
- Clade: Rosids
- Order: Brassicales
- Family: Brassicaceae
- Genus: Stanleya; Nutt.

Species
- 7 - See text

Synonyms
- Podolobus Raf.

= Stanleya (plant) =

Family of shrubs

Stanleya is a genus of flowering plants in the family Brassicaceae known commonly as prince's plumes. It includes seven species native to the western and central United States and northern Mexico. These are herbs or erect shrubs which bear dense, plumelike inflorescences of white to bright yellow flowers with long stamens. Stanleya species are native to the western United States. These plants are toxic because they concentrate selenium from the soil in their tissues.

== Species ==
Seven species are accepted.

- Stanleya albescens M.E.Jones – white prince's plume
- Stanleya bipinnata Greene
- Stanleya confertiflora (B.L.Rob.) Howell – Oregon prince's plume
- Stanleya elata M.E.Jones – Panamint prince's plume
- Stanleya pinnata (Pursh) Britton – desert prince's plume
- Stanleya tomentosa Parry – woolly prince's plume
- Stanleya viridiflora Nutt. – green prince's plume
