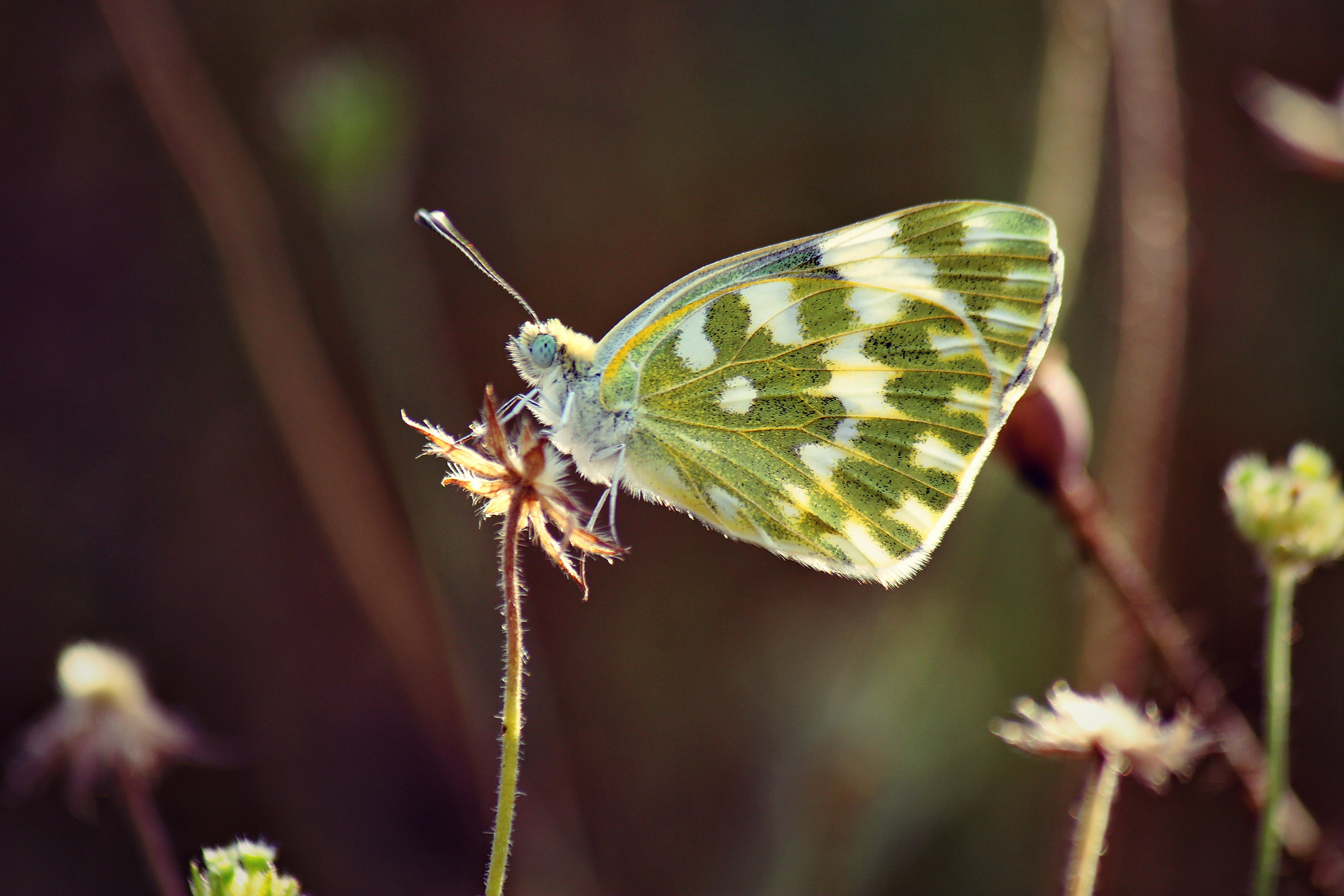

Scientific classification
- Domain: Eukaryota
- Kingdom: Animalia
- Phylum: Arthropoda
- Class: Insecta
- Order: Lepidoptera
- Family: Pieridae
- Genus: Pontia
- Species: P. chloridice

Binomial name
- Pontia chloridice (Hübner, 1813)

= Pontia chloridice =

Lesser Bath white

Species of butterfly

Pontia chloridice, the lesser Bath white, is a small butterfly of the family Pieridae, that is, the yellows and whites. The species is found in steppe zone of Ukraine, Moldova and Russia; east to Transbaikalia, Mongolia, Korea; south to Balkan Peninsula, Turkey, Transcaucasia, Greater Caucasus, Iran, Northern Pakistan, Central Asia (including Chitral and Ladakh in Kashmir), Kazakhstan.

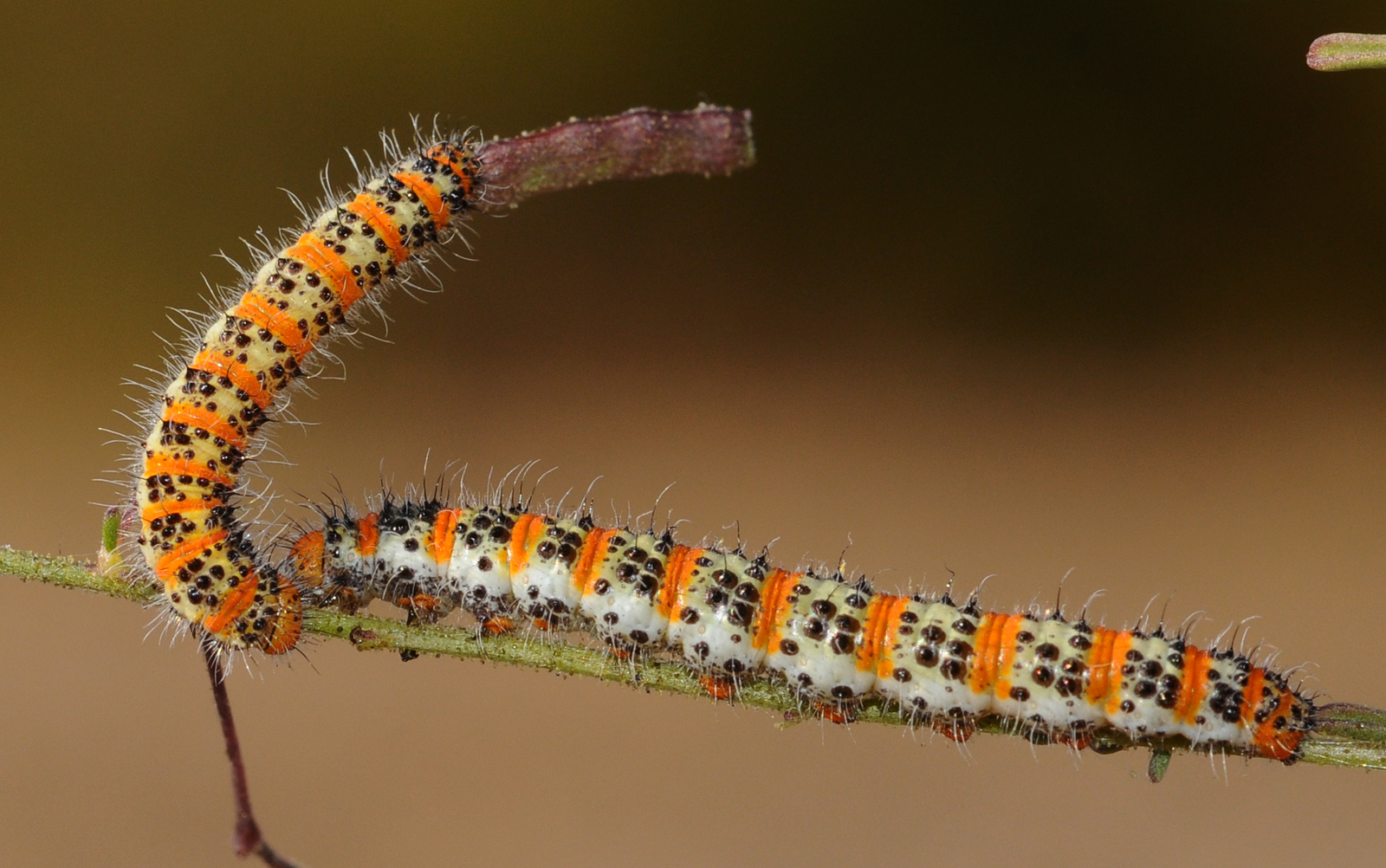
Larva

== Description ==
Male upperside ground colour white. The forewing has the discocellulars edged broadly with black on each side; a short broad transverse preapical black bar from costa to vein 6 and another similar short bar further outwards from vein 6 to middle of interspace 4, followed by three outwardly-pointed, somewhat oval, black terminal spots just below the apex. Hindwing: uniform, unmarked. Underside: white. Forewing: the markings as on the upperside, but those at apex green and with a few scattered superposed black scales on the upper preapical bar. Hindwing: basal area green, an oval white spot in middle of cell, a transverse white bar in middle of interspace 7, and the precostal area edged with white above; beyond the cell is a highly sinuous, curved, discal, white band, followed by a complete series of longitudinally rectangular, white, terminal spots, the space between the discal band and the white spots green, this colour continued along the veins that separate the spots up to the termen. Antennae, head, thorax and abdomen fuscous, the antennae with pale tips, the thorax with some white hairs; beneath: head, thorax and abdomen whitish.

Female differs as follows: Upperside, forewing: the black edging to the discocellulars broader; a curved, postdiscal, irregular, macular, black band, the upper three and lowest spot that compose it large, the spot in inter-space 2 small, sometimes subobsolete, the middle two spots of the band coalescent outwardly with the series of terminal black spots, of which there are six (in the male these vary from 3 to 5). Hindwing: an anterior, postdiscal, short, curved, macular, black band, often subobsolete, followed by a more or less complete terminal series of spots at the apices of the veins. Underside: as in the male; also the antennae, head, thorax and abdomen.

== See also ==
- List of butterflies of India
- List of butterflies of India (Pieridae)
