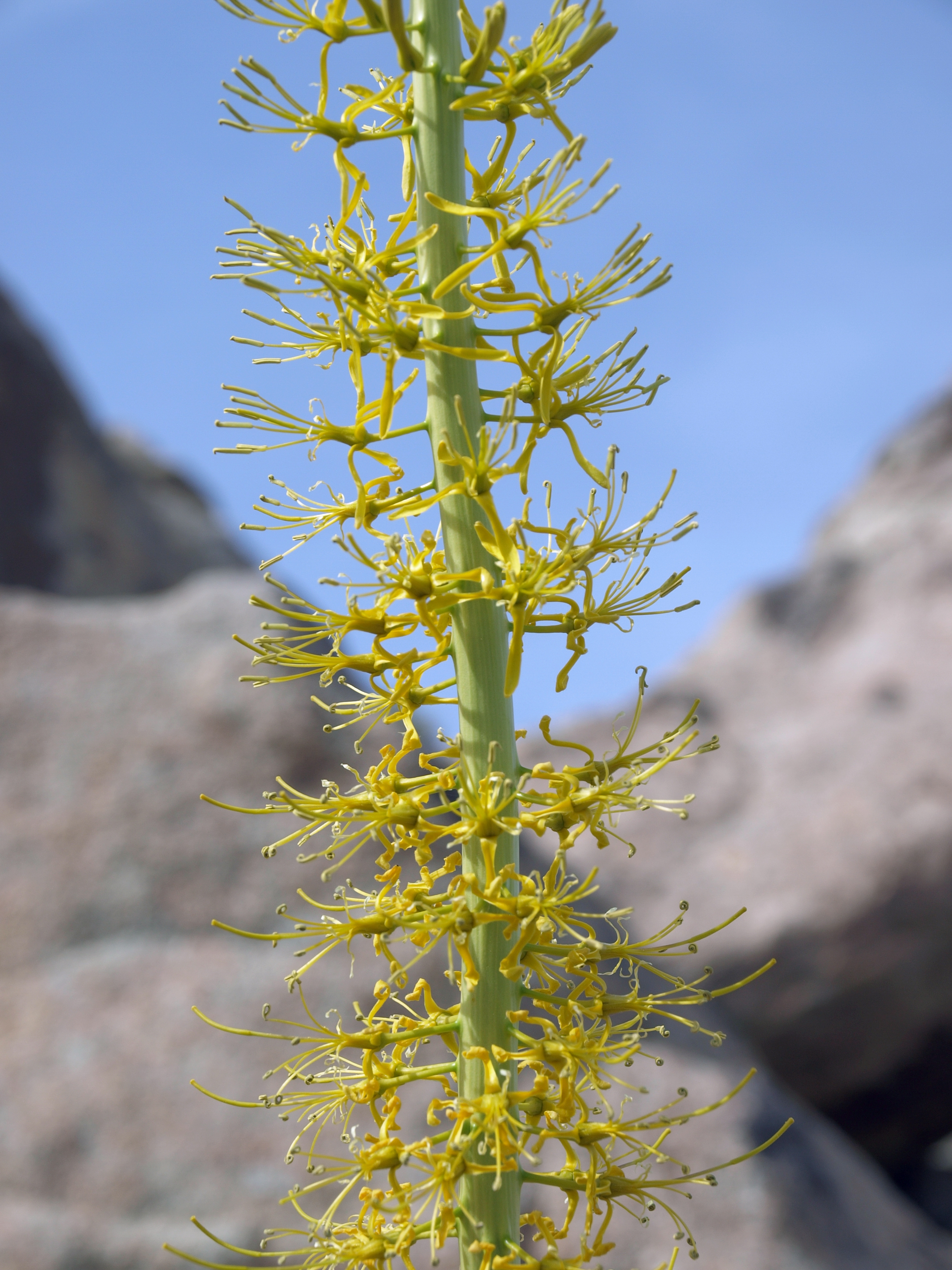

Scientific classification
- Kingdom: Plantae
- Clade: Tracheophytes
- Clade: Angiosperms
- Clade: Eudicots
- Clade: Rosids
- Order: Brassicales
- Family: Brassicaceae
- Genus: Stanleya
- Species: S. elata

Binomial name
- Stanleya elata M.E.Jones

= Stanleya elata =

Species of flowering plant

Stanleya elata is a species of flowering plant in the family Brassicaceae known by the common name Panamint princesplume. It is native to the desert mountains of eastern California and western Nevada, where it grows in rocky and scrubby habitat types. It may also occur in Arizona. It is a perennial herb producing one or more erect stems reaching about 1.5 meters in maximum height. They are hairless and often waxy in texture. The thick, leathery leaves have lance-shaped or oblong blades with smooth or toothed edges measuring up to 15 centimeters long. They are borne on petioles. The top of the stem is occupied by a long inflorescence which is a dense, snaking raceme of many flowers. Each flower has four narrow, threadlike yellow or whitish petals each about a centimeter long and a millimeter wide. The fruit is a long, thin, wormlike silique which may be 10 centimeters in length. It contains tiny seeds.
