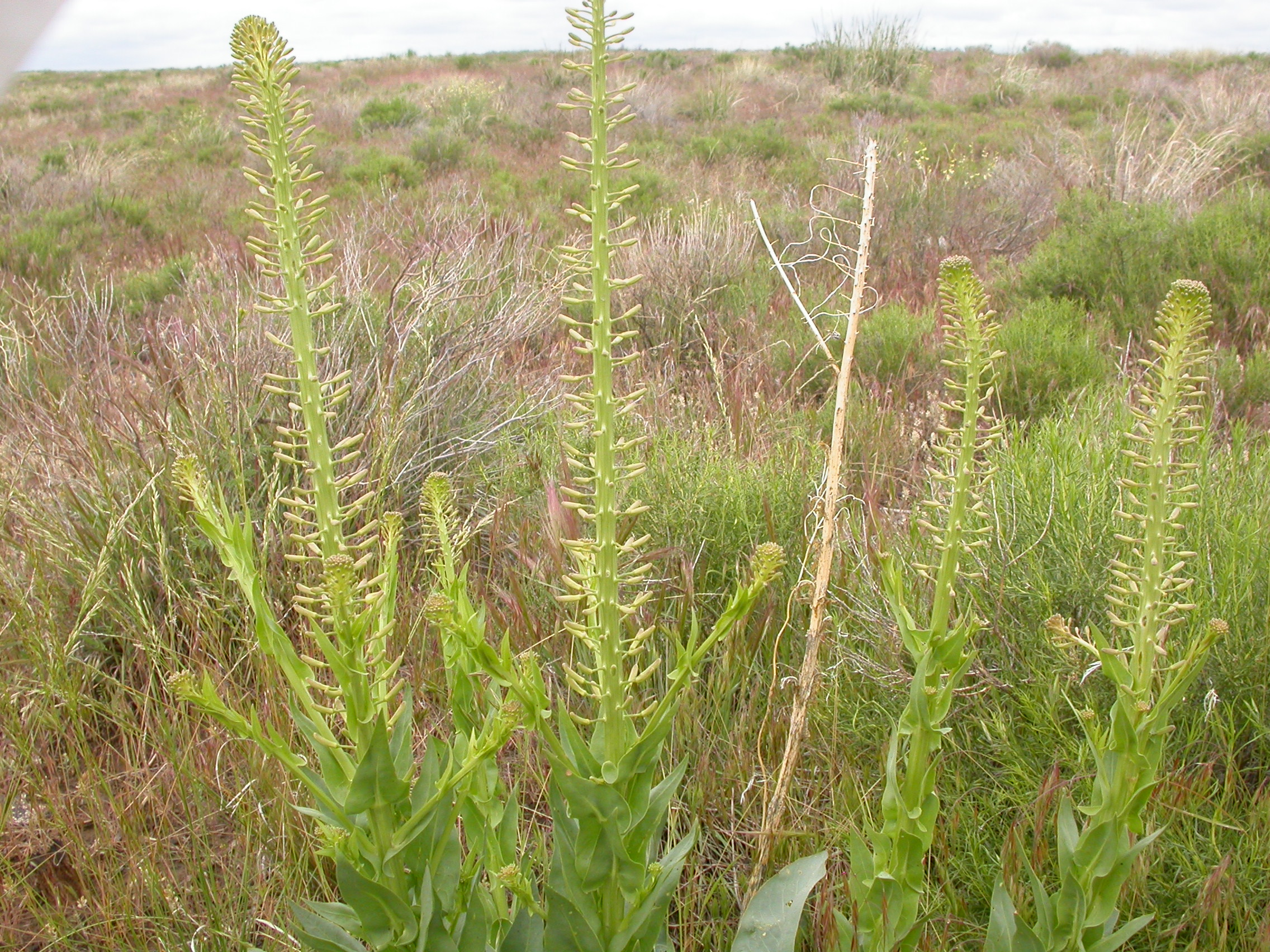

Conservation status
- Apparently Secure (NatureServe)

Scientific classification
- Kingdom: Plantae
- Clade: Tracheophytes
- Clade: Angiosperms
- Clade: Eudicots
- Clade: Rosids
- Order: Brassicales
- Family: Brassicaceae
- Genus: Stanleya
- Species: S. viridiflora

Binomial name
- Stanleya viridiflora Nutt.

= Stanleya viridiflora =

Species of flowering plant

Stanleya viridiflora is a species of flowering plant in the family Brassicaceae known as green princesplume and green-flowered prince's plume. It is native to the western United States, where it occurs in sagebrush and plateau habitat, often on rocky calcareous, sandstone, clay, shale, or volcanic soils.

It is a perennial herb producing a stout erect stem which may exceed a meter in maximum height. It is hairless and sometimes waxy in texture. Its base is a caudex which is generally covered in the remains of withered leaf bases. The leaves have lance-shaped or oblong blades which have smooth or toothed edges or may be divided into a few lobes. The blades may be 22 centimeters long. Some are borne on long petioles, while others, especially those higher on the plant, clasp the stem at their bases. The top of the stem is occupied by a long inflorescence which is an open raceme of many flowers. Each flower bud is enclosed in long, thick sepals which open to reveal yellow or whitish petals each measuring up to 2 centimeters in length. The stamens protruding from the flower's center are 1 or 2 centimeters long. The fruit is a curving, wormlike silique 4 to 7 centimeters in length containing tiny seeds.
