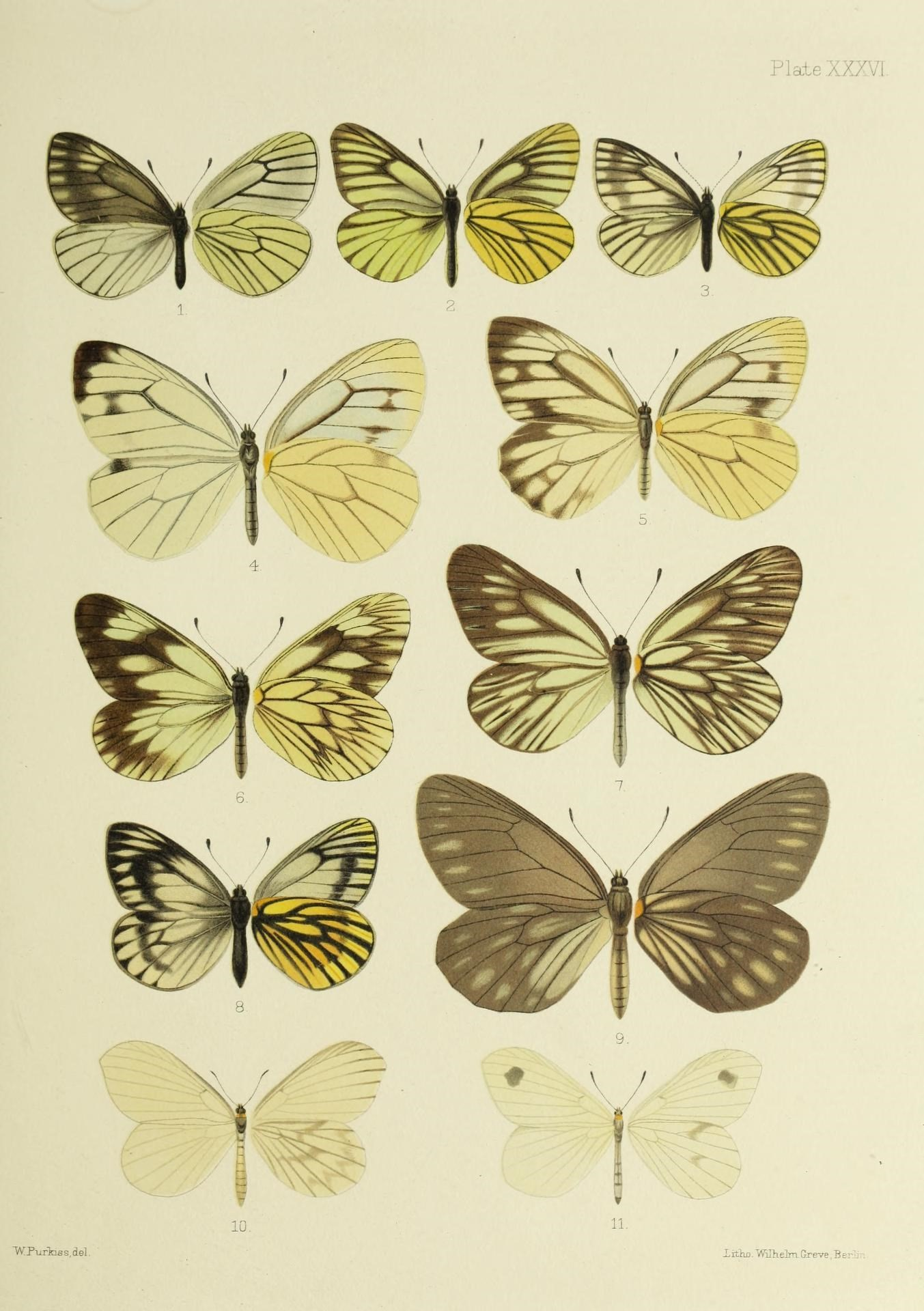
- S.davidis (top left), S.dubernardi (left, second from bottom) and S.venata (top right) in John Henry Leech's Butterflies from China, Japan and Corea

Scientific classification
- Kingdom: Animalia
- Phylum: Arthropoda
- Clade: Pancrustacea
- Class: Insecta
- Order: Lepidoptera
- Family: Pieridae
- Tribe: Pierini
- Genus: Sinopieris; Huang, 1995

Species
- 6, see text

= Sinopieris =

Butterfly genus in family Pieridae

Sinopieris is a genus of butterflies in the family Pieridae. The genus occurs in Gansu, Nepal, Nanshan, Shaanxi, Sichuan, Tibet and Yunnan. All six species were originally included in Pieris and subsequently in Pontia.

From Pieris, this genus is most easily (though not entirely reliably) by the venation in the apical area of the forewing. Most Sinopieris species have a suffused grey or blackish post-discal band whereas Pieris usually have a single (males) or a pair (females) of blackish post-discal spots on the forewings, and no trace of any spot or band on the hindwings.

== Species ==
- Sinopieris davidis (Oberthür, 1876) (Shaanxi, Sichuan, Tibet, Yunnan)
- Sinopieris dubernardi (Oberthür, 1884) (Gansu, Nanshan, Shaanxi, Sichuan, Tibet, Yunnan)
- Sinopieris kozlovi (Alpheraky, 1897) (Xinjiang)
- Sinopieris sherpae (Epstein, 1979) (Nepal)
- Sinopieris stoetzneri (Draeseke, 1925) (Sichuan, Yunnan)
- Sinopieris venata (Leech, 1891) (Ta-chien-lu, at altitude 3050 m)
