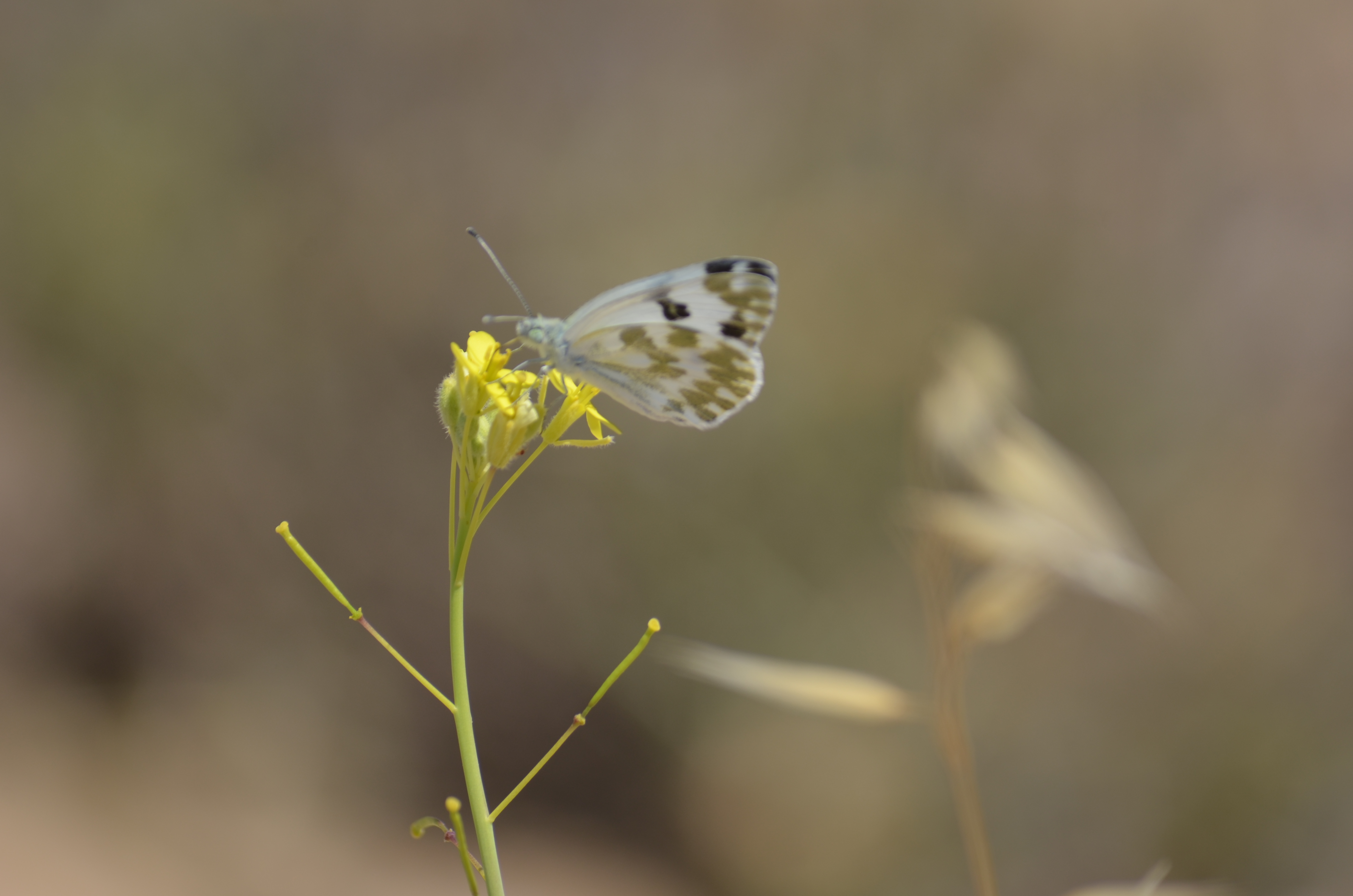
- Djebel Zaghdoud, Tunisia

Conservation status
- Least Concern (IUCN 3.1)

Scientific classification
- Kingdom: Animalia
- Phylum: Arthropoda
- Class: Insecta
- Order: Lepidoptera
- Family: Pieridae
- Genus: Pontia
- Species: P. daplidice

Binomial name
- Pontia daplidice (Linnaeus, 1758)

Synonyms
- Papilio daplidice Linnaeus, 1758; Papilio bellidice Brahm, 1804; Papilio belemida Hübner, [1836-1838]; Pieris daplidice var. albicide Oberthür, 1881; Leucochloe daplidice var. jachontovi Krulikowsky, 1908; Pontia daplidice f. nitida Verity, 1908; Leucochloe daplidice f. hiberna Chnéour, 1934; Pontia daplidice albidice gen. vern. virescentior Rothschild, 1925; Leucochloe daplidice moorei Röber, [1907]; Leucochloe daplidice avidia Fruhstorfer, 1908; Leucochloe daplidice amphimara Fruhstorfer, 1908; Leucochloe daplidice nubicola Fruhstorfer, 1908; Leucochloe daplidice laenas Fruhstorfer, 1908

= Pontia daplidice =

Bath white

Species of butterfly

Pontia daplidice, the Bath white, is a small butterfly of the family Pieridae, the yellows and whites, which occurs in the Palearctic region. It is common in central and southern Europe, migrating northwards every summer, often reaching southern Scandinavia and sometimes southern England.

== Description ==
- The Bath white is a small white butterfly with a wingspan of 45 to 50 mm. The underside of the hindwing has a pattern of greenish blotches, which is characteristic of the Bath whites and easily identifies it from other pierids.
- Sexes can be differentiated by markings on the forewing. The male is differentiated from the female by the markings on the upperside of the forewing. The apex of the forewing is black with white spots and lines. There is a black spot at the end of the cell. In the case of the female, there is an additional discal spot in 1b. The female also has an obscure row of terminal and marginal spots on the upper hindwing.

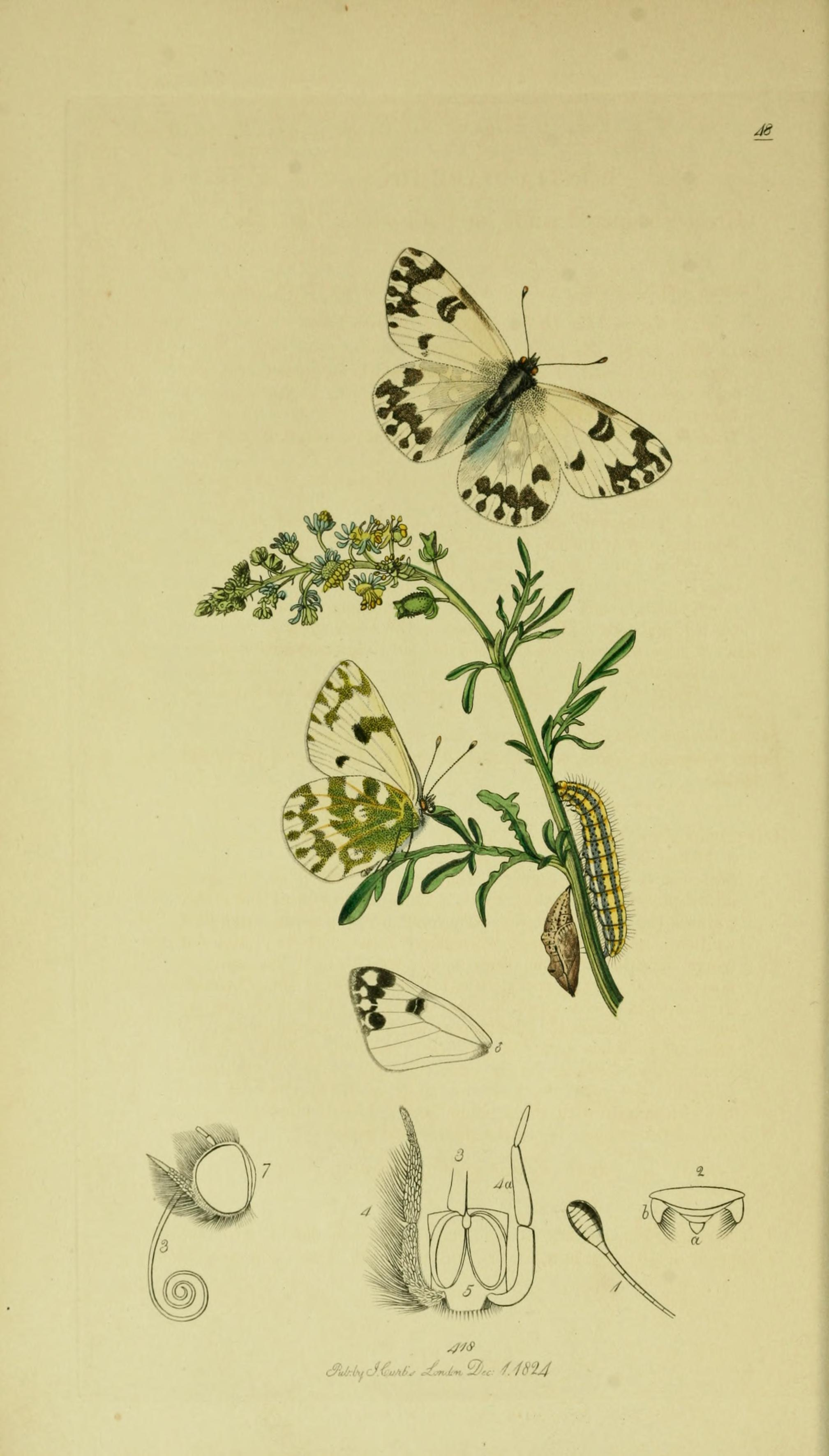
Illustration from John Curtis's British Entomology Volume 5

- Description from C. T. Bingham in The Fauna of British India, Including Ceylon and Burma, "Butterflies Volume 2" (1907).

- Male: Upperside: white. Forewing: basal half of costa narrowly irrorated with black scales, a broad irregular quadrate black spot over the discocellulars; apex and termen anteriorly, above vein 3 broadly black, with a subterminal series of spots of the ground colour, prolonged as fine lines to the terminal margin. Hindwing: uniform, the markings on the underside showing faintly through; a costal spot before the apex, and in some specimens, some obscure, anterior terminal markings indicated by irrorated black scaling. Underside: white. Forewing: the form of the markings as on the upperside but the base of the cell with an irroration of green scales, the black discocellular spot extended to the costa, often washed with green or with a green centre to the black; the apical patch green not black, with the spots of the ground colour on it ill-defined and obscure; a black or greenish-black spot in the outer half of interspace 1. Hindwing: green; costal margin at base yellow; dorsal margin white; a spot in middle of cell, another above it in interspace 7, a curved irregular discal series of conjoined spots beyond the cell, of which the upper two spots in interspaces 1 to 6, white; the veins sometimes faintly yellow. Antennae dusky-black; head, thorax and abdomen fuscous black; beneath; head, thorax and abdomen white.
- Female: Upperside: differs as follows: Forewing: a dusky-black streak extends from the base along costa and terminates at the black spot on the discocellulars; a transverse, somewhat quadrate black spot in the outer half of interspace 1, with sometimes a short ill-defined black streak below it; the black area on apex and anterior portion of termen broader, the white spots on it blurred and obscure. Hindwing: a large costal black spot before apex; a broad, black, subterminal, inwardly diffuse, curved band in continuation of the same, and a terminal series of clavate black marks that start from the outer margin of the black subterminal band. Underside: markings much as in the male but broader. Antennae, head, thorax and abdomen as in the male.
- Wingspan: 52–56 mm

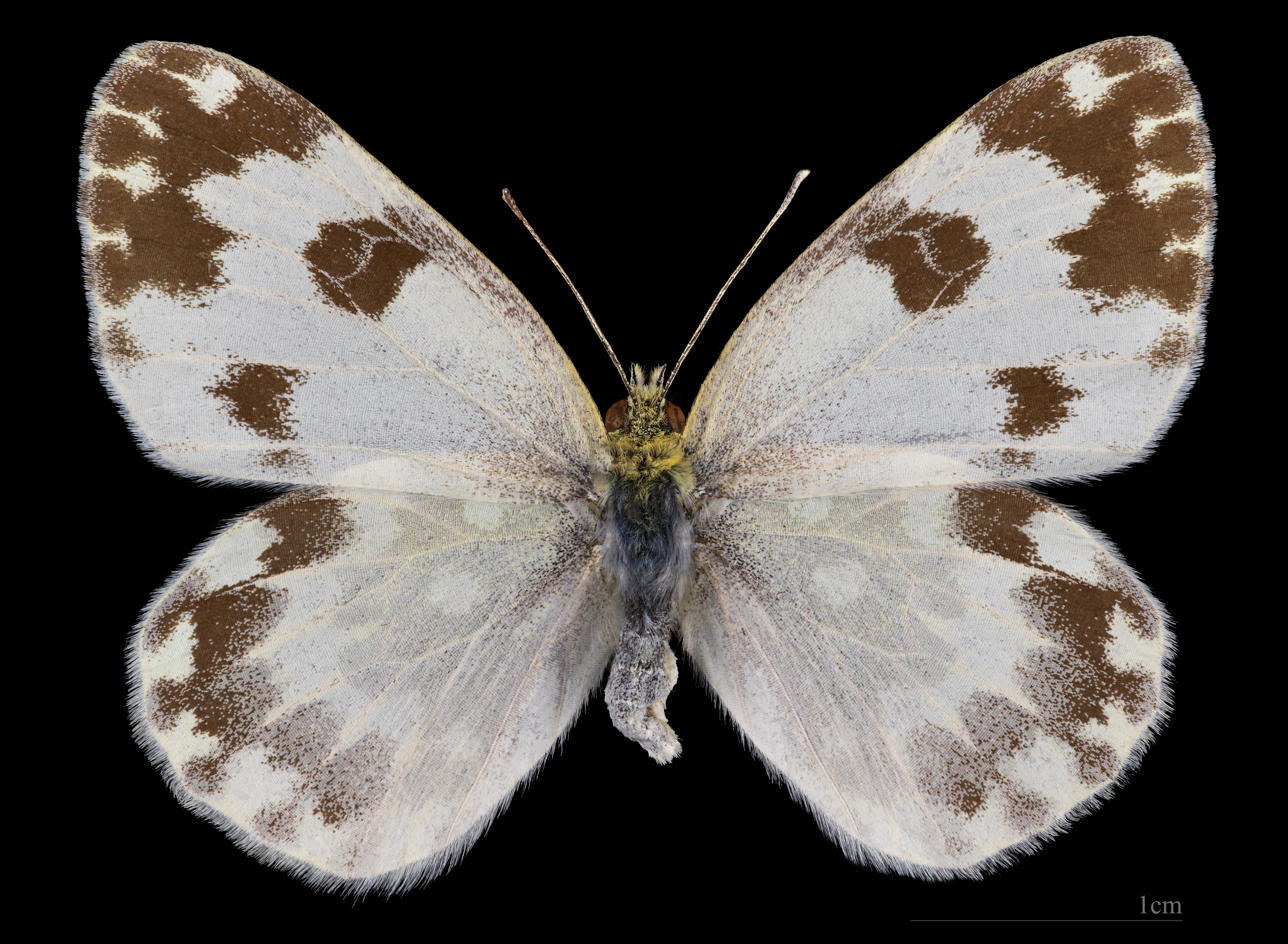
Pontia daplidice ♀

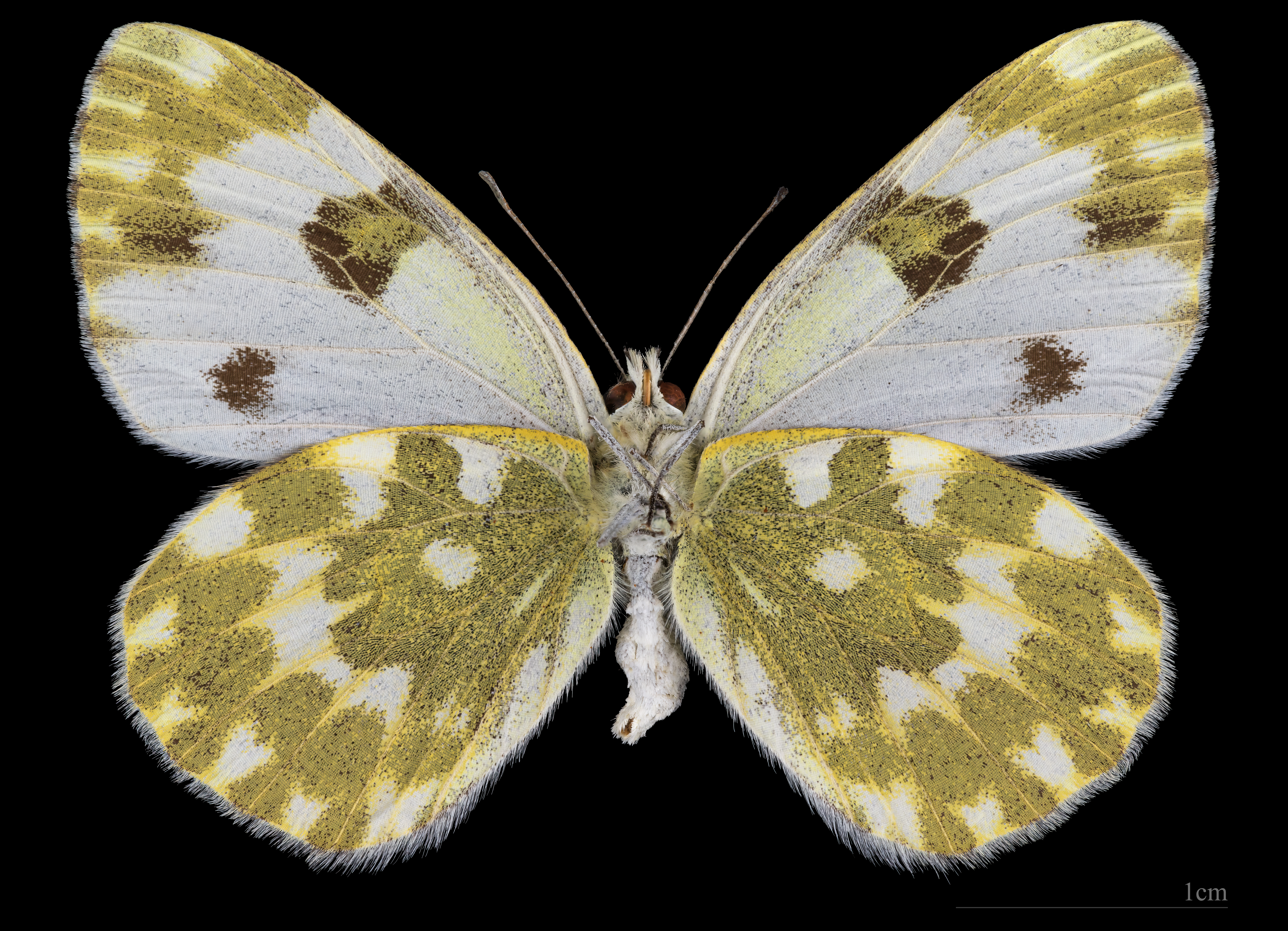
Pontia daplidice♀ △

== Distribution and habitat ==
This butterfly is common in central and southern Europe, Asia Minor, Persia and Afghanistan, migrating northwards in the summer. In Central Asia, the Bath white ranges from Baluchistan, Peshawar, Chitral, Kashmir and along the Himalayas right across the Central Himalayas up to Darjeeling. The butterfly appears to be extending its range westwards along the Himalayas. It is usually found on dry slopes and rough ground with little vegetation.

== Host plants ==
The host plants of the larvae are in the family Brassicaceae and vary according to locality. They include tower mustard (Arabis glabra) and sea rocket (Cakile maritima).

== Taxonomy ==
The following subspecies are recognised:

- Pontia daplidice daplidice (Mauritania, northern Niger, northern Chad, France, south-western Europe, North Africa)
- Pontia daplidice laenas (Fruhstorfer, 1908) (Palestinian territories)
- Pontia daplidice aethiops (de Joannis & Verity, 1913) (highlands of Ethiopia, south-western Arabia, Near East, Afghanistan)
- Pontia daplidice moorei (Roeber, 1907) (Jammu & Kashmir to N.E. India, Yunnan)
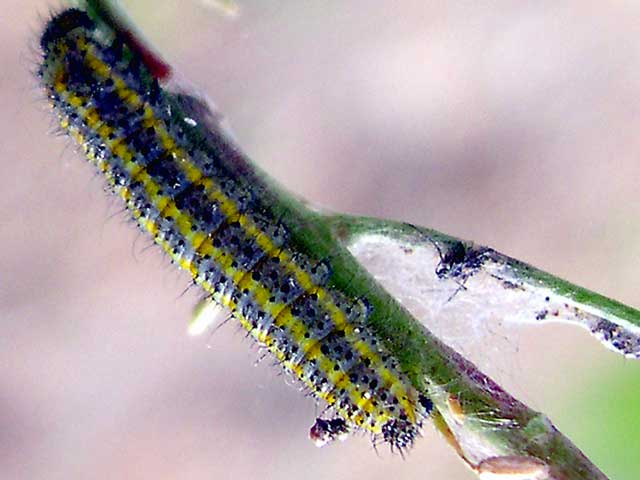
Caterpillar

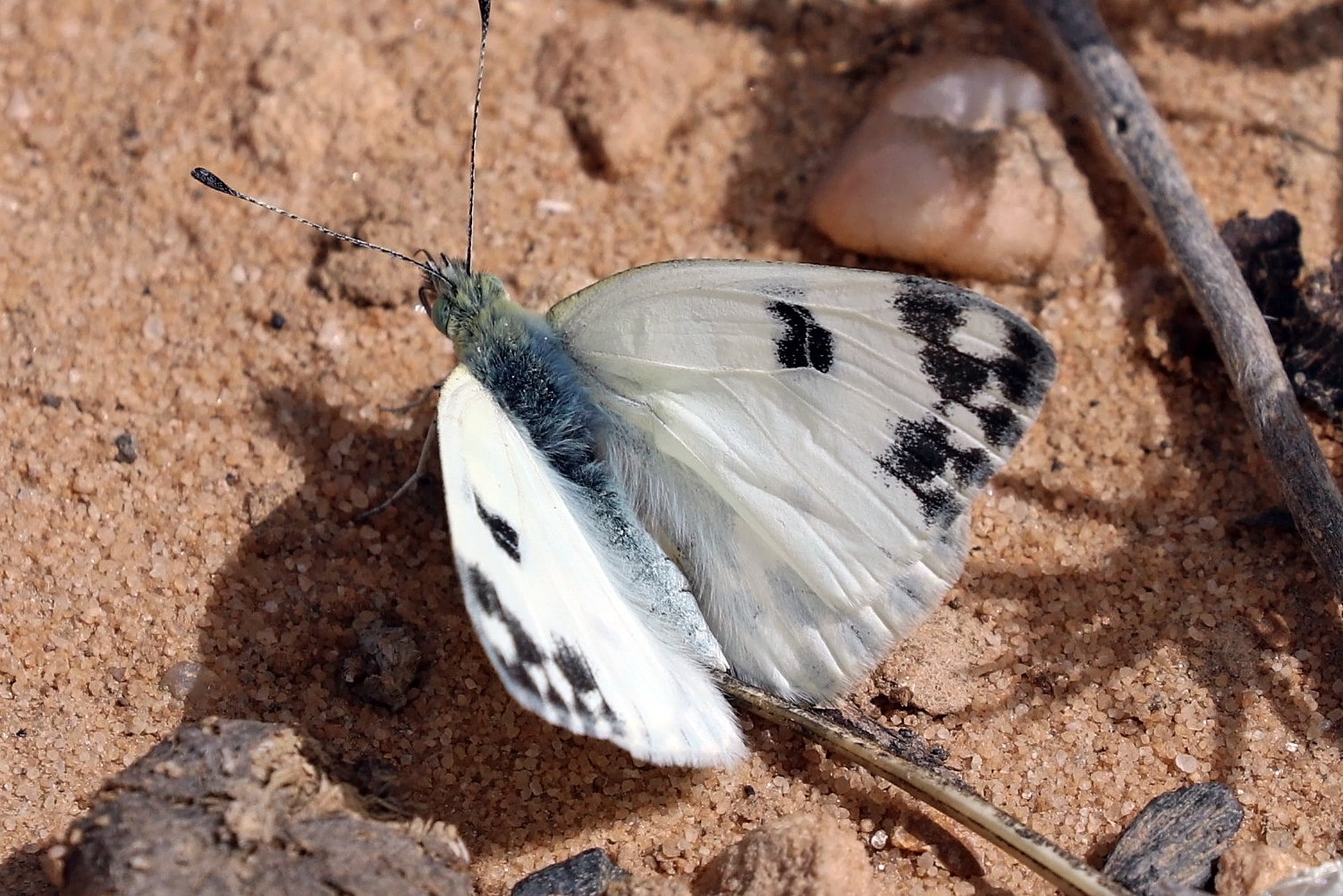
P. d. laenas, Jordan

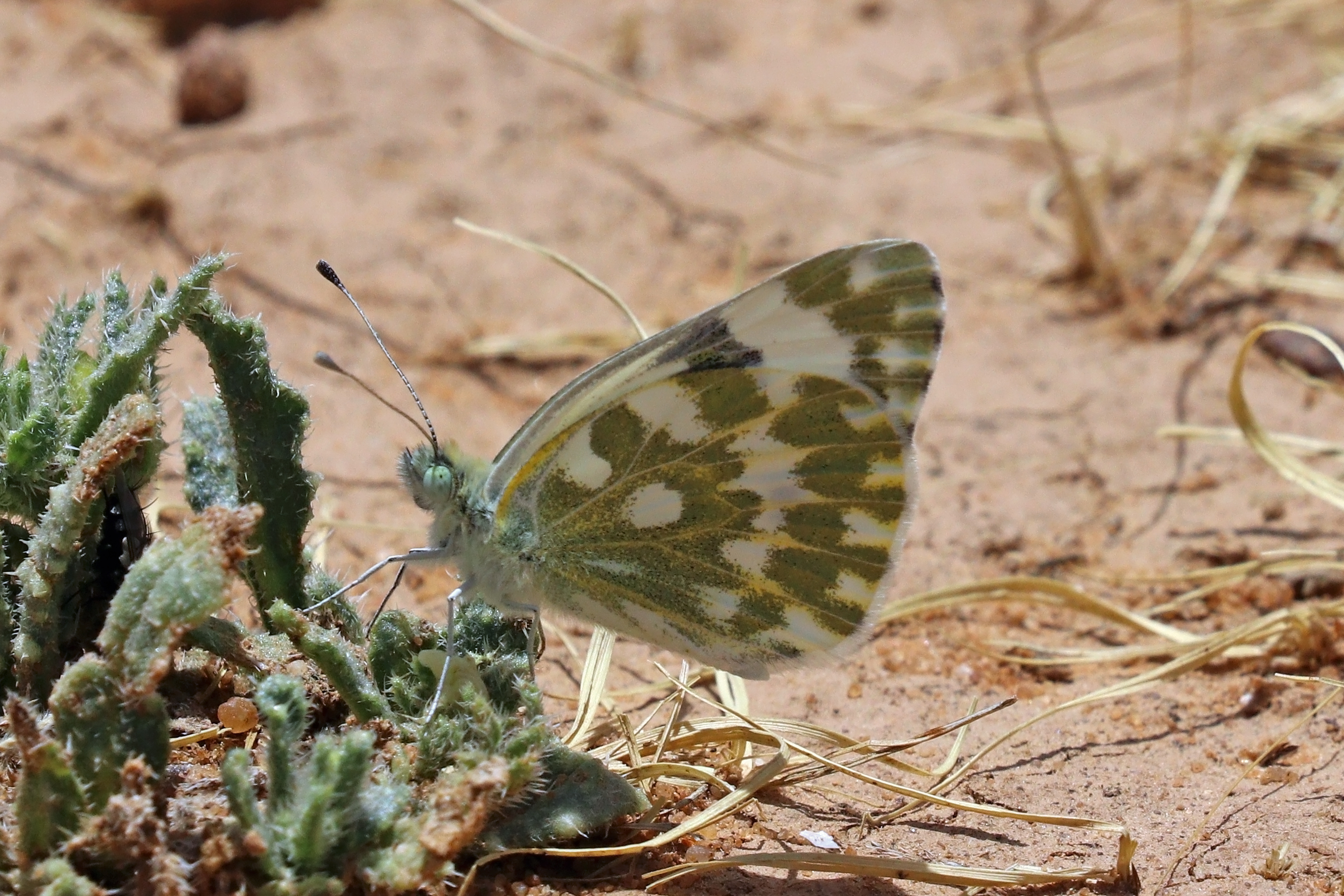
P. d. laenas, Jordan

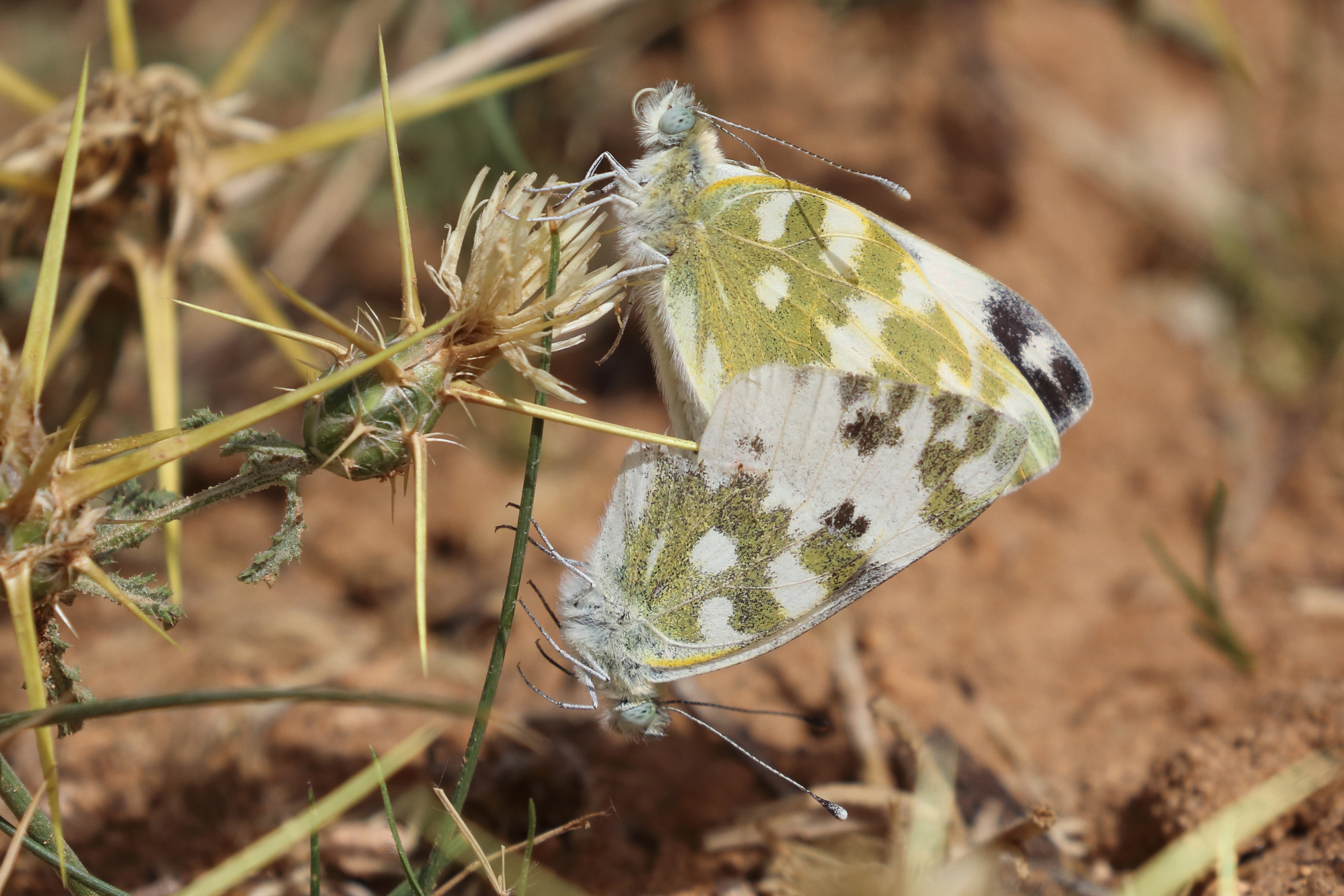
P. d. laenas mating, Jordan

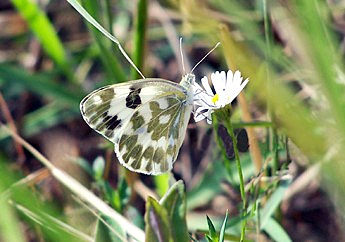
P. d. moorei, India

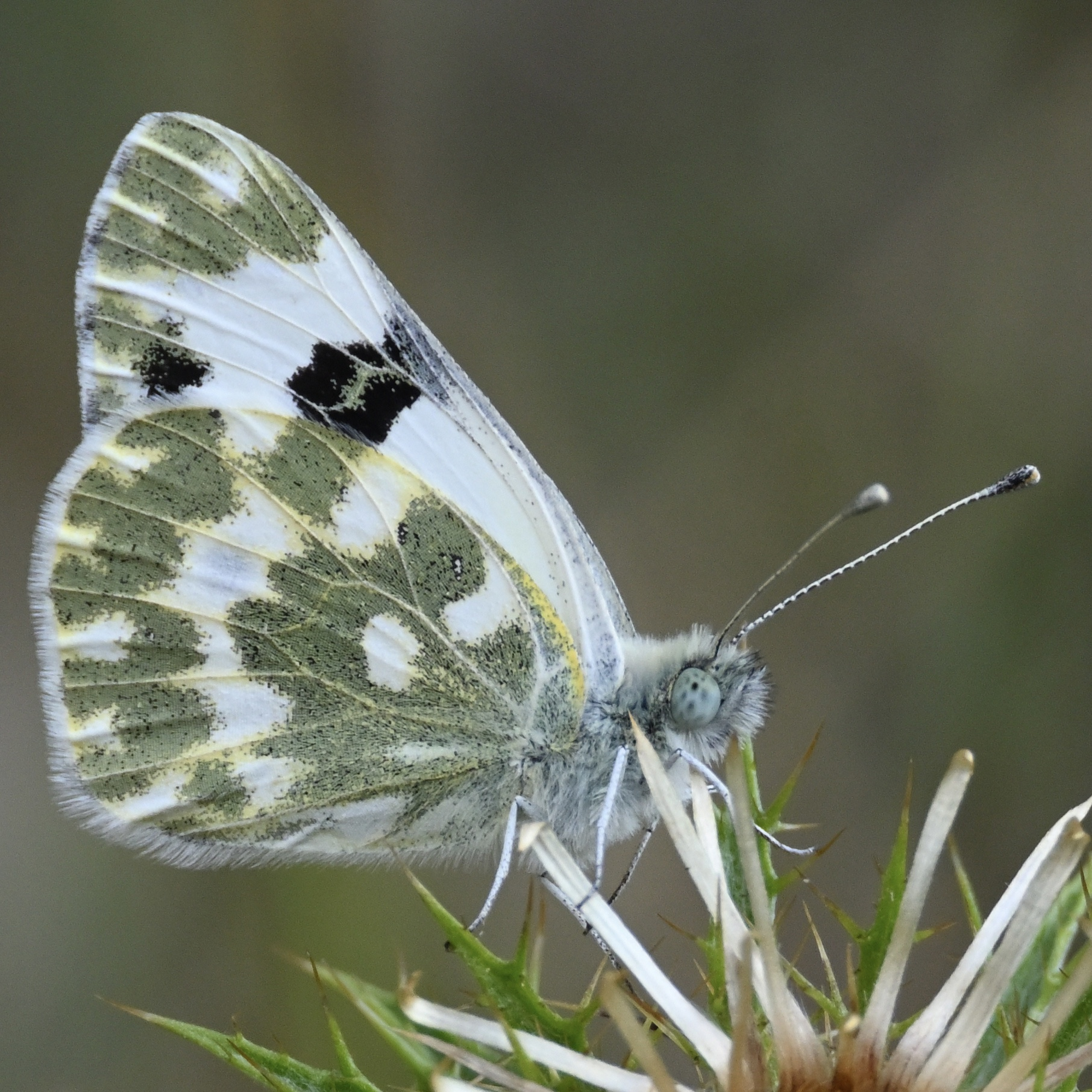
Close-up side view

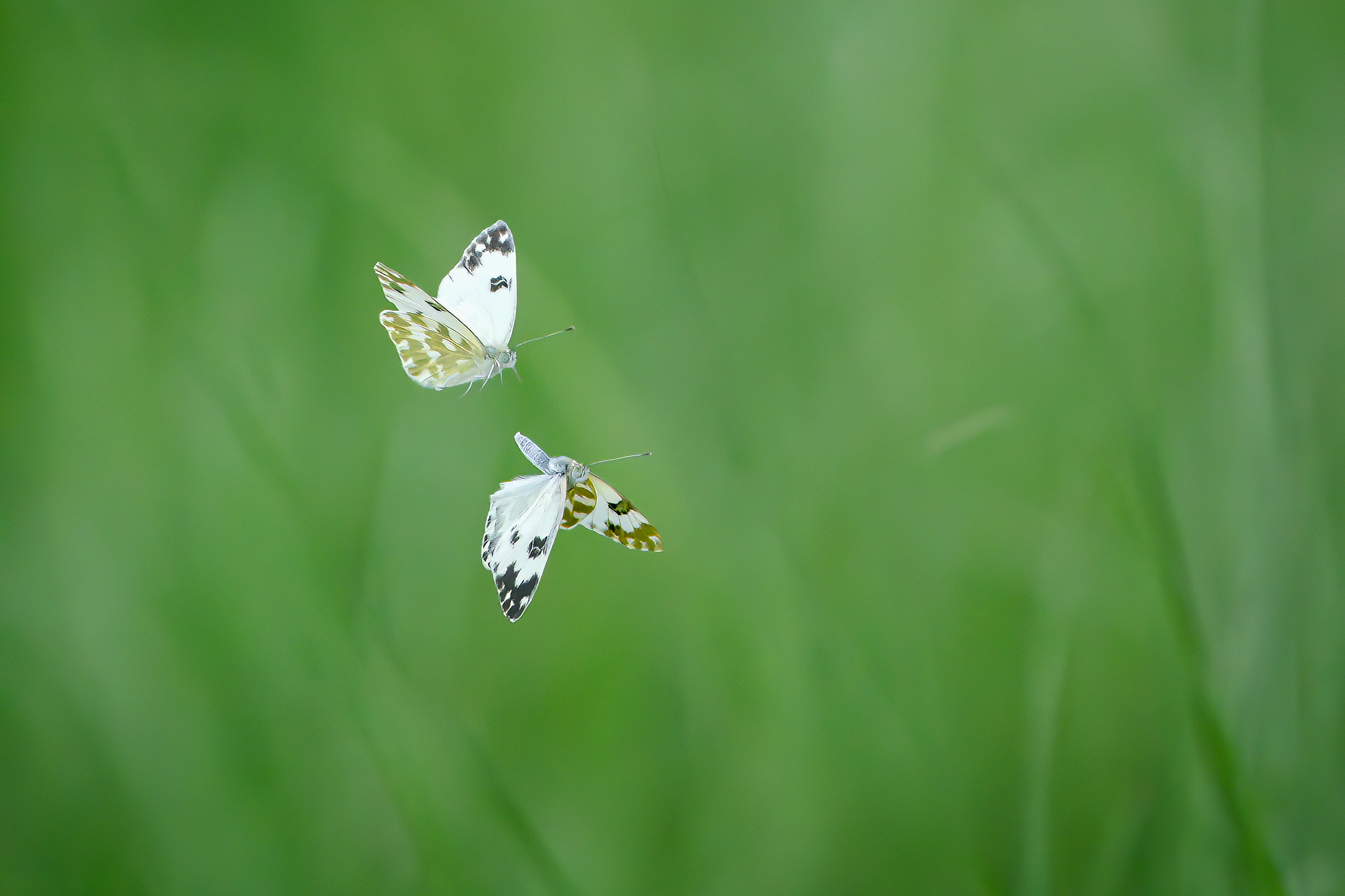
Couple of Bath white butterfly

== Habitat ==
The butterfly lives in the Mediterranean coastal dunes, on rocky, hot slopes etc.

== Pinned specimen from 1702 ==
The Hope Entomological Collection in the Oxford University Museum of Natural History contains a specimen of this species dating from 1702, which is the oldest pinned entomological specimen still on its original pin in existence.
