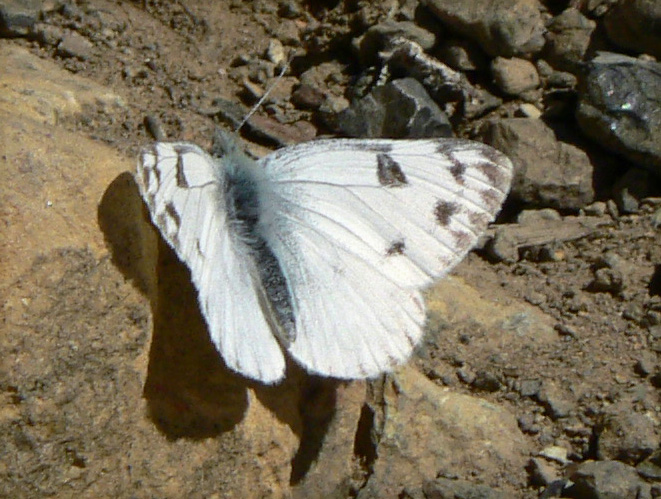

Conservation status
- Secure (NatureServe)

Scientific classification
- Kingdom: Animalia
- Phylum: Arthropoda
- Class: Insecta
- Order: Lepidoptera
- Family: Pieridae
- Genus: Pontia
- Species: P. occidentalis

Binomial name
- Pontia occidentalis Reakirt, 1866

= Pontia occidentalis =

Species of butterfly

Pontia occidentalis, the western white, is a butterfly in the family Pieridae. It is found in Western North America.

== Description ==
The upperside of the forewing has marginal markings that are lighter than the submarginal stripe. Below, forewing tips and hindwings have veins outlined in gray-green. The wingspan is 38 to 53 millimeters. The host plants are from the mustard or cabbage family, Brassicaceae. The caterpillars eat especially the flowers, buds and fruit. In the north of the range, one generation flies in June and July; in the south two generations fly from May to August.
