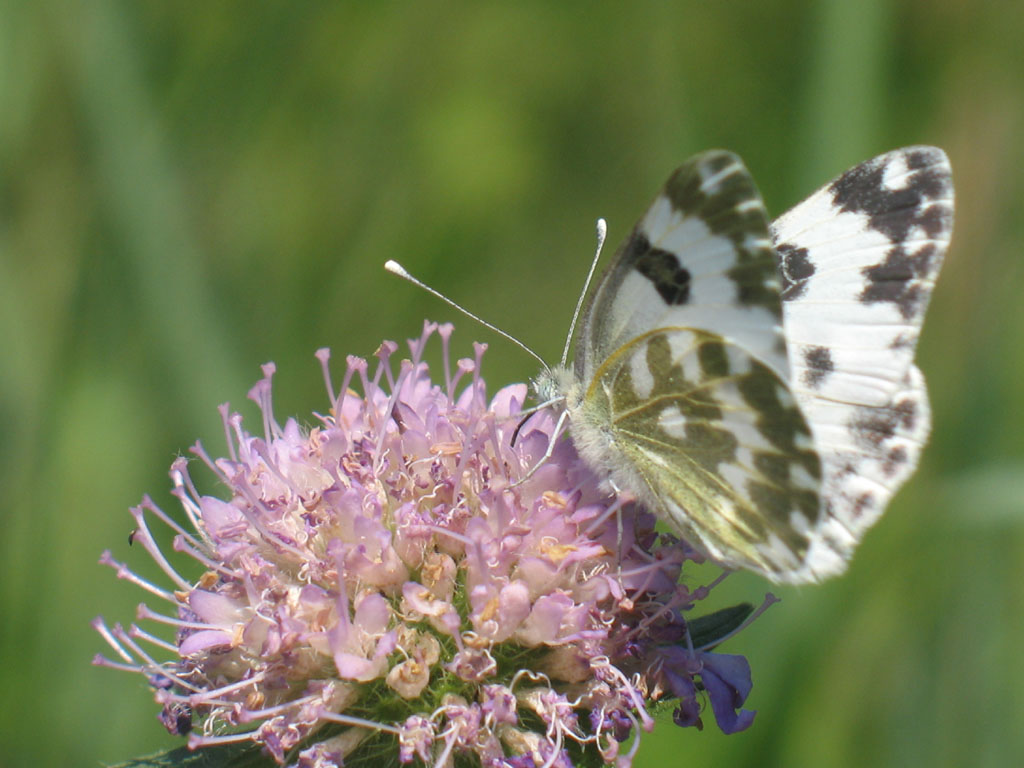
- Pontia edusa edusa on Knautia arvensis near Antsiferovo, Moscow Oblast, Russia

Scientific classification
- Kingdom: Animalia
- Phylum: Arthropoda
- Class: Insecta
- Order: Lepidoptera
- Family: Pieridae
- Tribe: Pierini
- Genus: Pontia; Fabricius, 1807

Species
- Around a dozen, see text

Synonyms
- Mancipium Hübner, [1807]; Synchloe Hübner, 1818; Mancipium Stephens, 1828; Parapieris de Nicéville, 1897; Leucochloë Röber, [1907]; Leucochloe Röber, [1907]; Pontieuchloia Verity, 1929

= Pontia =

Butterfly genus in family Pieridae

Pontia is a genus of pierid butterflies. They are found in the Holarctic, but are rare in Europe and central to eastern North America, and a few species range into the Afrotropics. Several East Asian species once placed here are now more often split off in Sinopieris. Like the closely related genus Pieris, they are commonly called whites.

== Species ==
Listed alphabetically:

- Pontia beckerii (Edwards, 1871) – Becker's white, Great Basin white, or sagebrush white
- Pontia callidice (Hübner, 1799-1800) – peak white
- Pontia chloridice (Hübner, 1808-1813) – small Bath white
- Pontia daplidice (Linnaeus, 1758) – Bath white
- Pontia distorta (Butler, 1886) – small meadow white
- Pontia edusa (Fabricius, 1777) - eastern Bath white
- Pontia glauconome (Klug, 1829) – desert (Bath) white
- Pontia helice (Linnaeus, 1764) – meadow white
- Pontia occidentalis (Reakirt, 1866) – western white
- Pontia protodice (Boisduval & Le Conte, 1830) – checkered white
- Pontia sisymbrii (Boisduval, 1852) – spring white, California white, or Colorado white

Some other species are occasionally placed here, but alternatively in other genera. Pontia extensa may belong in Pieris, while a number of other species from the China region are often split off in Sinopieris:

- Pontia davidis (Shaanxi, Sichuan, Tibet, Yunnan)
- Pontia dubernardi (Gansu, Nanshan, Shaanxi, Sichuan, Tibet, Yunnan)
- Pontia kozlovi (Xinjiang)
- Pontia sherpae (Nepal)
- Pontia stoetzneri (Sichuan, Yunnan)
- Pontia venata (Ta-chien-lu, at altitude 3000 m)
