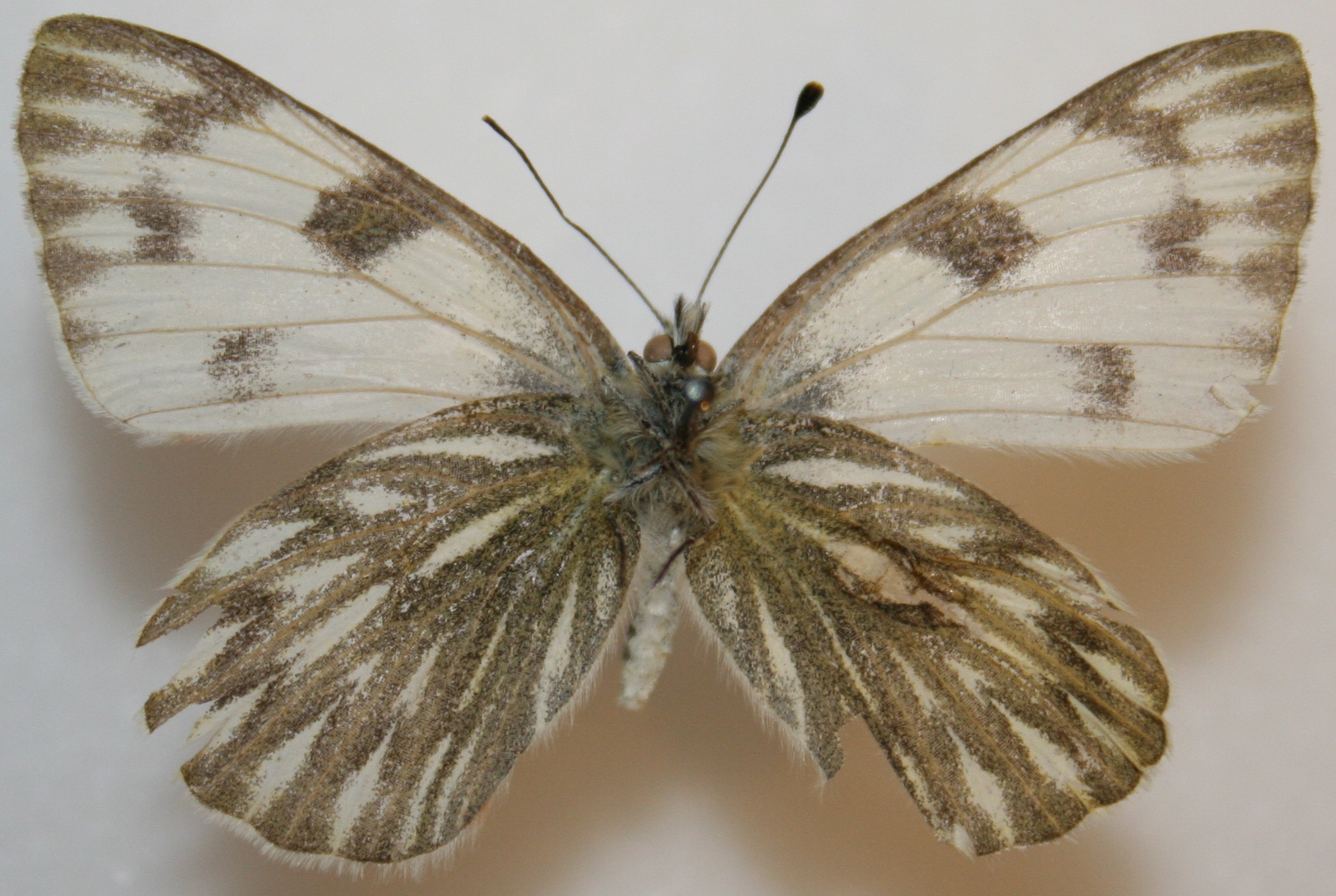
- Underside of the female

Conservation status
- Secure (NatureServe)

Scientific classification
- Kingdom: Animalia
- Phylum: Arthropoda
- Clade: Pancrustacea
- Class: Insecta
- Order: Lepidoptera
- Family: Pieridae
- Genus: Pontia
- Species: P. protodice

Binomial name
- Pontia protodice (Boisduval & Leconte, 1830)
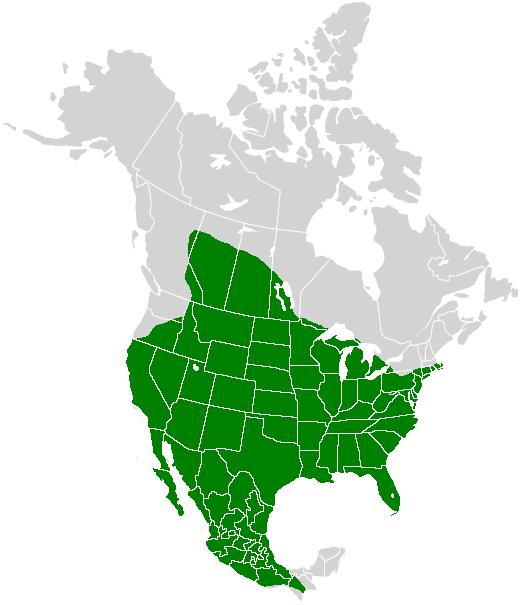

Synonyms
- Pieris protodice

= Pontia protodice =

Checkered white

Species of butterfly

Pontia protodice, the checkered white or southern cabbage butterfly, is a common North American butterfly in the family Pieridae. Its green larva is a type of cabbage worm.

== Description ==
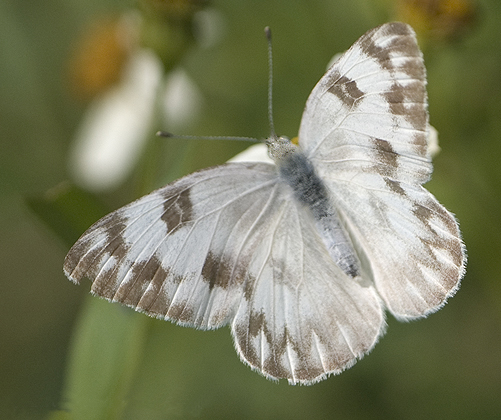
Female

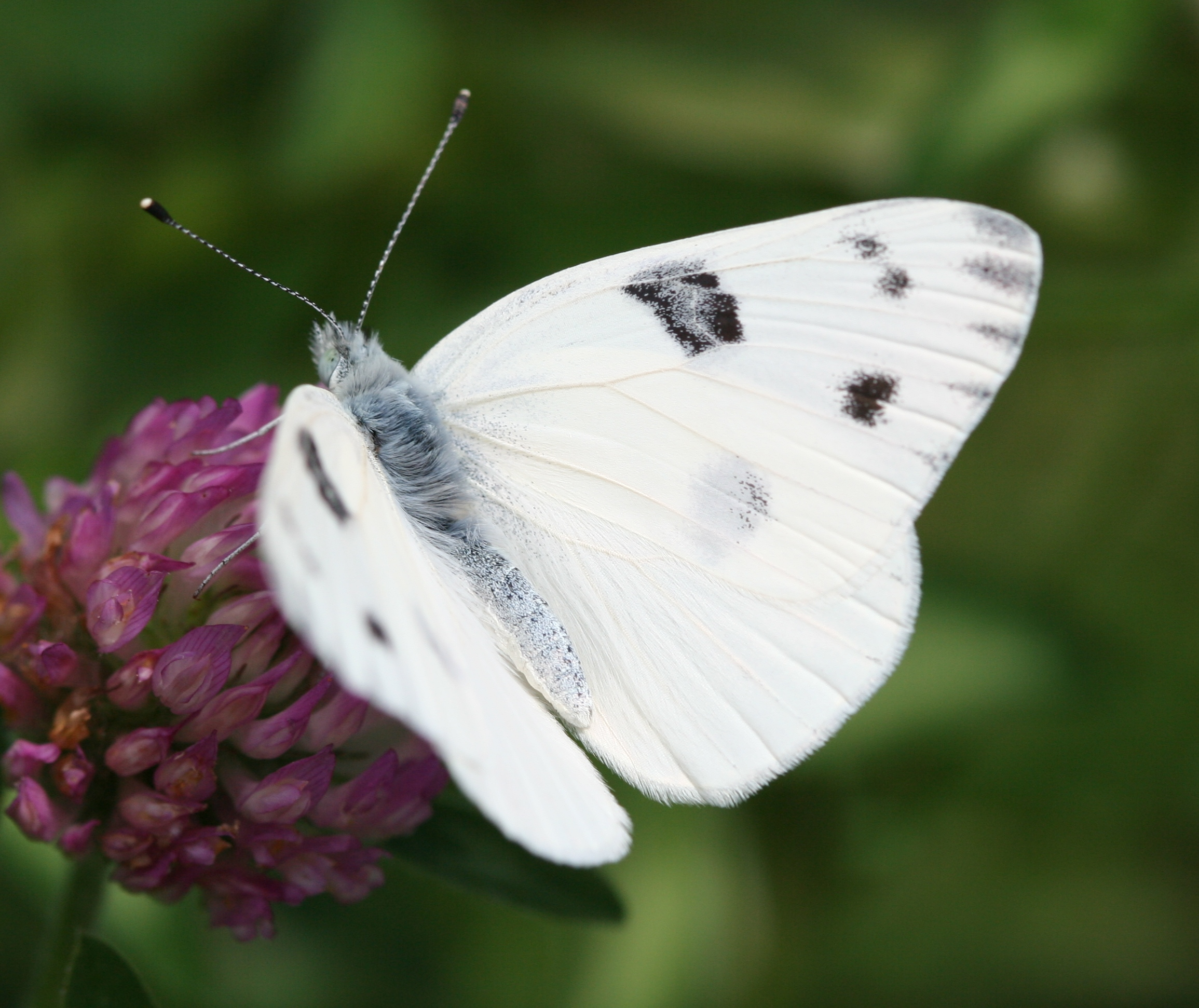
Male

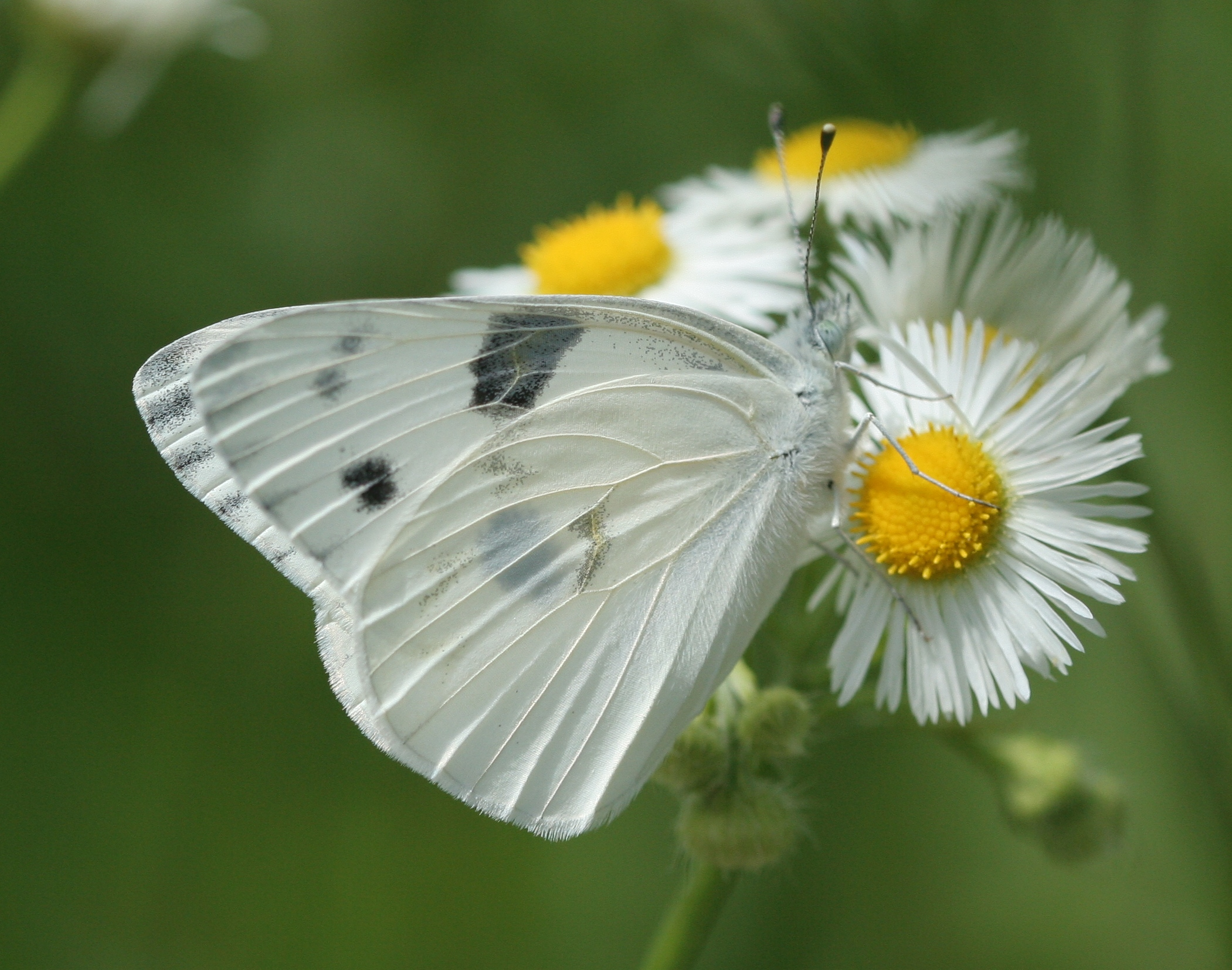
Underside of the male

The upperside of the wings are white and marked with black and gray, more so on the female than on the male. The underside of the hindwings is marked with extensive yellow-brown veins. The wingspan is 1.25–1.75 inches (3.2–4.4 cm). In its pre-adult form, the egg is orange, and mature larvae are black dotted and bluish green to gray with a yellow dorsal, lateral and sublateral stripe. The pupa overwinters, and varies in color from blue-gray to cream.

== Distribution ==
Pontia protodice is most commonly found in the southern parts on the United States along with some of the northern areas of Mexico. Occasionally the species can be found in the northern parts of the U.S. and southern Canada. It is absent from the Pacific Northwest and the New England area, although populations have become increasingly erratic just east of the Appalachians.P. protodice are most widespread in late summer and autumn, not earlier in the season.

== Habitat ==
Habitats are open areas, including desert, plains, and disturbed areas. Virtually any disturbed dry open area such as vacant lots, railroads, airports, dry grassland, deserts and cities are potential areas of inhabitation. In addition, populations may sometimes be found in sparsely wooded areas, grasslands, and meadows in the prairie and parkland regions, usually in areas without heavy shade. Though it may seem these species of butterfly inhabit a wide range of environments, they have been found to be absent from certain counties for many years at a time.

== Nectar plants ==
Checkered whites have been seen nectaring on mustards, composites, and alfalfa.

== Host plants ==
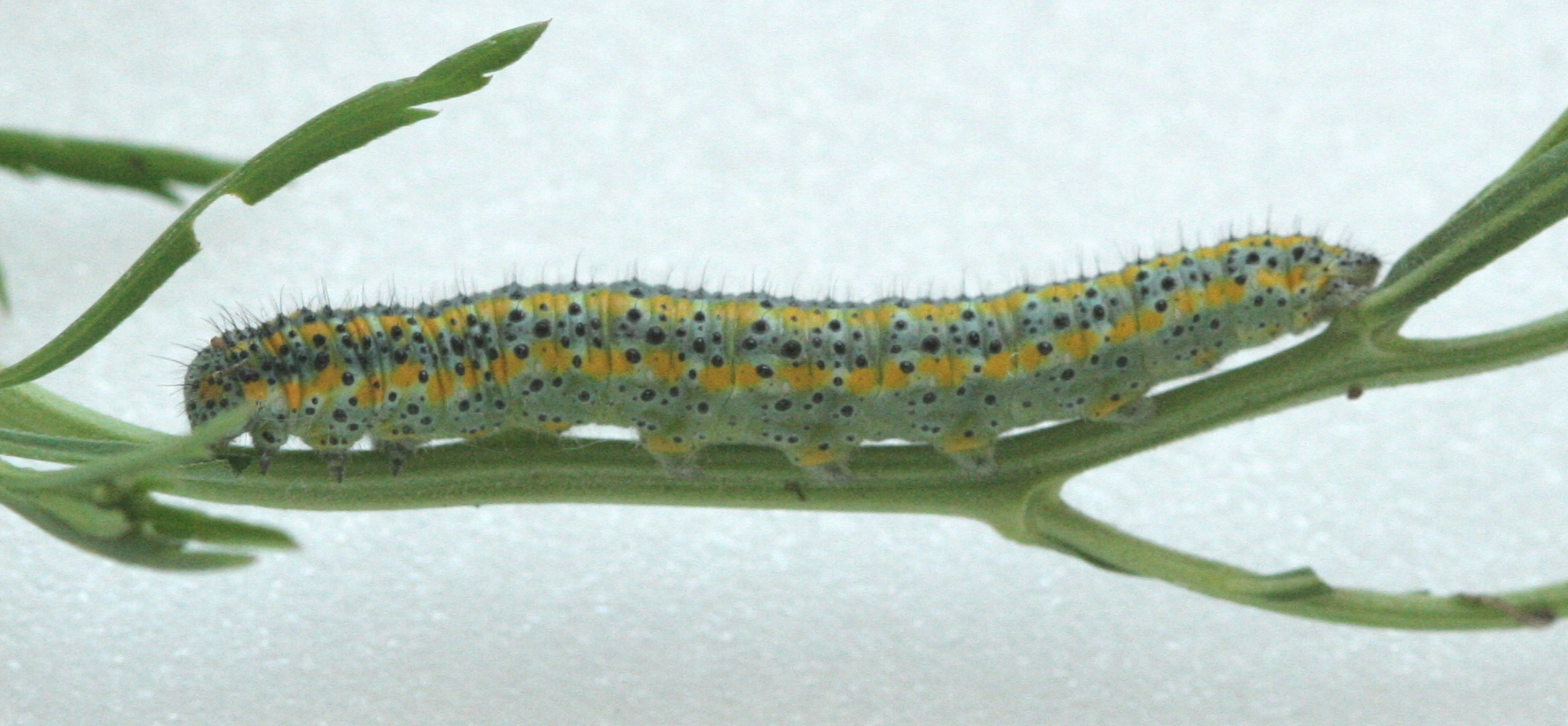
Larva

The host plants for this species include Brazos rockcress (Arabis petiolaris), sicklepod (Senna obtusifolia), black mustard (Brassica nigra), broccoli (Brassica oleraceae italica), Brussels sprouts (Brassica oleraceae gemmifera), cabbage (Brassica oleraceae capitata), cauliflower (Brassica oleraceae botrytis), turnip (Brassica rapa), pinnate tansy-mustard (Descurainia pinnata), flixweed tansy-mustard (Descurainia sophia), prairie pepperweed (Lepidium densiflorum), Virginia pepper-grass (Lepidium virginicum), radish (Raphanus sativus), tumble mustard (Sisymbrium altissimum), and field pennycress (Thlaspi arvense).

== Behavior ==
=== Sexual selection ===
In order to increase their reproductive fitness, male P. protodice must select a female who will put his investment to good use. One trait that males select for is bigger size and longer forewing length. It is unknown whether larger females are preferred by males or whether larger females can simply be seen at greater distances than their smaller conspecifics.

Males also tend to prefer younger females with whom they copulate for longer periods of time. The dorsal wing surface of females are partially ultraviolet reflective, especially in older females who have melanic markings. As females get older, they tend to accumulate tattering and scale loss which are consequences of increased contact with vegetation during feeding and their search for oviposition sites. Thus, their wings become worn. UV absorbing pigments located on these scales explain the changes in UV reflectance as a female becomes older. Males use this cue to evaluate the age of a female conspecific. It is quite a reliable cue, as the spermatophores of worn females tend to be completely collapsed and empty.

=== Paternal investment ===
It is assumed that many species of male butterflies contribute nothing but sperm to the offspring. Some males, including male P. protodice pass on nutrients along with sperm into the female reproductive tract during copulation. The nutrients contain protein that, can be used by the female for egg production and for somatic maintenance during the female's search for oviposition sites. This can be thought of as a form of paternal investment. Male secretions are received by the female in the bursa copulatrix which is composed of the corpus bursa and the appendix bursa, the latter of which is filled with a spermatophore containing the sperm and secretions during copulation. During copulation, males on average pass on 7-8% of their precopulatory body mass, with the actual percent of body mass passed inversely correlated with measures of body mass. Therefore, a smaller male must pass on a larger fraction of his body mass in the process. It seems that female size does not influence the quantity of material passed.

=== Female advancements ===
Males are efficient at finding females, making courtship solicitation by females rare. However, female P. protodice have been seen to actively approach and chase both conspecific males and females. When directed at other females, interactions last only a few seconds; however, when directed at males, this behavior is most likely an attempt to solicit male courtship. As a female flies about feeding and searching for oviposition sites, the contents of the spermatophore decreases in size, and the female becomes interested in re-mating. On average females deplete material received from males in 5 to 7 days. Thus, females who try to solicit courtship only do so when their spermatophore is emptying and they want to receive a fresh batch. Both virgin and previously mated females have been seen to initiate courtships, with various underlying reasons. Virgin females approach males possibly because they are cryptic while perched and must become more conspicuous in their pursuit. However, previously mated females are driven by a different reason, the fact that they are less likely to be attractive to males. As a result, they must attempt to elicit courtships to maximize their reproductive options. Another reason encompassing both virgin and previously mated females is that females leave areas of high population density due to male harassment and must actively seek males and adapt to a new environment.

=== Copulation behavior ===
In courtships, females land on exposed perches and the following major events occur: the male contacts the female, the male begins probing, the male abdomen comes between the female's hindwings, and lastly the male stops moving. Aside from many other butterfly species, P. protodice females lack an abdominal extension response. A male does nothing more than land on a female's thorax and couple with her. In half of all courtships, females also exhibit a low amplitude flutter response which seems to have no effect on the duration of copulation.

In addition, in situations where they want to fend off a male's advances, female P. protodice exhibit a rejection behavior, initiated as if they are aware of the presence of a full spermatophore. The female's wings are fully opened with the tips below the horizontal. In addition, the abdomen is elevated to 45-60 degrees above the body axis and the genitalia are extruded. This rejection posture has often been misconstrued as an invitation to mating, as other butterflies such as the Heliconius use it to attract mates.

=== Sexual conflict in migration ===
In general male pupae develop faster than their conspecific females, and as a result, eclose earlier in the season than females. In addition, they are typically ready to mate within 24 hours of eclosion. This is the reason why there seems to be a high ratio of males to receptive females. In this high-density environment, females are often harassed by males. They will be approached by more than one males at a time within seconds of flight, and the males will often remain in the vicinity for long periods of time. In this situation, females are forced down a gradient of male density, encouraging emigration out of the colony. They will emigrate and colonize new habitats in the process. It is only in instances of increased male death and still emergent females, late in the breeding season, that the numbers balance and no emigration occurs.

=== Thermoregulatory behavior ===
P. protodice require elevated body temperatures of 30-40 degrees Celsius in order to fly, and this is achieved by behavioral orientation to solar radiation. Pieris butterflies, including P. protodice use a behavioral posture for thermoregulation called reflectance basking, in which the wings are used as a sort of biological solar reflector in order to reflect radiation to the body and increase body temperature. In the reflectance basking posture, the dorsal body surface is positioned towards the sun, and the wings are subsequently held open at an angle. The posture suggests that the butterfly is using its white dorsal wing surface to reflect radiation onto their bodies.

== See also ==
- Pieris brassicae
- Pieris rapae
