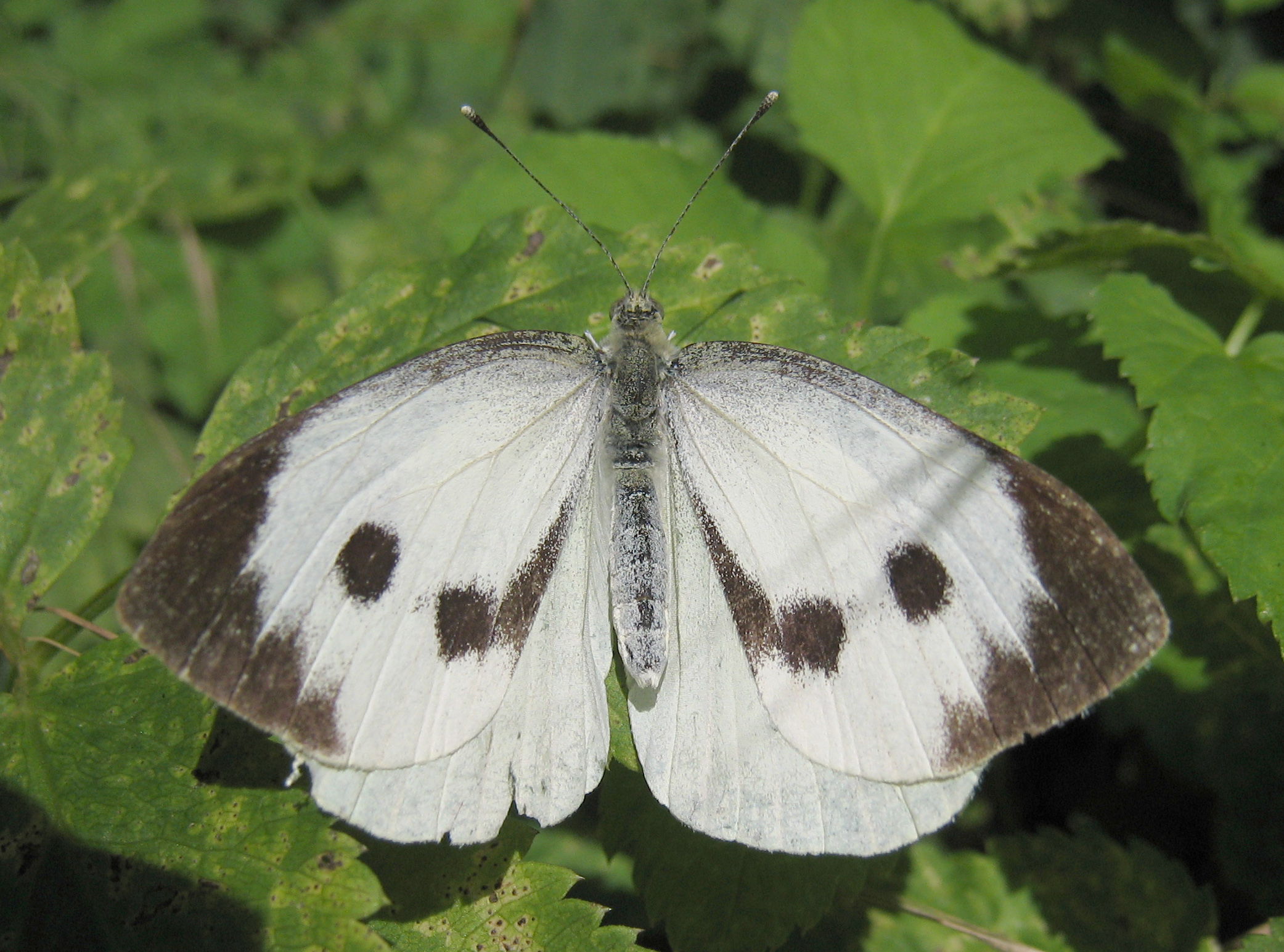

Scientific classification
- Kingdom: Animalia
- Phylum: Arthropoda
- Clade: Pancrustacea
- Class: Insecta
- Order: Lepidoptera
- Family: Pieridae
- Tribe: Pierini
- Subtribe: Pierina; Swainson, 1820

= Pierina (butterfly) =

Subtribe of butterflies

Pierina is a subtribe of cabbage whites, checkered whites, albatrosses in the family Pieridae. There are about 8 genera and 18 described species in Pierina.

== Genera ==
Around twenty genera belong to the subtribe Pierina, some of which are:

- Ascia Scopoli, 1777
- Ganyra Billberg, 1820
- Itaballia Kaye, 1904
- Leptophobia Butler, 1870
- Pieriballia Klots, 1933
- Pieris Schrank, 1801
- Pontia Fabricius, 1807 (checkered whites)
