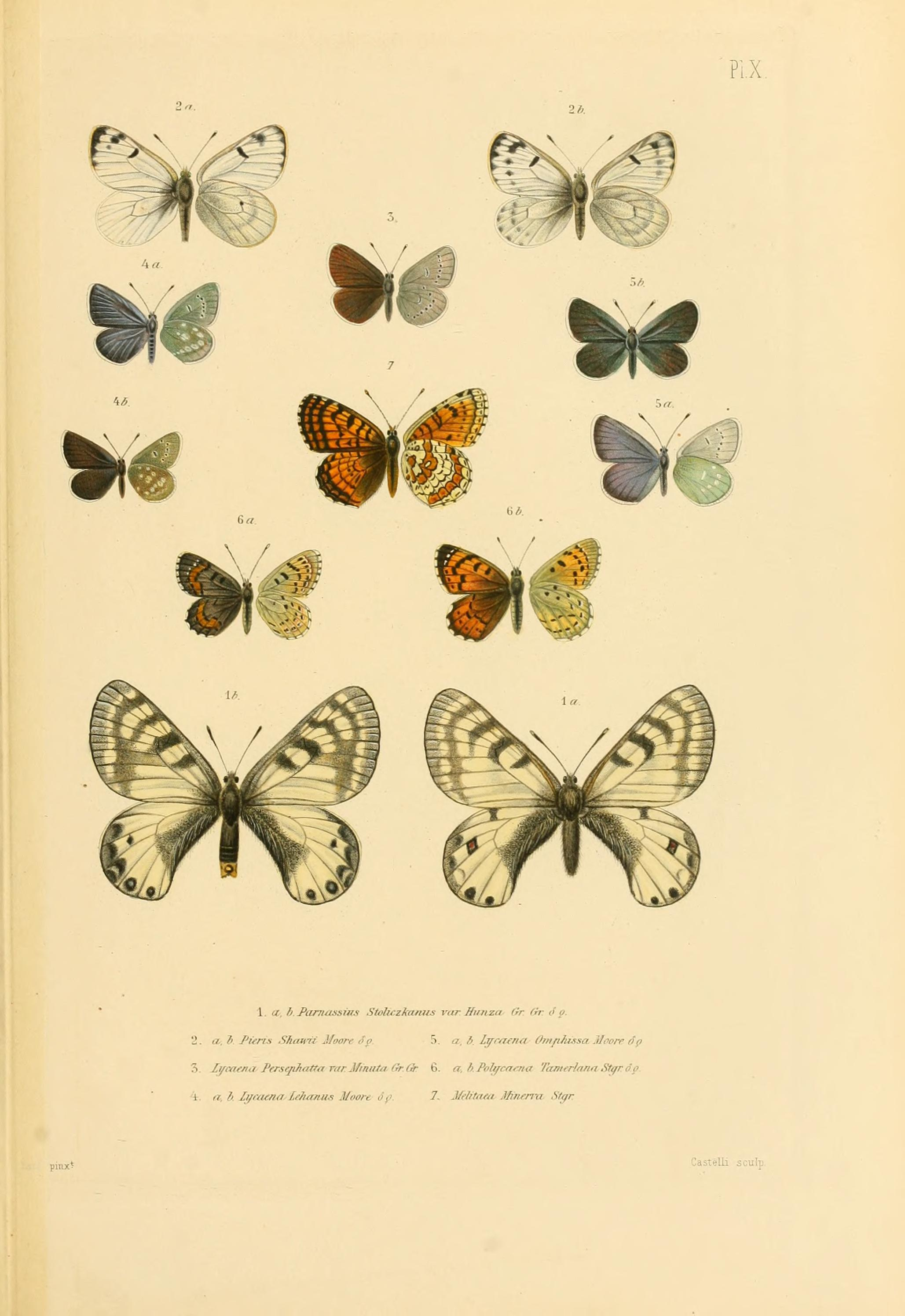
- Baltia shawi, figures 2a and b

Scientific classification
- Kingdom: Animalia
- Phylum: Arthropoda
- Clade: Pancrustacea
- Class: Insecta
- Order: Lepidoptera
- Family: Pieridae
- Tribe: Pierini
- Genus: Baltia; Moore, 1878

= Baltia (butterfly) =

Butterfly genus in family Pieridae

Baltia is a Palearctic genus of butterflies in the family Pieridae. The genus was erected by Frederic Moore in 1878. The three species are found in the Himalayas.

== Species ==
- Baltia butleri (Moore, 1882)
- Baltia shawi (H. Bates, 1873)
- Baltia sikkima Fruhstorfer, 1903
