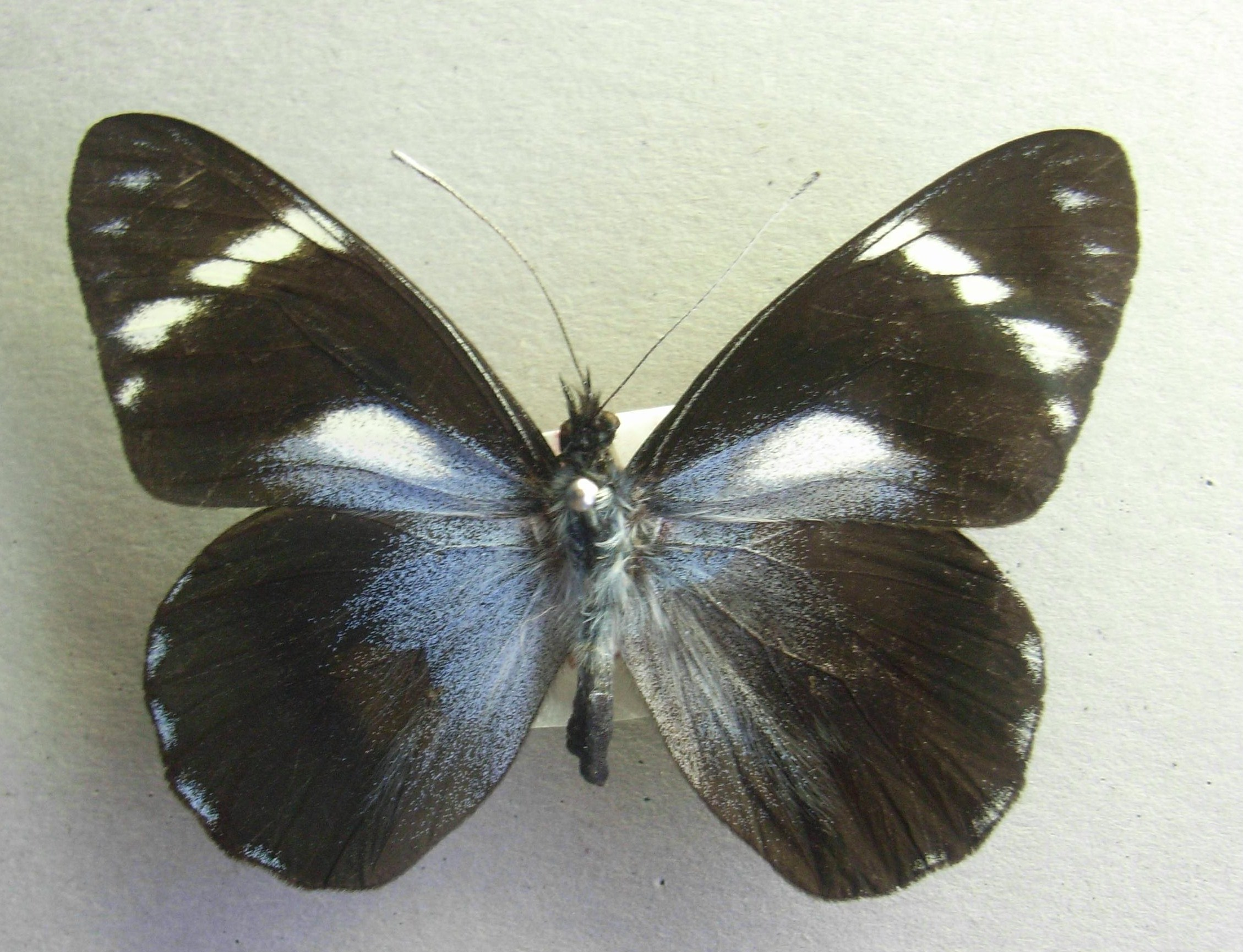

Scientific classification
- Kingdom: Animalia
- Phylum: Arthropoda
- Class: Insecta
- Order: Lepidoptera
- Family: Pieridae
- Genus: Pereute
- Species: P. telthusa

Binomial name
- Pereute telthusa (Hewitson, 1860)

Synonyms
- Euterpe telthusa Hewitson, 1860; Pereute telthusa boliviana Röber, 1908; Pereute telthusa magna Röber, 1908

= Pereute telthusa =

Species of butterfly

Pereute telthusa is a butterfly of the family Pieridae. It is found in South America, including Peru, Ecuador, Bolivia and the lower Amazon in Brazil.
