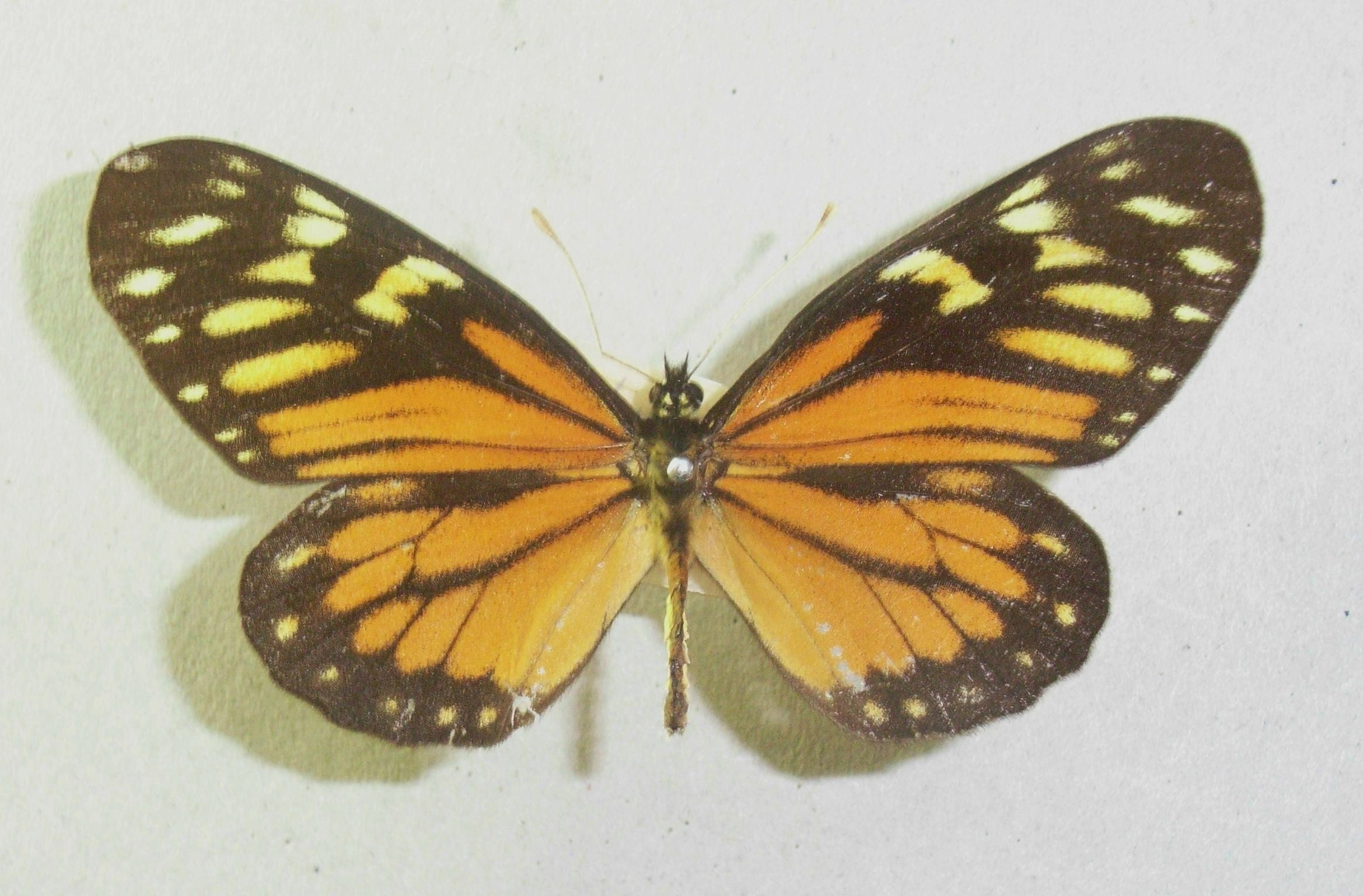
- Charonia seurytele

Scientific classification
- Kingdom: Animalia
- Phylum: Arthropoda
- Clade: Pancrustacea
- Class: Insecta
- Order: Lepidoptera
- Family: Pieridae
- Tribe: Pierini
- Genus: Charonias; Röber, [1908]

Species
- See text.

= Charonias =

Genus of butterflies

Charonias is a Neotropical genus of butterflies in the family Pieridae.

== Species ==
- Charonias eurytele (Hewitson, 1853)
- Charonias theano (Boisduval, 1836)
