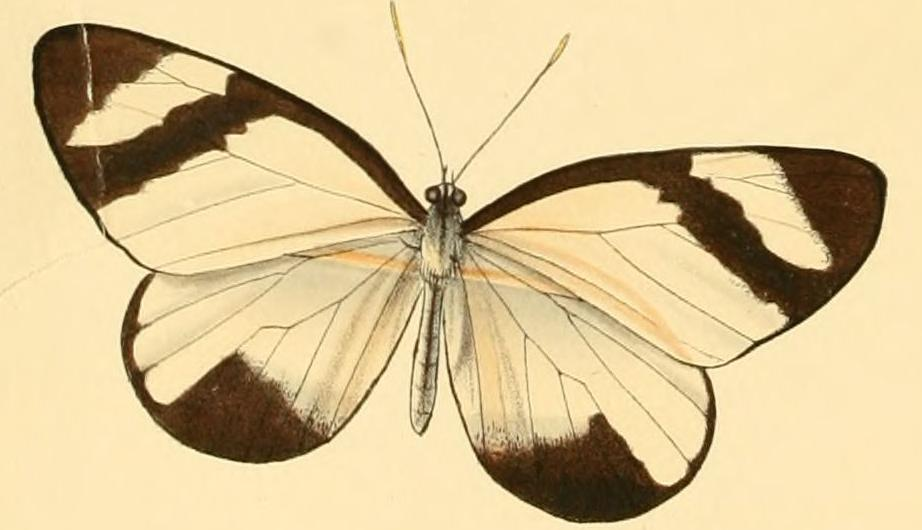

Scientific classification
- Kingdom: Animalia
- Phylum: Arthropoda
- Class: Insecta
- Order: Lepidoptera
- Family: Pieridae
- Genus: Perrhybris
- Species: P. lorena

Binomial name
- Perrhybris lorena (Hewitson, 1852)

Synonyms
- Pieris lorena Hewitson, 1852; Perrhybris lorena jumena Fruhstorfer, 1907; Perrhybris lorena luteifera Fruhstorfer, 1907; Perrhybris lorena peruncta Fruhstorfer, 1908

= Perrhybris lorena =

Species of butterfly

Perrhybris lorena is a butterfly of the family Pieridae. It is found in Ecuador, Peru and Bolivia.
