= Hypsochila =

Scientific classification
- Kingdom: Animalia
- Phylum: Arthropoda
- Clade: Pancrustacea
- Class: Insecta
- Order: Lepidoptera
- Family: Pieridae
- Tribe: Pierini
- Genus: Hypsochila; Ureta, 1955

Species
- See text.

Synonyms
- Chionanema Ureta, 1955

Butterfly genus in family Pieridae

Hypsochila is a Neotropical genus of butterflies in the family Pieridae.

== Species ==
- Hypsochila argyrodice (Staudinger, 1899)
- Hypsochila galactodice Ureta, 1955
- Hypsochila huemul Peña, 1964
- Hypsochila microdice (Blanchard, 1852)
- Hypsochila penai Ureta, 1955
- Hypsochila wagenknechti (Ureta, 1938)
