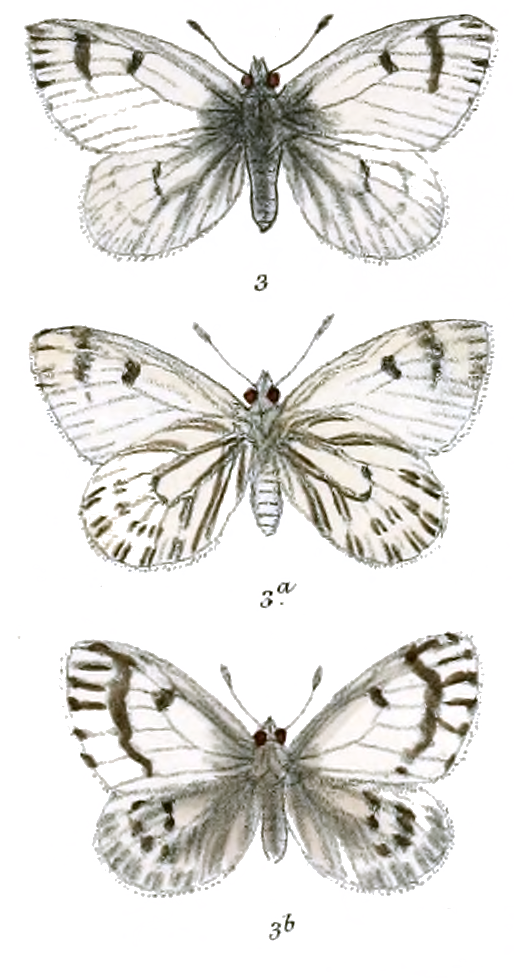

Scientific classification
- Kingdom: Animalia
- Phylum: Arthropoda
- Class: Insecta
- Order: Lepidoptera
- Family: Pieridae
- Genus: Pontia
- Species: P. butleri

Binomial name
- Pontia butleri Alphéraky, 1889

= Pontia butleri =

Butler's dwarf

Species of butterfly

Pontia butleri, the Butler's dwarf, is a small butterfly of the family Pieridae, that is, the yellows and whites. It is found at high altitudes in India and Pakistan.

== Description ==
It closely resembles Pontia shawii, from which it differs as follows: The male has the upperside ground colour as in P. shawii. Forewing has the black markings also more or less similar but altogether smaller and narrower, the terminal series of spots reduced to three or four. Hindwing is similar, but there are two conspicuous black spots on the discocellulars. Underside of the forewing has the ground colour white, veins dusky, costa narrowly and apex suffused with pinkish ochraceous; the discocellular black spot as on the upperside; veins, 4, 5, 6, and apical portion of 7 broadly bordered on each side with black scales that run parallel to but do not touch the veins. Hindwing: ground colour pinkish ochraceous, the veins conspicuously white; all of them, except a small portion in the middle of the discocellulars, bordered, in the manner similar to the veins at the apex of the forewing, with broad lines of black scales on each side.

The female has the upperside similar to the upperside of the female P. shawii, but the wings are irrorated (sprinkled) with black scales only at their bases; the black markings on the forewing are altogether smaller and narrower, and the black curved, outwardly dentate, discal band becomes diffuse and ill-defined posteriorly. On the hindwing the discocellulars are prominently marked with an upper and a lower black spot, and the discal macular band is more conspicuous than in the female P. shawii. Underside precisely as in the male, except that on the forewing the discal black band is seen through by transparency from the upperside. In both sexes the antennae, head, thorax and abdomen as in P. shawii.9

A variety potaxini Alpheraky, is recorded from the Xian-Shan, Koko-Nor, and western China. It differs from the typical form on the upperside, in the male by the restriction and narrowness of the black markings, in the female by the ground colour which is tinged with greenish yellow. On the underside there seems to be scarcely any difference.

The butterfly has a wingspan of 42–54 mm.

== Distribution ==
Found in Ladakh, the Digha pass; 15,000 feet (4,600 m) in Leh; Kardong Pass in the Karakoram and other areas at an altitude of 15,000 to 18,000 feet (4,600 to 5,500 m).
