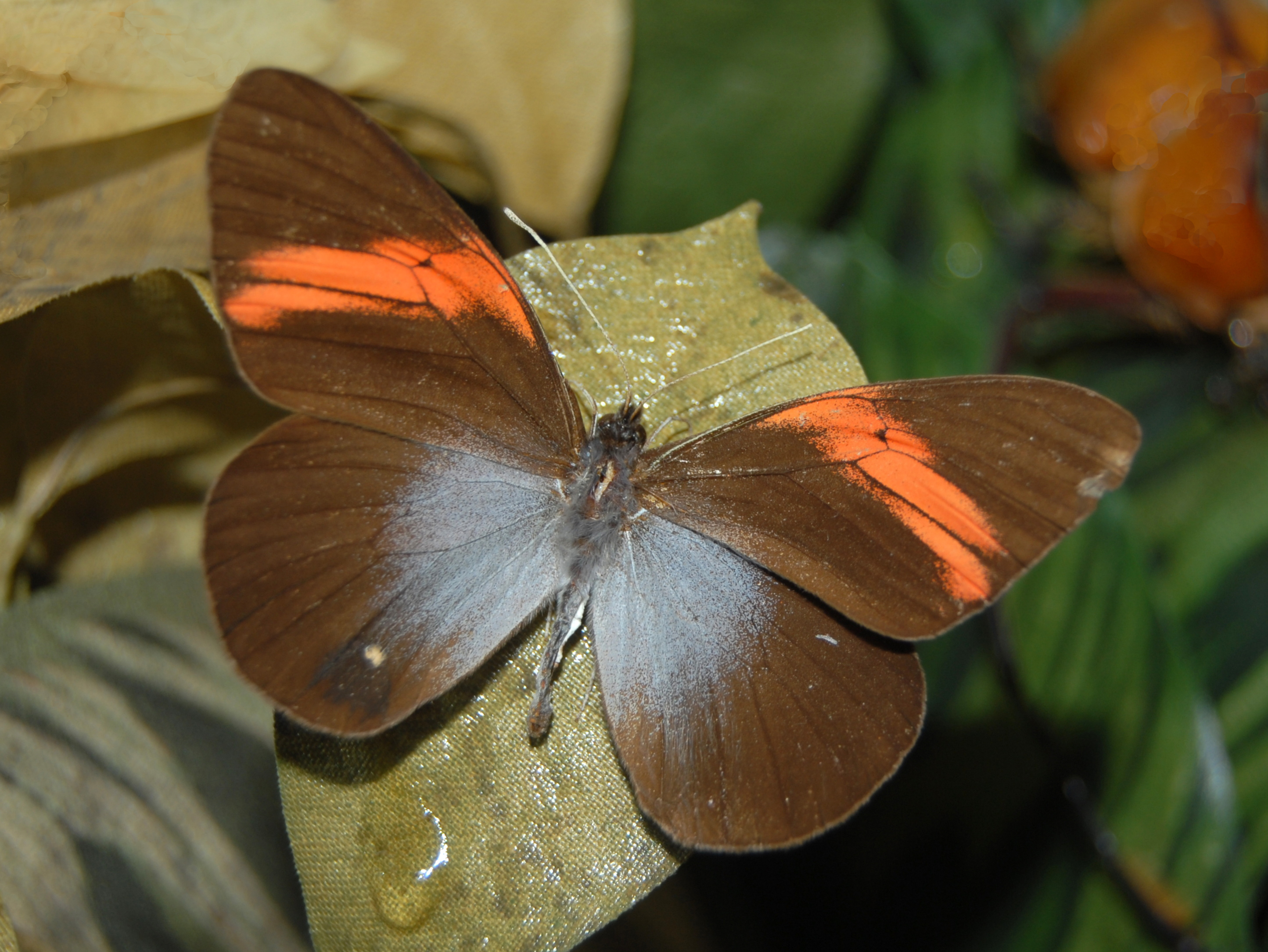
- Pereute leucodrosime, on display at the Museo Civico di Storia Naturale di Milano

Scientific classification
- Kingdom: Animalia
- Phylum: Arthropoda
- Clade: Pancrustacea
- Class: Insecta
- Order: Lepidoptera
- Family: Pieridae
- Genus: Pereute
- Species: P. leucodrosime

Binomial name
- Pereute leucodrosime (Kollar, 1850)

Synonyms
- Euterpe leucodrosime Kollar, 1850; Euterpe latona Butler, 1869

= Pereute leucodrosime =

Species of butterfly

Pereute leucodrosime, the red banded pereute, is a butterfly of the family Pieridae.

== Subspecies ==
Subspecies include:

- Pereute leucodrosime caesarea (Ecuador)
- Pereute leucodrosime leucodrosime (Colombia, Venezuela)
- Pereute leucodrosime beryllina (Ecuador)
- Pereute leucodrosime bellatrix (Peru)

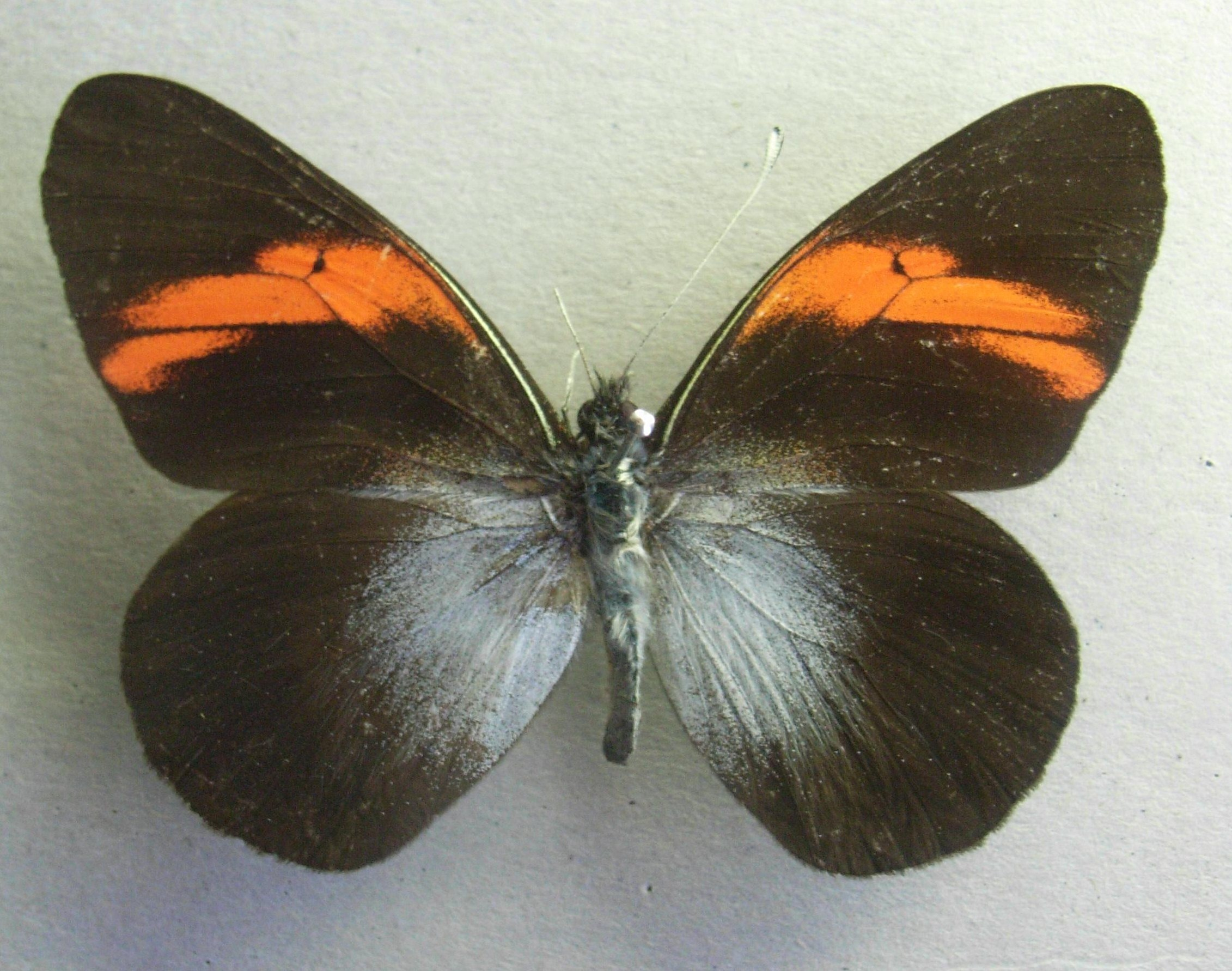
Mounted specimen

== Distribution ==
This species can be found in South America, including Ecuador, Colombia, Bolivia, Venezuela and Peru.

== Habitat ==
These butterflies mainly inhabit valley floor, tree canopy and forest edge.

== Description ==
Pereute leucodrosime has a wingspan of 62–70 mm. This butterfly is basically black, with two orange transversal band on the uppersides of the forewings and a blue basal area on the uppersides of hindwings. The undersides of the hindwings are uniformly blackish, with some red spots close to the base.

== Biology ==
Adults are active in the morning during sunny conditions.
