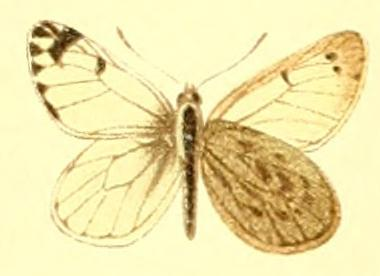
- Pierphulia nysiella

Scientific classification
- Kingdom: Animalia
- Phylum: Arthropoda
- Clade: Pancrustacea
- Class: Insecta
- Order: Lepidoptera
- Family: Pieridae
- Tribe: Pierini
- Genus: Pierphulia; Schaus, 1920

Species
- See text.

= Pierphulia =

Butterfly genus in family Pieridae

Pierphulia is a Neotropical genus of butterflies in the family Pieridae.

== Species ==
- Pierphulia isabela Field & Herrera, 1977
- Pierphulia nysiella (Röber, [1909])
- Pierphulia rosea (Ureta, 1956)
