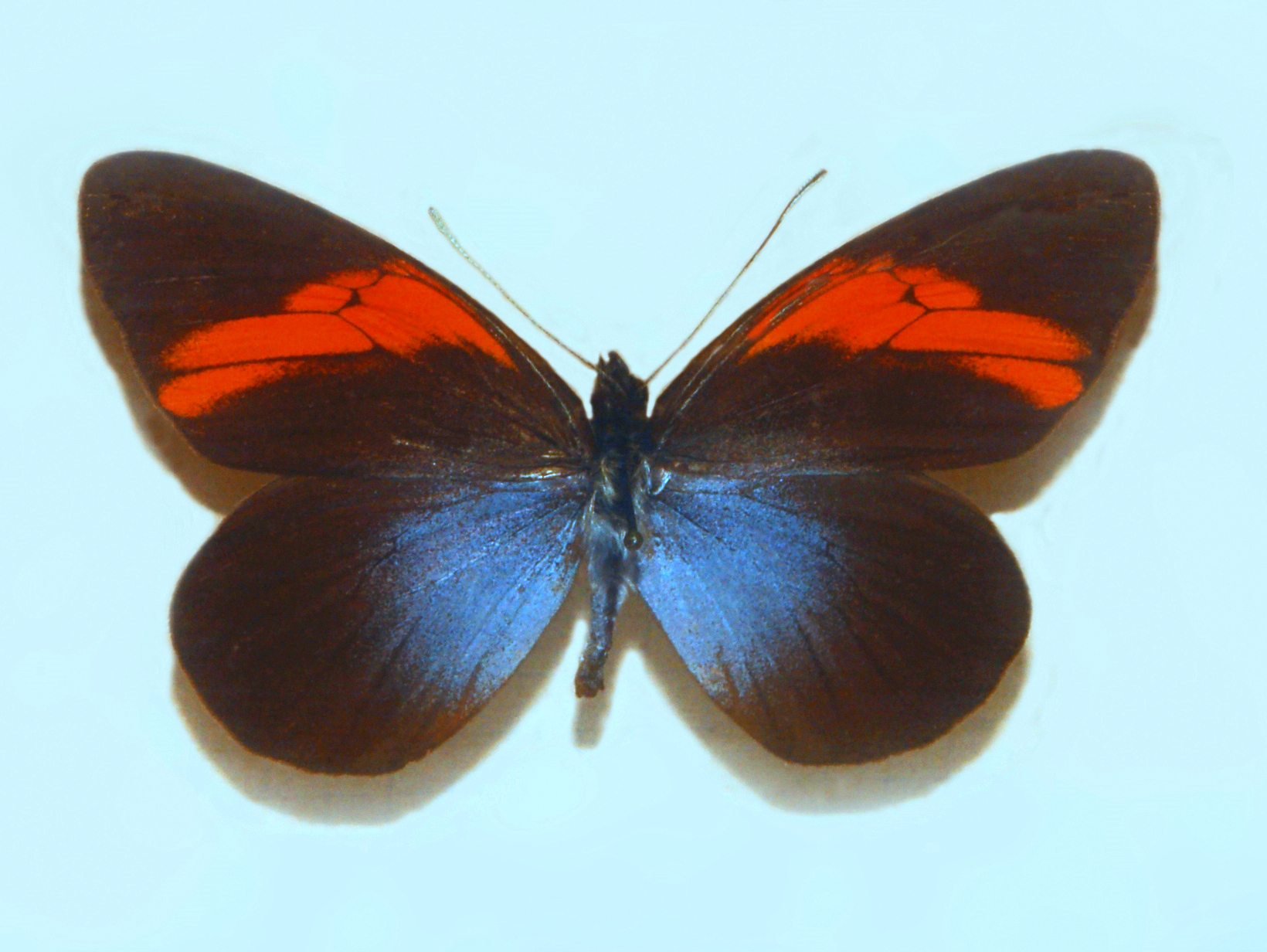
- Mounted Pereute callinira from Peru

Scientific classification
- Kingdom: Animalia
- Phylum: Arthropoda
- Clade: Pancrustacea
- Class: Insecta
- Order: Lepidoptera
- Family: Pieridae
- Tribe: Pierini
- Genus: Pereute; Herrich-Schäffer, 1867

Species
- See text

= Pereute =

Butterfly genus in family Pieridae

Pereute is a Neotropical genus of butterflies in the family Pieridae.

== Species ==
- Pereute antodyca (Boisduval, 1836)
- Pereute callinice (Felder, C & R Felder, 1861)
- Pereute callinira Staudinger, 1884
- Pereute charops (Boisduval, 1836)
- Pereute cheops Staudinger, 1884
- Pereute leucodrosime (Kollar, 1850)
- Pereute lindemannae Reissinger, 1970
- Pereute swainsoni (Gray, 1832)
- Pereute telthusa (Hewitson, 1860)
