= Theochila =

Scientific classification
- Kingdom: Animalia
- Phylum: Arthropoda
- Clade: Pancrustacea
- Class: Insecta
- Order: Lepidoptera
- Family: Pieridae
- Tribe: Pierini
- Genus: Theochila; Field, 1958

Species
- See text

Butterfly genus in family Pieridae

Theochila is a Neotropical genus of butterflies in the family Pieridae.

== Species ==
- Theochila maenacte (Boisduval, 1836)
