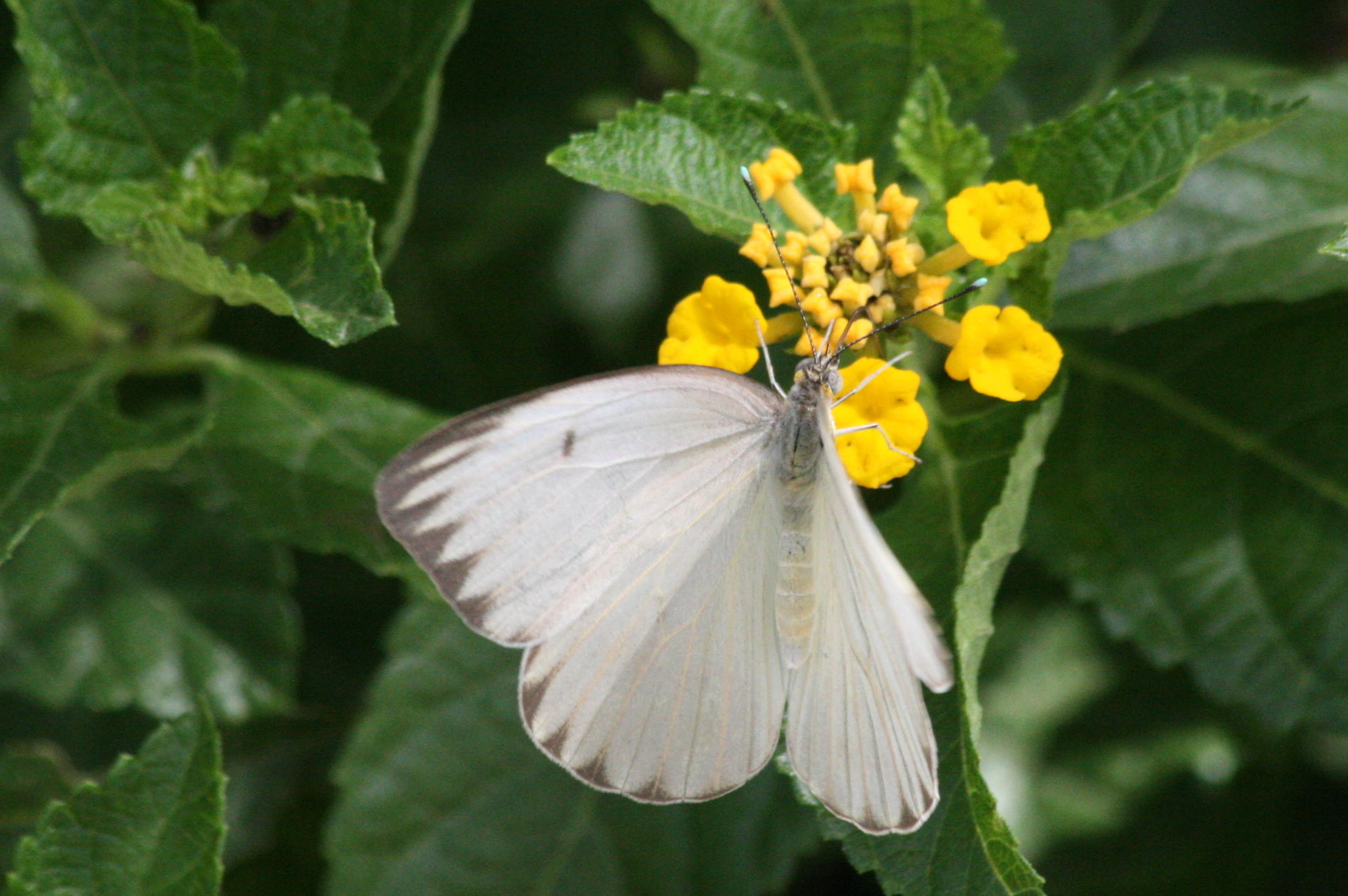
- Dorsal side
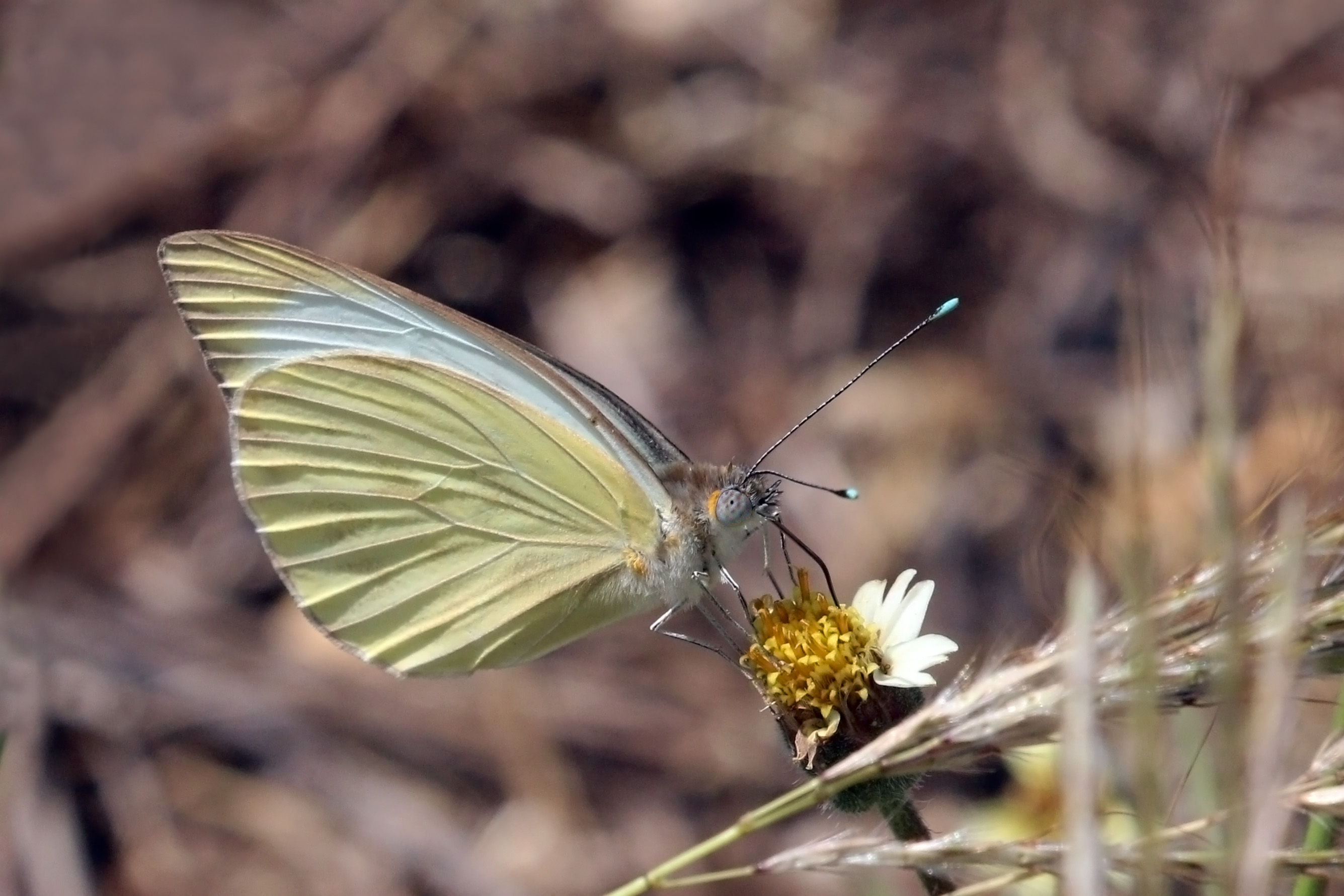
- Ventral side of A. m. eubotea in Grand Cayman

Conservation status
- Secure (NatureServe)

Scientific classification
- Kingdom: Animalia
- Phylum: Arthropoda
- Clade: Pancrustacea
- Class: Insecta
- Order: Lepidoptera
- Family: Pieridae
- Tribe: Pierini
- Genus: Ascia; Scopoli, 1777
- Species: A. monuste

Binomial name
- Ascia monuste (Linnaeus, 1764)

Synonyms
- Papilio monuste Linnaeus, 1764; Synchloë monuste (Linnaeus, 1764); Pontia monuste (Linnaeus, 1764); Cepora heliades Billberg, 1820; Pontia feronia Stephens, 1828; Papilio albusta Sepp, [1851]; Papilio phileta Fabricius, 1775; Pieris cleomes Boisduval & Le Conte, [1830]; Mylothris hemithea Geyer, 1832; Pieris evonima Boisduval, 1836; Pieris vallei Boisduval, 1836; Pieris joppe Boisduval, 1836; Mylothris hippomonuste Hübner, [1819]

= Ascia =

Great southern white

Monotypic butterfly genus

Ascia is a genus of butterflies in the family Pieridae. It is monotypic, being represented by the single species Ascia monuste, commonly known as the great southern white, In this species the sexes may differ with the female being either light or dark colored. It is found from the Atlantic and Gulf coasts of the United States, and south to Argentina. It is migratory along the south-eastern coast of the United States, with strays to Maryland, Kansas, and Colorado.

Larvae have distinct body segments within which there appears to be four to six subsegments. They are purplish-green with two longitudinal, greenish-yellow stripes on each side and the dorsal side. When full-grown, they are approximately one and a quarter inches long. The wingspan in adults is 63–86 mm (2.5–3.4 in). Adults are on wing all year round in southern Texas, peninsular Florida and along the Gulf Coast.

A. monuste is a migrating species that moves in one direction within its life span and does not return. It breeds in Florida but sometimes migrates along the coast up to 160 km (99 mi) to breed in more suitable areas.

== Life history ==
This species seeks out appropriate plant hosts for oviposition by detection of compounds called glucosinolates present in the family Brassicaceae. Adults appear to prefer to lay their eggs on certain areas of the plant. On kale leaves, for example, the preferred regions are the apical, medium and basal parts of the leaves. The average number of eggs laid is about 43 with as many as 245, being laid singly or in clusters. A. m. monuste has been observed feeding on the chorion soon after hatching as their first food, as well as larvae feeding on eggs. It has been suggested that this behavior provides them with extra protein. If a female oviposits on a plant already supporting conspecifics, cannibalism is more likely. Since they have a high growth rate and a non-regulated body temperature, herbivorous insects require a higher quantity of protein. It is questionable that A. monuste is strictly herbivorous as they often consume conspecific eggs. Larvae have been seen consuming whole eggs from the same clutch or others nearby on the same leaf. This behavior appears to be advantageous from an evolutionary stand point as this is an opportunistic behavior and can increase fitness.

In general, the development time for eggs ranges from 4–5 days in field conditions and 3.4 days in laboratory conditions. The developmental time for the larvae and pupae ranges between subspecies from 11.0–17.4 days for the first five instars for A. m. orseis, and 6.1–9.56 days for A. m. monuste. Pupation can be from 5.9 to 10 days long, and adults can live 4.3–5 days for males and 8–10 days for females.

The larvae, known in Brazil as cabbage caterpillars or kale caterpillars, feed on Brassicaceae (including Cakile maritima, cultivated cabbage and radish and Lepidium species) and plants in the family Capparidaceae, including nasturtium. Chemical characteristics of the plant that affect the development of the larvae include the: nitrogen content, carbohydrates and water content, as well as physical characteristics such as: hardness, size, form, texture, temporal and spatial distribution and abundance. Nitrogen is required for the production of protein during the early instars.

Newly hatched larvae will remain on a single plant, as they are not very mobile. After the 5th instar, they are more mobile and can move to another plant. Larvae dispersion appears to occur in a random fashion, so in order for the larvae to be successful, the plants need to be close together for them to find another plant. Intraspecific competition between larvae generally doesn't occur between the 1st and 2nd instars because they do not consume a lot. Competition may become a problem once they hatch into the final three instars. Adults feed on nectar from various flowers including saltwort, lantana, and verbena. It is a sporadic pest of crucifer vegetables in southern Texas.

== Pest species of Brassicaceae ==
Damage to the plant is caused by the larvae that, upon hatching, feed on the leaves for almost the entirety of their developmental cycle. This can be so damaging, that up to 100% of the entire crop can be lost. One method of decreasing this damage is by the use of pesticides. These, however can be detrimental to human health as well as the environment. Another method that is being explored is the use of host plant resistance, which is safer and more sustainable. Resistant crops are becoming increasingly popular as pesticides have quite a few drawbacks. Resistance can be seen as antixenosis, tolerance and antibiosis.

== Subspecies ==
- Ascia monuste monuste (southern United States to Suriname)
- Ascia monuste phileta (southeastern United States, northern Bahamas)
- Ascia monuste virginia (Lesser Antilles between Virgin Islands and St. Vincent)
- Ascia monuste eubotea (Greater Antilles, Virgin Islands)
- Ascia monuste orseis (Brazil)
- Ascia monuste suasa (Peru)
- Ascia monuste automate (Argentina)
- Ascia monuste raza (Baja California Sur)

== Gallery ==
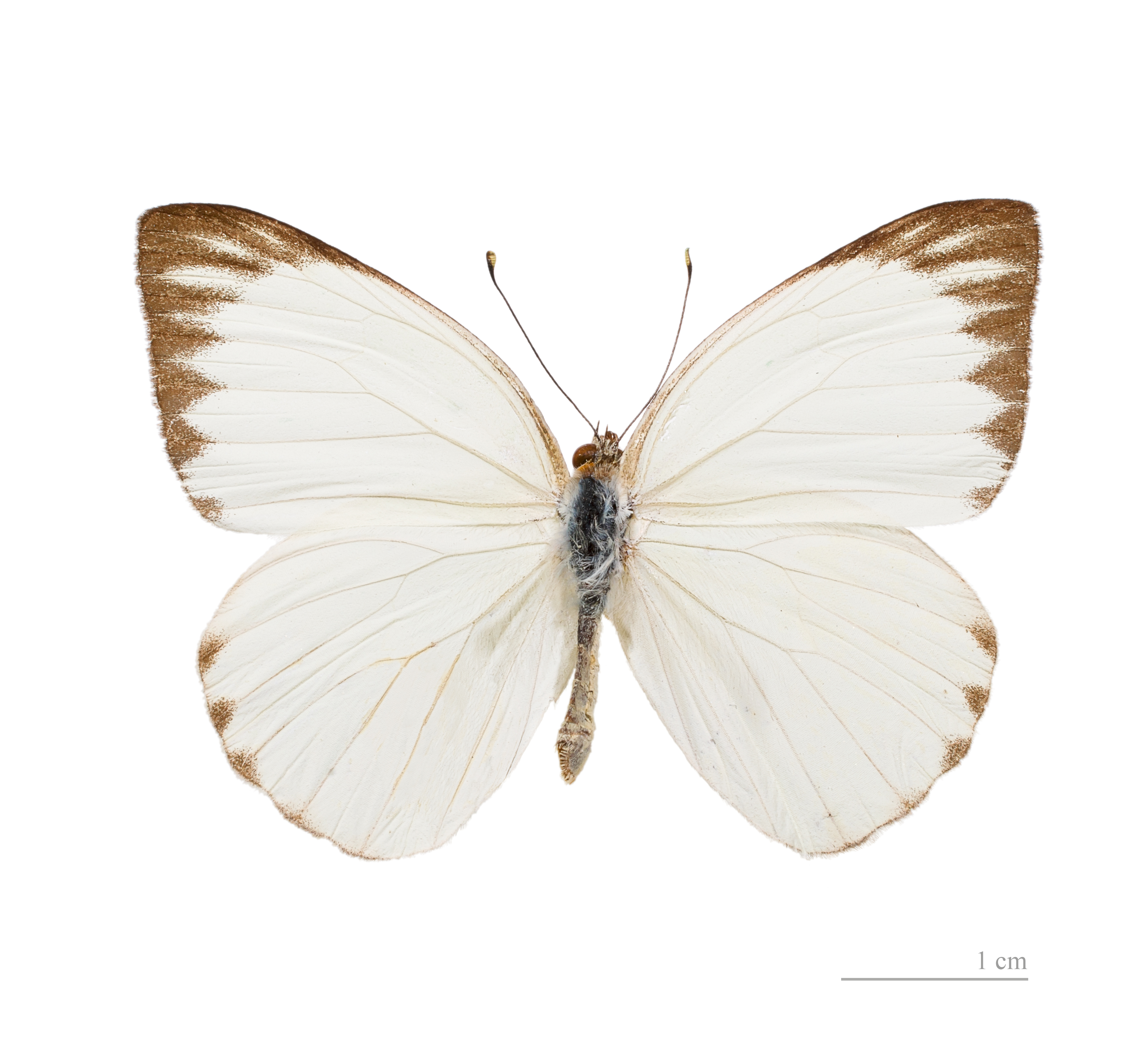
Dorsal view

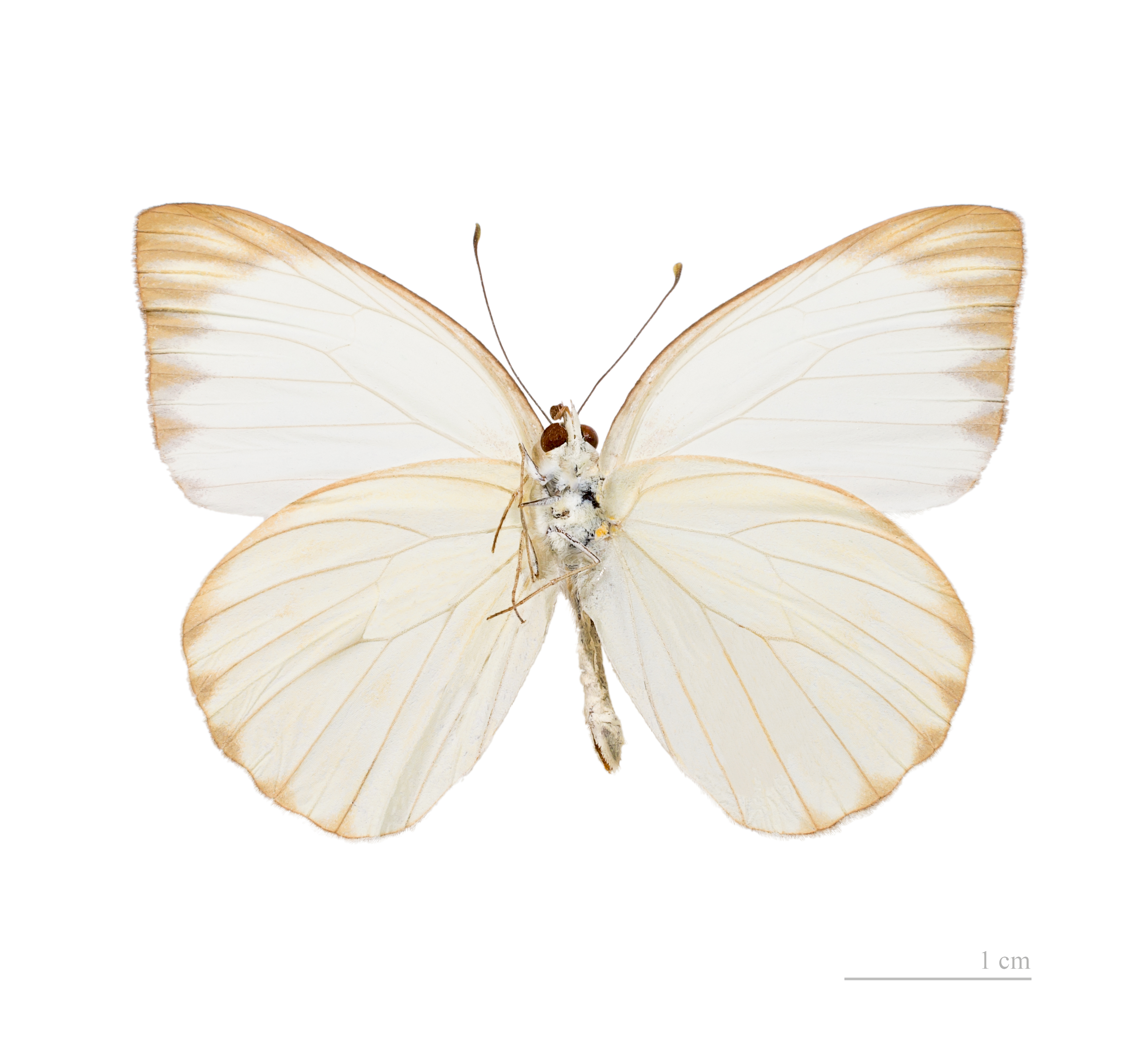
Ventral view

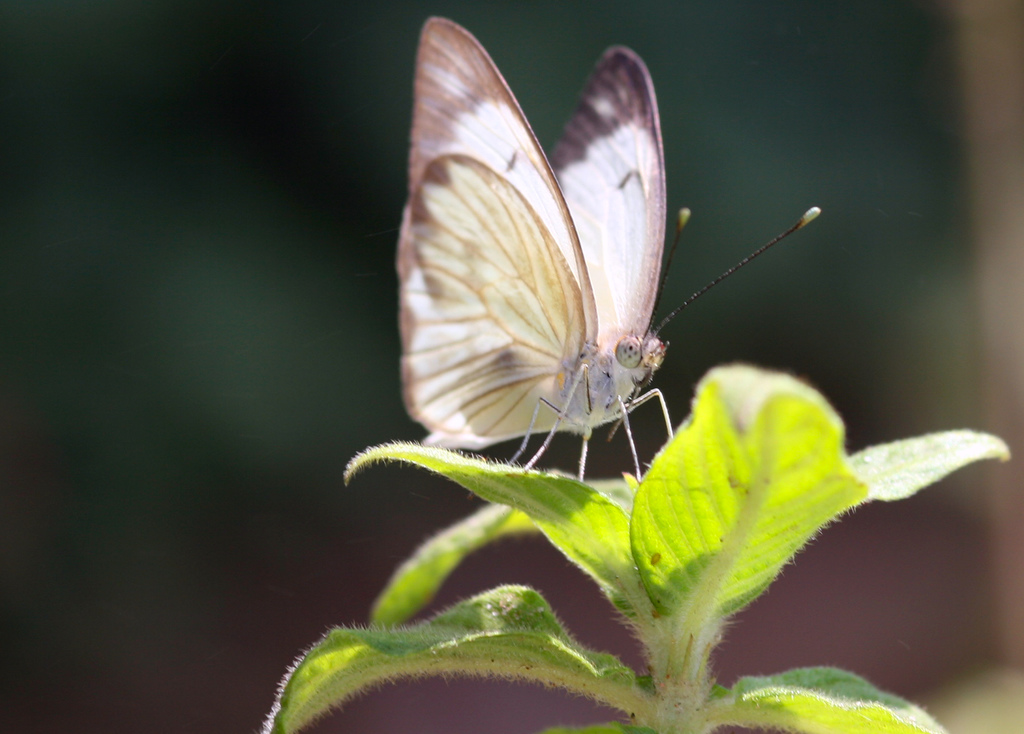
