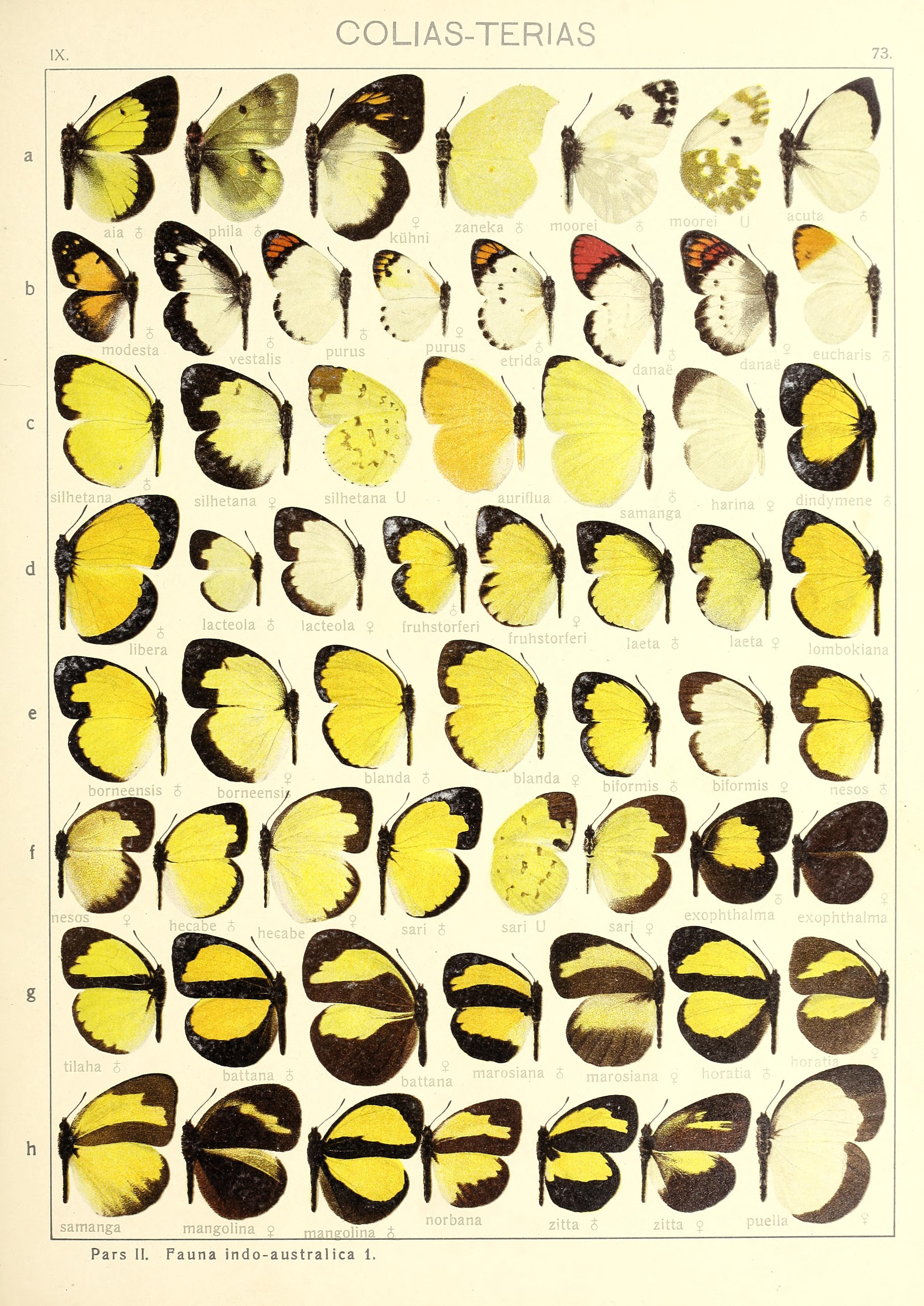
- in Seitz a

Scientific classification
- Kingdom: Animalia
- Phylum: Arthropoda
- Clade: Pancrustacea
- Class: Insecta
- Order: Lepidoptera
- Family: Pieridae
- Tribe: Pierini
- Genus: Leuciacria; Rothschild & Jordan, 1905

Species
- See text

= Leuciacria =

Butterfly genus in family Pieridae

Leuciacria is a genus of butterflies in the family Pieridae.

The under surface of the forewing is slightly glossy and the cell of the forewing almost imperceptibly tinged with yellow. Hindwing as in most Elodina (from which it differs in the broader, shorter cell of both wings and in the second subcostal vein arising before the apex of the cell of the forewing) with yellow, sharply defined costal margin. The black apical margin of the upper surface is feebly transparent. Leuciacria acuta was discovered by Albert Stewart Meek at an elevation of over 6000 ft. in British New Guinea.

== Species ==
- Leuciacria acuta Rothschild & Jordan, 1905 – New Guinea
- Leuciacria olivei Müller, C, 1999 – New Ireland
