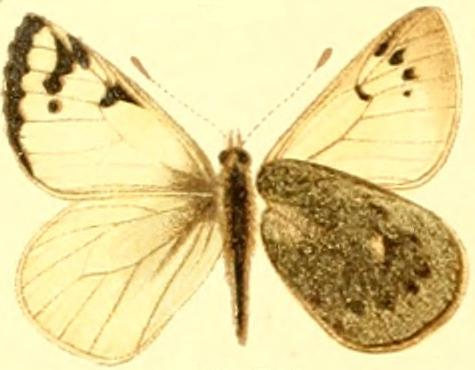
- Piercolias huanaco

Scientific classification
- Kingdom: Animalia
- Phylum: Arthropoda
- Clade: Pancrustacea
- Class: Insecta
- Order: Lepidoptera
- Family: Pieridae
- Tribe: Pierini
- Genus: Piercolias; Grote, 1903

Species
- See text

Synonyms
- Trifurcula Staudinger, 1894 (preocc. Trifurcula Stainton, 1846, Trifurcula Zeller, 1848); Andina Staudinger, 1895; Andina Röber, [1909]

= Piercolias =

Butterfly genus in family Pieridae

Piercolias is a Neotropical genus of butterflies in the family Pieridae. The name Piercolias was introduced by Augustus Radcliffe Grote as a replacement for Trifurcula Staudinger, 1894, which is invalid under the Principle of Homonymy.

== Species ==
- Piercolias coropunae (Dyar, 1913)
- Piercolias forsteri Field & Herrera, 1977
- Piercolias huanaco (Staudinger, 1894)
