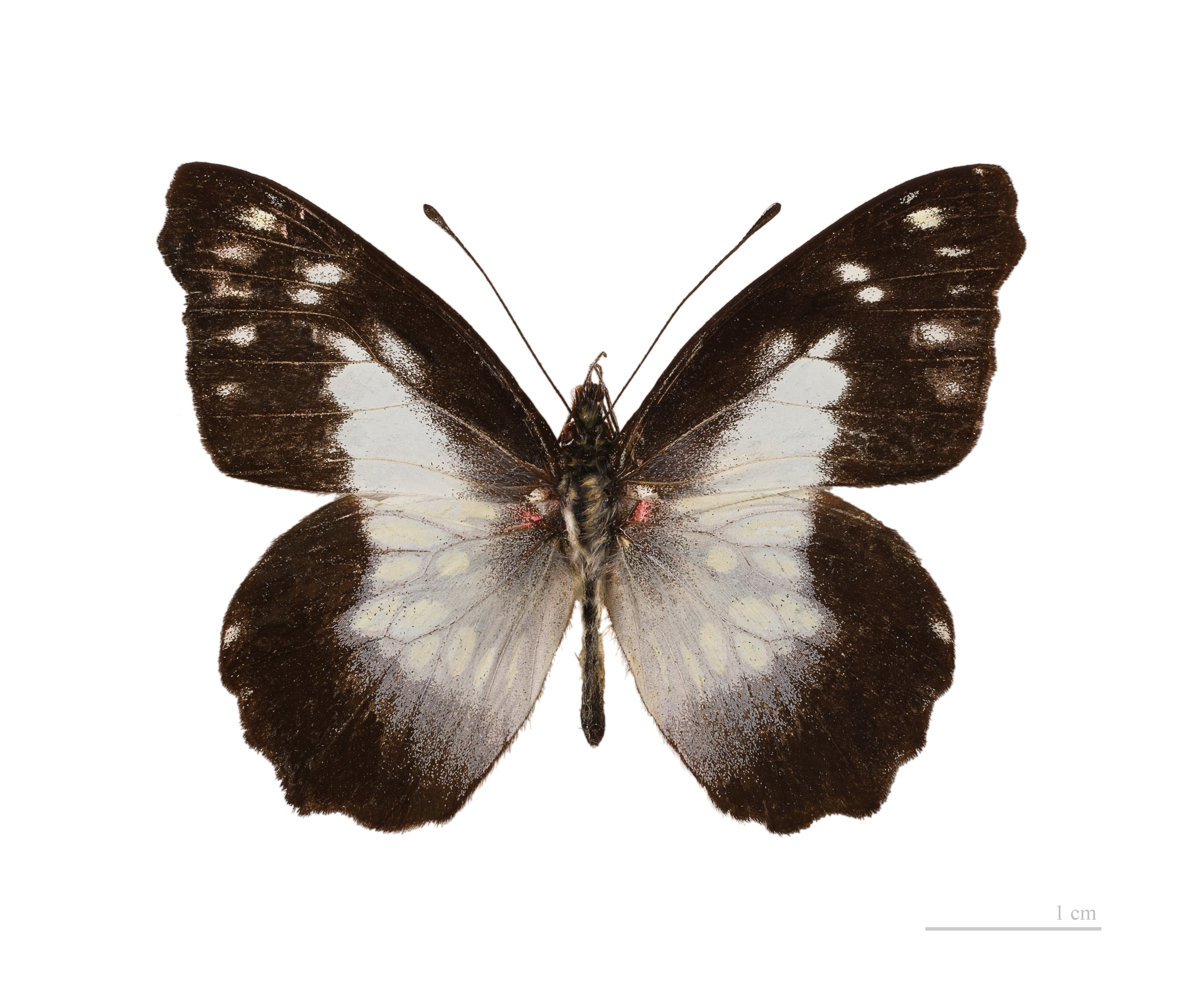
- Leodonta tellane

Scientific classification
- Kingdom: Animalia
- Phylum: Arthropoda
- Clade: Pancrustacea
- Class: Insecta
- Order: Lepidoptera
- Family: Pieridae
- Tribe: Pierini
- Genus: Leodonta; Butler, 1870

Species
- See text

= Leodonta =

Butterfly genus in family Pieridae

Leodonta is a Neotropical genus of butterflies in the family Pieridae.

== Species ==
- Leodonta dysoni (Doubleday, 1847)
- Leodonta tagaste (Felder, C & R Felder, 1859)
- Leodonta tellane (Hewitson, 1860)
- Leodonta zenobia (Felder, C & R Felder, 1865)
- Leodonta zenobina (Hopffer, 1869)
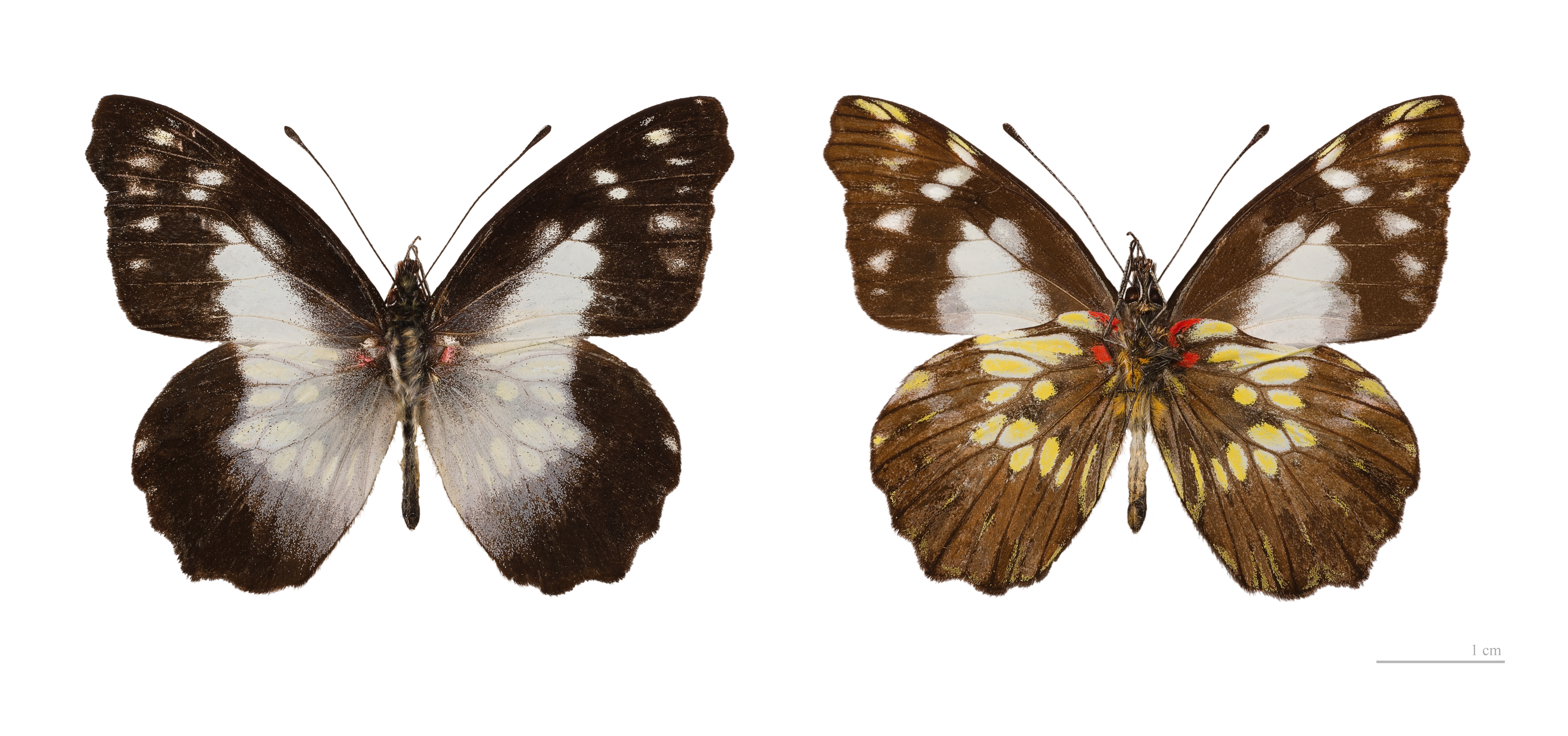
Leodonta tellane chiriquensis
