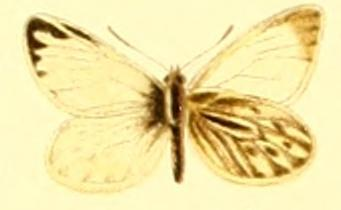
- Infraphulia illimani

Scientific classification
- Kingdom: Animalia
- Phylum: Arthropoda
- Clade: Pancrustacea
- Class: Insecta
- Order: Lepidoptera
- Family: Pieridae
- Tribe: Pierini
- Genus: Infraphulia; Field, 1958

Species
- See text.

= Infraphulia =

Butterfly genus in family Pieridae

Infraphulia is a Neotropical genus of butterflies in the family Pieridae.

== Species ==
- Infraphulia illimani (Weymer, 1890)
- Infraphulia ilyodes (Ureta, 1955)
- Infraphulia madeleinea Field & Herrera, 1977
