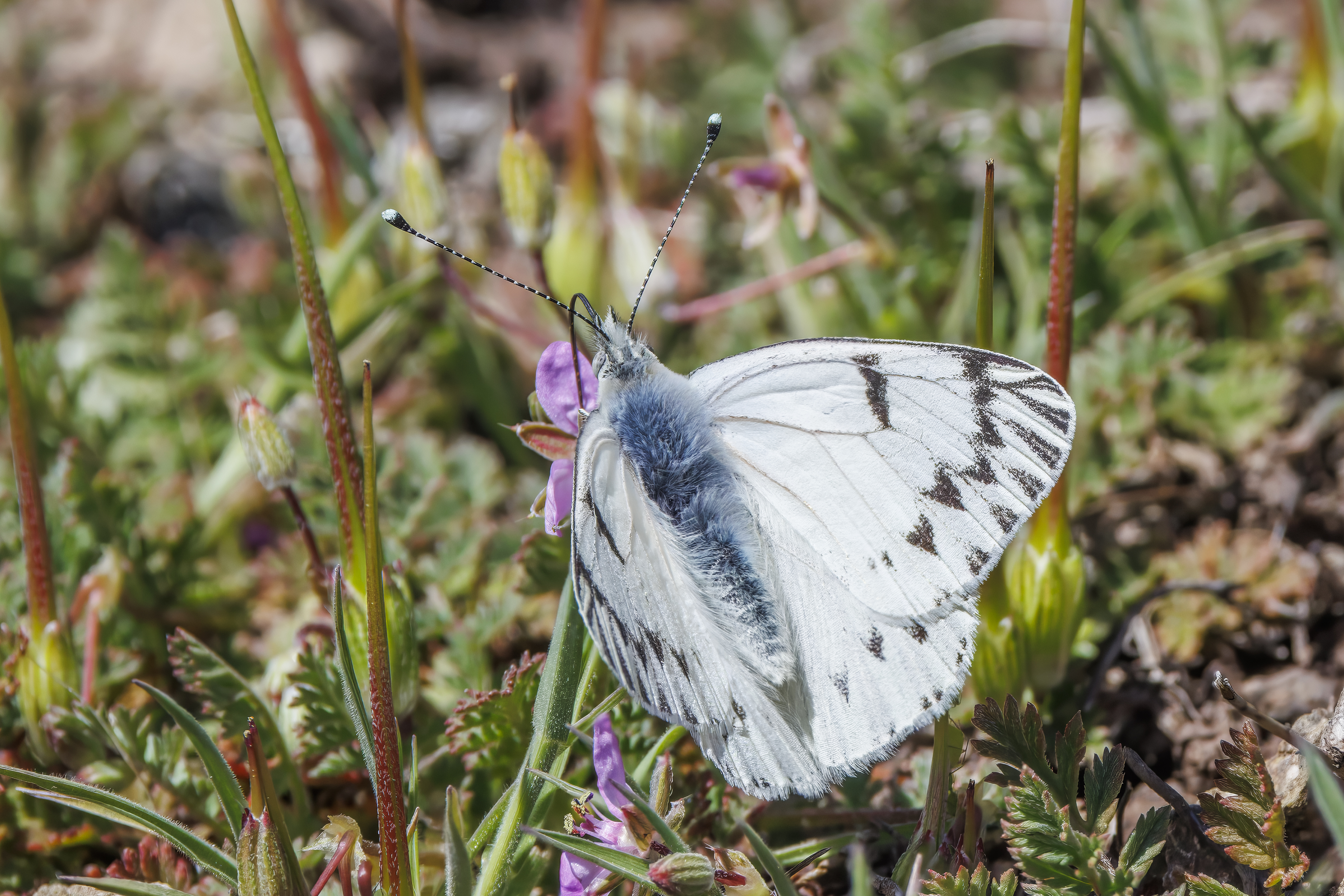
- T. autodice blanchardii Andes near santiago, Chile

Scientific classification
- Kingdom: Animalia
- Phylum: Arthropoda
- Clade: Pancrustacea
- Class: Insecta
- Order: Lepidoptera
- Family: Pieridae
- Tribe: Pierini
- Genus: Tatochila; Butler, 1870

Species
- See text.

= Tatochila =

Butterfly genus in family Pieridae

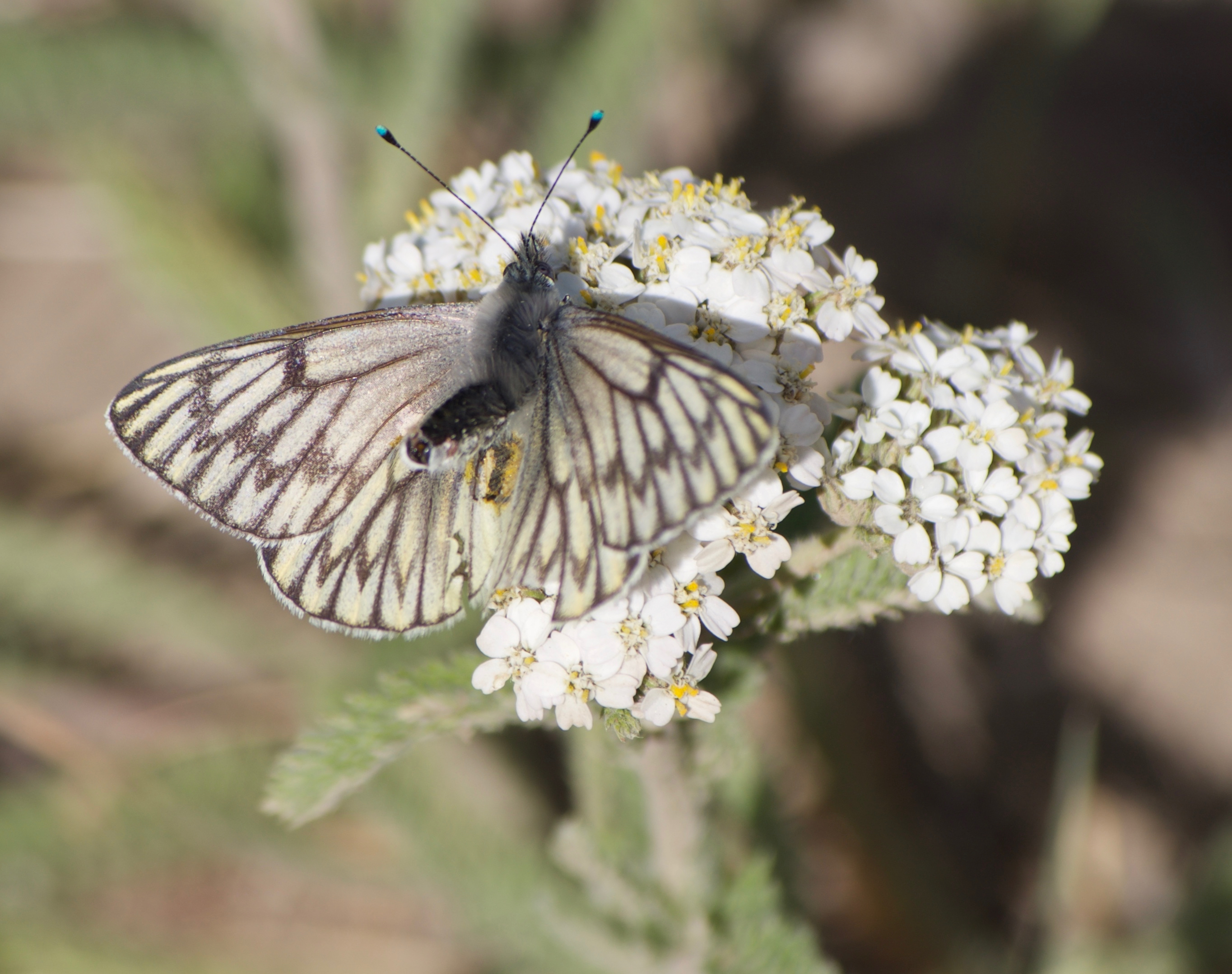
T. Theodice

Tatochila is a Neotropical genus of butterflies in the family Pieridae.

== Species ==
- Tatochila autodice (Hübner, 1818)
- Tatochila distincta Jörgensen, 1916
- Tatochila homoeodice Paravicini, 1910
- Tatochila inversa Hayward, 1949
- Tatochila mariae Herrera, 1970
- Tatochila mercedis (Eschscholtz, 1821)
- Tatochila orthodice (Weymer, 1890)
- Tatochila sagittata Röber, 1908
- Tatochila stigmadice (Staudinger, 1894)
- Tatochila theodice (Boisduval, 1832)
- Tatochila xanthodice (Lucas, 1852)
