= Glennia =

Scientific classification
- Kingdom: Animalia
- Phylum: Arthropoda
- Class: Insecta
- Order: Lepidoptera
- Family: Pieridae
- Tribe: Pierini
- Genus: Glennia; Klots, 1933

Species
- See text

Monotypic butterfly genus in family Pieridae

Glennia is a monotypic, Neotropical, genus of butterflies in the family Pieridae. Its sole species is Glennia pylotis (Godart, 1819).
