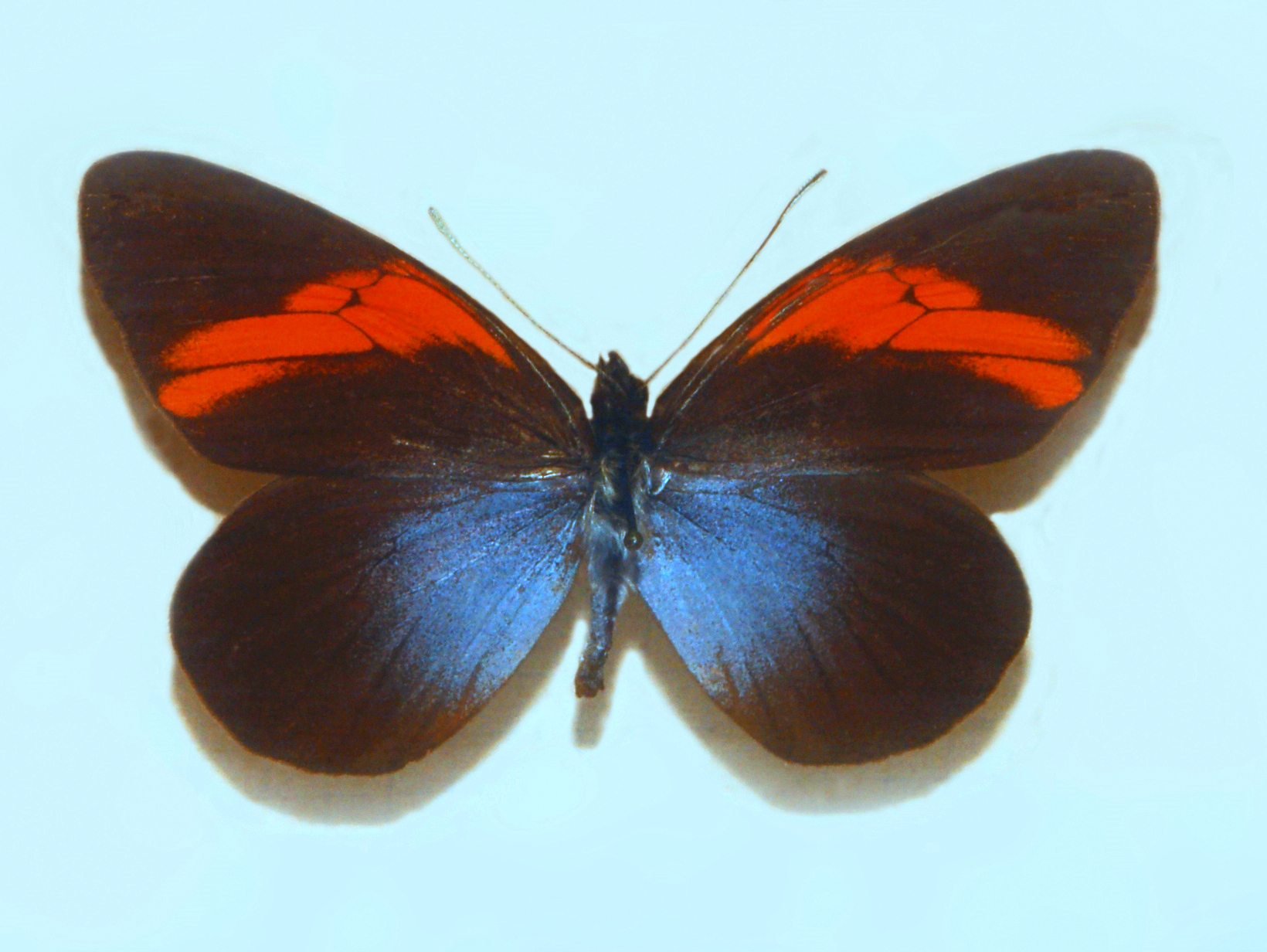
- Mounted specimen from Peru

Scientific classification
- Kingdom: Animalia
- Phylum: Arthropoda
- Class: Insecta
- Order: Lepidoptera
- Family: Pieridae
- Genus: Pereute
- Species: P. callinira

Binomial name
- Pereute callinira Staudinger, 1884

Synonyms
- Pereute callinira numatia Fruhstorfer, 1907; Pereute callinira ecuadorensis Joicey & Talbot, 1928; Pereute leucodrosime bellatrix f. sinemacula Bryk, 1953; Pereute callinira f. pallida Reissinger, 1970

= Pereute callinira =

Species of butterfly

Pereute callinira is a butterfly of the family Pieridae.

== Description ==
Pereute callinira has a wingspan of about 65–70 millimetres (2.6–2.8 in). The basic colour of the wings is black or dark brown. The uppersides of the forewings are crossed by a red band, while the basal area of the hindwings is blue. The undersides of the wings are uniformly blackish. Larvae feed on Nectandra species (Lauraceae).

== Distribution ==
This species can be found in Peru, Colombia, Bolivia and Ecuador.

== Subspecies ==
- Pereute callinira callinira (Peru, Colombia, Bolivia, Ecuador)
- Pereute callinira sabrina Fruhstorfer, 1907 (Colombia)
