= Reliquia =

Scientific classification
- Kingdom: Animalia
- Phylum: Arthropoda
- Clade: Pancrustacea
- Class: Insecta
- Order: Lepidoptera
- Family: Pieridae
- Tribe: Pierini
- Genus: Reliquia; Ackery, 1975

Species
- See text.

Butterfly genus in family Pieridae

Reliquia is a Neotropical genus of butterflies in the family Pieridae.

== Species ==
- Reliquia santamarta Ackery, 1975
