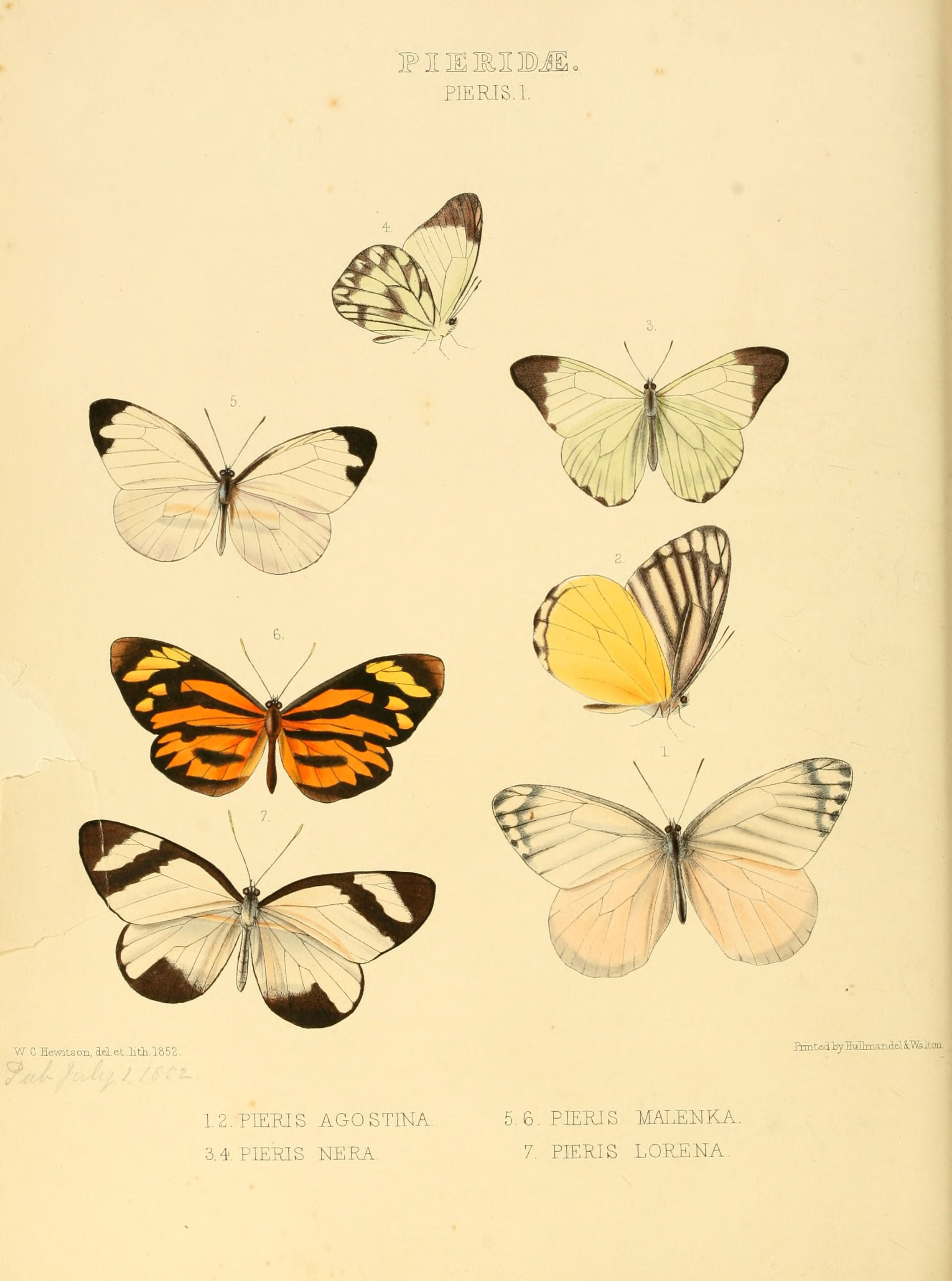
- Figures 5 (male) and 6 (female) Perrhybris pamela Figure 7 Perrhybris lorena

Scientific classification
- Kingdom: Animalia
- Phylum: Arthropoda
- Clade: Pancrustacea
- Class: Insecta
- Order: Lepidoptera
- Family: Pieridae
- Tribe: Pierini
- Genus: Perrhybris; Hübner, [1819]

Species
- See text

= Perrhybris =

Butterfly genus in family Pieridae

Perrhybris is a neotropical genus of butterflies in the family Pieridae.

== Species ==
- Perrhybris lorena (Hewitson, 1852)
- Perrhybris lypera (Kollar, 1850)
- Perrhybris pamela (Stoll, 1780)
