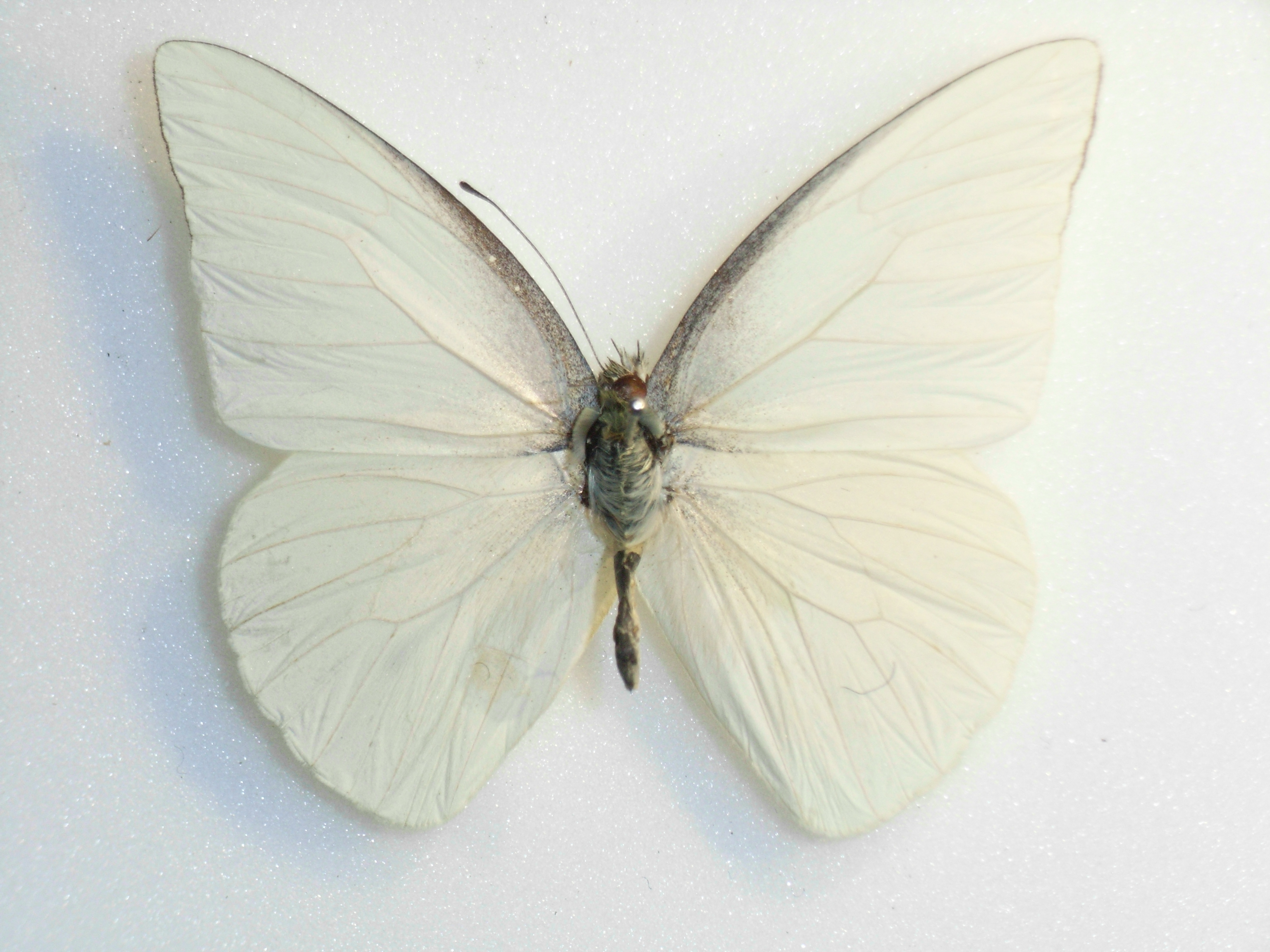

Scientific classification
- Kingdom: Animalia
- Phylum: Arthropoda
- Clade: Pancrustacea
- Class: Insecta
- Order: Lepidoptera
- Family: Pieridae
- Genus: Saletara
- Species: S. liberia

Binomial name
- Saletara liberia (Cramer, [1779])

Synonyms
- Papilio liberia Cramer, [1779]; Pieris panda Godart, [1819]; Saletara panda; Saletara panda distanti Butler, 1898; Pieris sulphurea Vollenhoven, 1865

= Saletara liberia =

Species of butterfly

Saletara liberia is a butterfly of the family Pieridae. It is found in Indonesia, the Philippines, Peninsular Malaysia and various islands in the region. Subspecies S. l. distanti is known by the common name Malaysian albatross.

== Subspecies ==
"Western-group"

- S. l. aurifolia Fruhstorfer, 1904 – Indonesia: (West Sumatra: Mentawai Islands) (?Batu Isl. in Savela)
- S. l. chrysea Fruhstorfer, 1903 – India (Nicobars)
- S. l. distanti Butler, 1898 – Malaysia (Peninsular Malaya), Thailand, Singapore, Indonesia (Sumatra, Borneo)
- S. l. engania Fruhstorfer, 1903 – Indonesia (West Sumatra: Enggano)
- S. l. natunensis Cowan, 1955 – Indonesia (Riau Islands: Natuna-besar Island)
- S. l. panda (Godart, 1819) – Indonesia (Java)
- S. l. schoenbergi Semper, 1891 – Indonesia (West Sumatra: Nias, later Simeulue)
- S. l. substriata van Eecke, 1913 – Indonesia: (West Sumatra: Simeulue/ adjacent Pulau Babi)

Lesser Sunda Islands

- S. l. balina (Fruhstorfer, 1908) – Indonesia (Lesser Sunda Islands: Bali)
- S. l. dohertyi Cowan, 1955 – Indonesia (Lesser Sunda Islands: Sumbawa)

Japan (far South)

- S. l. iwasakii Sonan, 1932 Japan (Yaeyama Islands: Ishigaki)

Philippines

- S. l. erebina Fruhstorfer, 1900 – Philippines (Palawan)
- S. l. hostilia Fruhstorfer, 1910 – Philippines (Balabac) [Syn?]
- S. l. nathalia (C. & R. Felder, 1862) – Philippines (Luzon) [panthea?]
- S. l. martia Fruhstorfer, 1910 – Philippines (Basilan and Mindanao)

Sulawesi

- S. l. nigerrima Holland, 1891 – Indonesia (Sulawesi)
- S. p. watanabei Detani, 1983 – Indonesia (Sulawesi: Kep. Banggai (Peleng))

Maluku Islands

- S. l. aurantiaca (Staudinger, 1895) – Indonesia: Maluku Islands (Mangoli/Sula Island)
- S. l. chrysoberylla Fruhstorfer, 1910 – Indonesia: Maluku Islands (Buru)
- S. l. eliada (Hewitson, 1861) – Indonesia: Maluku Islands (Batchian)
- S. l. liberia (Cramer, [1779]) – Indonesia: Maluku Islands (Ambon, Serang)
- S. l. obina Fruhstorfer, 1904 – Indonesia: Maluku Islands (Obi)

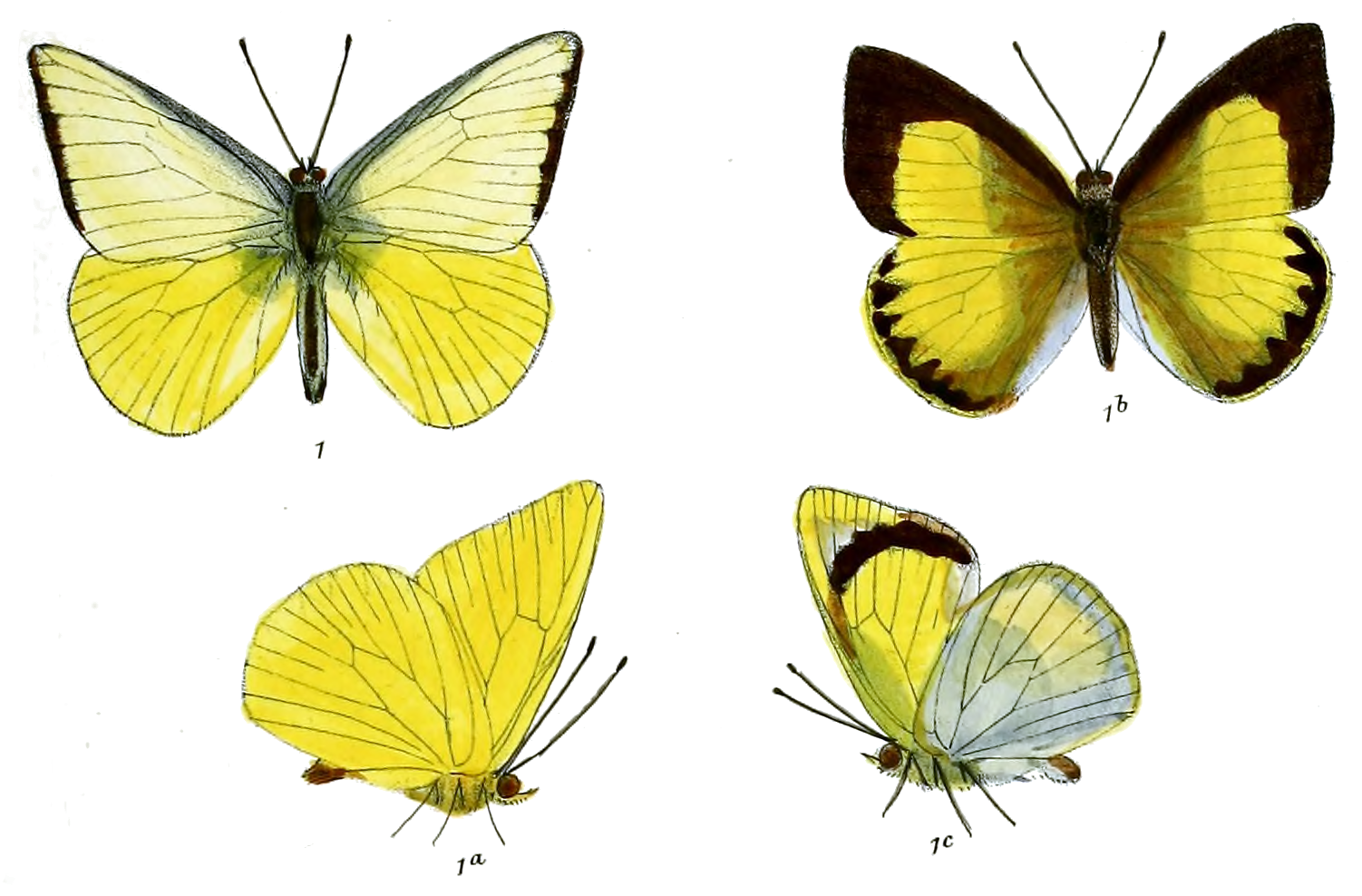
S. l. chrysaea
