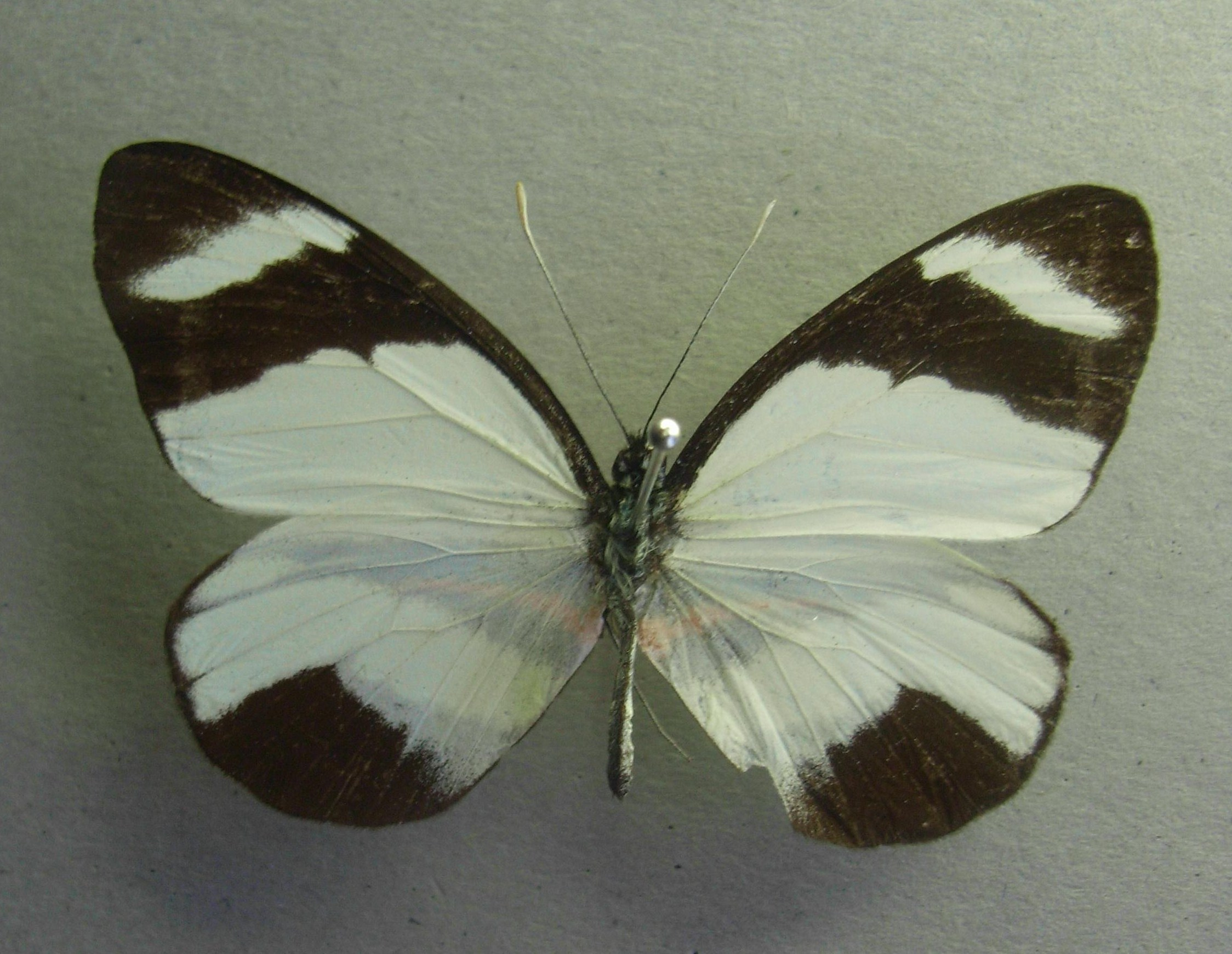
- Upperside of male
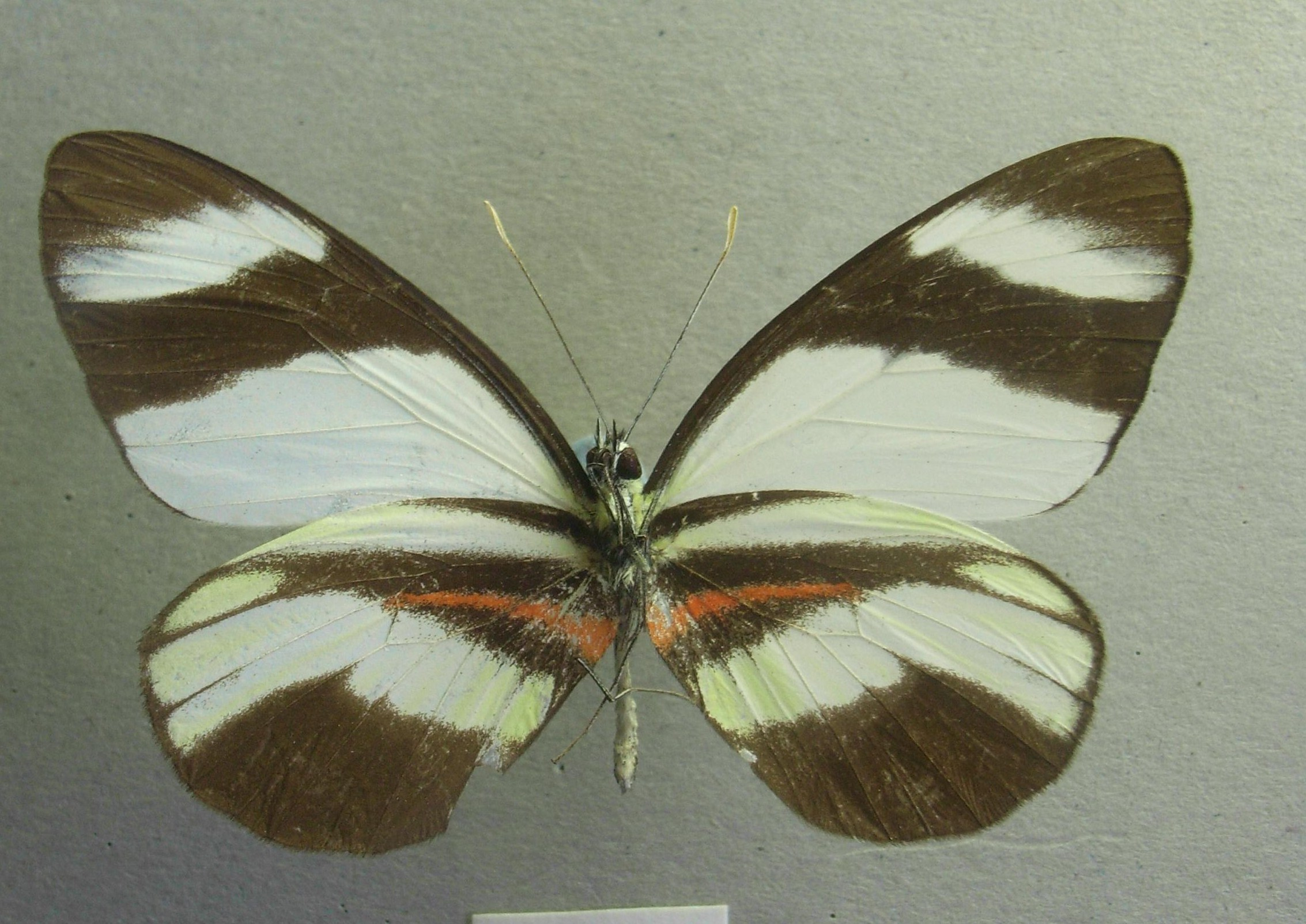
- Underside of male

Scientific classification
- Kingdom: Animalia
- Phylum: Arthropoda
- Class: Insecta
- Order: Lepidoptera
- Family: Pieridae
- Genus: Perrhybris
- Species: P. pamela

Binomial name
- Perrhybris pamela (Stoll, [1870])

Synonyms
- Papilio pyrrha Fabricius, 1775; Papilio iphigenia Schulze, 1776 (preocc. Cramer, 1775); Perrhybris eueidias Hübner, [1819]; Mylothris alethina Butler, 1872; Perrhybris ostrolenka Staudinger, 1884; Pieris alethina; Pieris malenka Hewitson, 1852

= Perrhybris pamela =

Pamela

Species of butterfly

Perrhybris pamela, the Pamela, is a butterfly of the family Pieridae. It is found from Mexico, Honduras, El Salvador, Costa Rica and Panama, south to Colombia, Venezuela, Suriname, French Guiana, Brazil, Ecuador, Peru, and Bolivia. This species breeds in lowland rainforest at altitudes between sea level and about 900 metres.

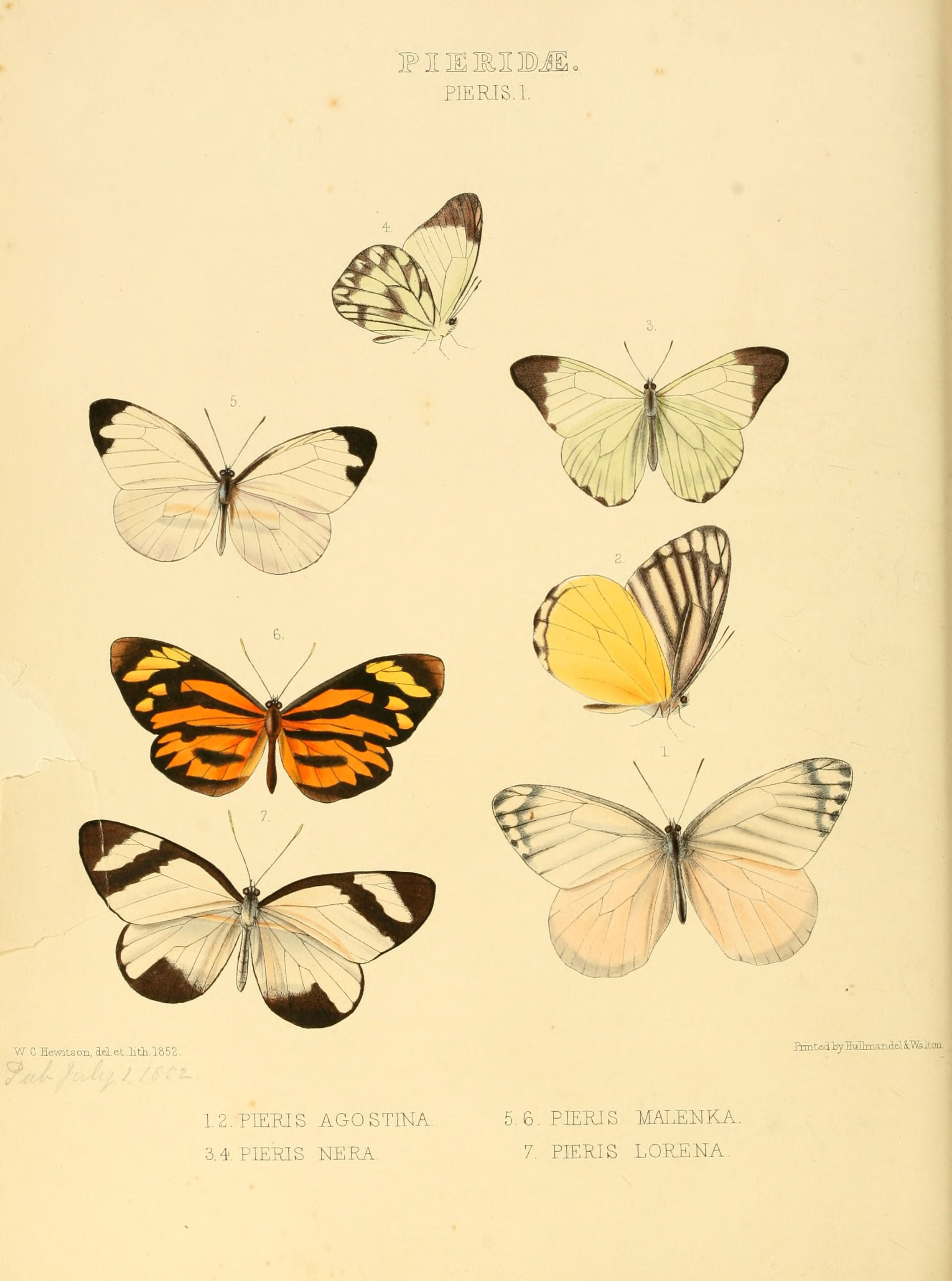
Figures 5 (male) and 6 (female)

The wingspan is 66–70 mm (2.6–2.8 in). It is strongly sexually dichromatic, with the female resembling some species of Heliconiini.

Larvae have been recorded on Capparis isthmensis and Capparis pittieri.

== Subspecies ==
- P. p. pamela (Suriname)
- P. p. eleidias (Brazil (Espírito Santo, São Paulo))
- P. p. malenka (Venezuela)
- P. p. alethina (Costa Rica, Panama)
- P. p. flava
- P. p. bogotana (Colombia)
- P. p. amazonica (Peru)
- P. p. glessaria (Ecuador)
- P. p. carmenta (Peru, Bolivia)
- P. p. incisa (Brazil (Bahia))
- P. p. lucasi (French Guiana)
- P. p. fruhstorferi (Panama)
- P. p. boyi (Brazil (Amazonas))
- P. p. chajulensis (Mexico, Honduras)
- P. p. mapa (Mexico)
- P. p. bertha (Peru)
- P. p. mazuka (Peru)

There is also an undescribed subspecies from Costa Rica.
