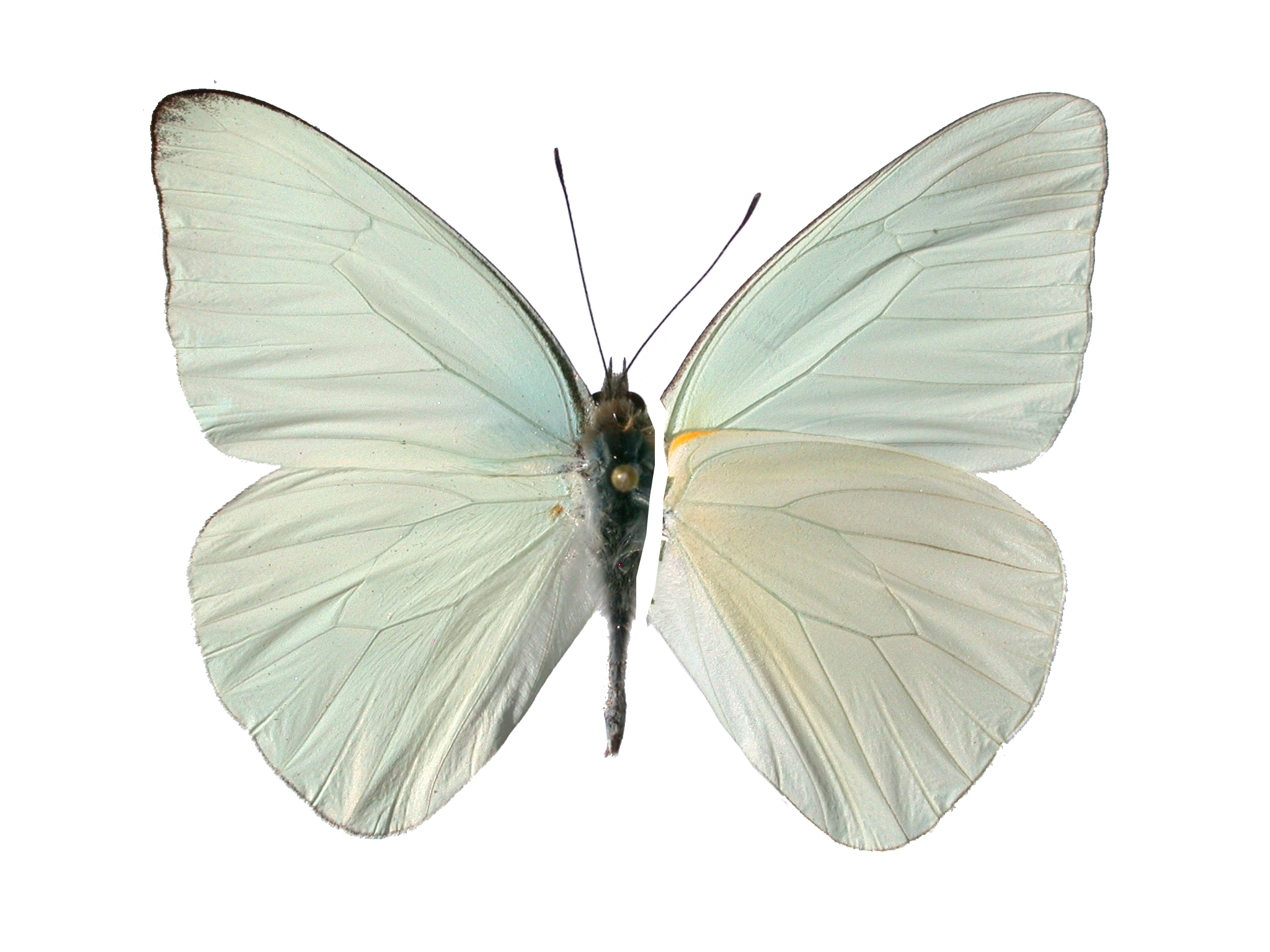
- Glutophrissa drusilla

Scientific classification
- Kingdom: Animalia
- Phylum: Arthropoda
- Clade: Pancrustacea
- Class: Insecta
- Order: Lepidoptera
- Family: Pieridae
- Subtribe: Pierina
- Genus: Glutophrissa; Butler, 1887

= Glutophrissa =

Butterfly genus in family Pieridae

Glutophrissa is a genus of butterflies in the family Pieridae. In several works it is presented as a subgenus Appias (Glutophrissa) and that wider concept has historically included several African species. Instead in other modern works, there are at least two American species generally accepted as Glutophrissa, namely G. drusilla (Cramer, [1777]) with widespread distribution in the Americas, and Glutophrissa punctifera (R.F. d'Almeida, 1939) only known from Puerto Rico.
