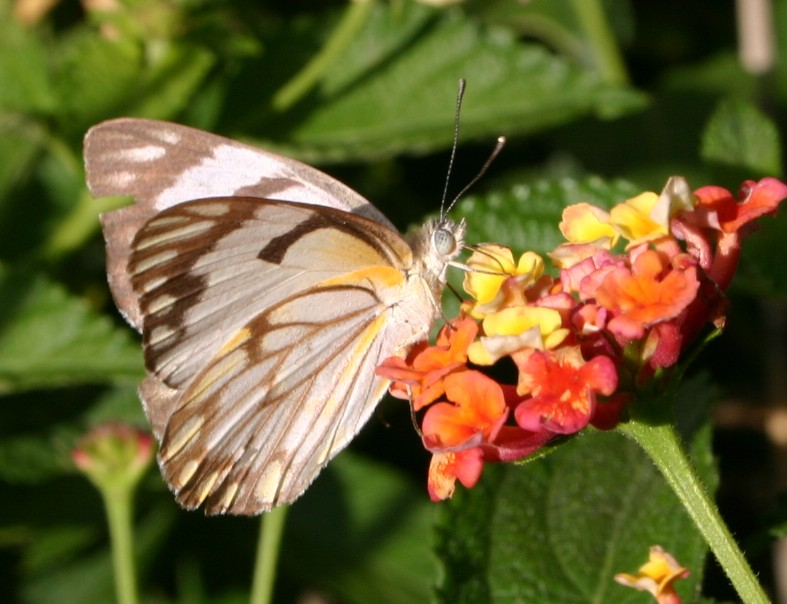
- Belenois aurota pausing during migration to sip nectar from Lantana camara

Scientific classification
- Kingdom: Animalia
- Phylum: Arthropoda
- Class: Insecta
- Order: Lepidoptera
- Family: Pieridae
- Subfamily: Pierinae
- Tribe: Pierini; Swainson, 1820

Genera
- See text

= Pierini (butterflies) =

Tribe of butterflies

Pierini is a tribe of butterflies within the family Pieridae.

== Genera ==
Listed alphabetically:

- Aoa de Nicéville, 1898
- Aporia Hübner, [1819] – blackveins
- Appias Hübner, [1819] – puffins and albatrosses
- Archonias Hübner, 1825
- Ascia Scopoli, 1777
- Baltia Moore, 1878
- Belenois Hübner, [1819] – caper whites
- Catasticta Butler, 1870
- Cepora Billberg, 1820 – gulls
- Charonias Röber, [1908]
- Delias Hübner, [1819] – Jezebels
- Dixeia Talbot, 1932
- Eucheira Westwood, 1834
- Ganyra Billberg, 1820
- Glennia Klots, 1933
- Glutophrissa Butler, 1887
- Hypsochila Ureta, 1955
- Infraphulia Field, 1958
- Itaballia Kaye, 1904
- Ixias Hübner, [1819] – Indian orange tips
- Leodonta Butler, 1870
- Leptophobia Butler, 1870
- Leuciacria Rothschild & Jordan, 1905
- Melete Swainson, [1831]
- Mesapia Gray, 1856
- Mylothris Hübner, [1819] – dotted borders
- Neophasia Behr, 1869
- Pereute Herrich-Schäffer, 1867
- Perrhybris Hübner, [1819]
- Phrissura Butler, 1870
- Phulia Herrich-Schäffer, 1867
- Piercolias Grote, 1903
- Pieriballia Klots, 1933
- Pieris Schrank, 1801 – whites
- Pierphulia Field, 1958
- Pinacopteryx Wallengren, 1857
- Pontia Fabricius, 1807
- Prioneris Wallace, 1867 – sawtooths
- Pseudomylothris Neustetter, 1929
- Reliquia Ackery, 1975
- Saletara Distant, 1885
- Sinopieris Huang, 1995
- Tatochila Butler, 1870
- Theochila Field, 1958
