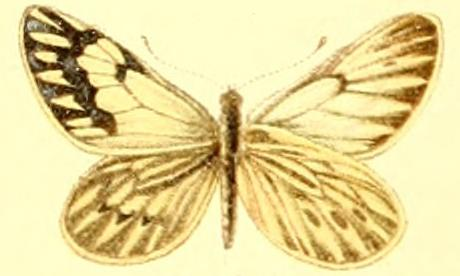
- Female Phulia nymphula nympha

Scientific classification
- Kingdom: Animalia
- Phylum: Arthropoda
- Clade: Pancrustacea
- Class: Insecta
- Order: Lepidoptera
- Family: Pieridae
- Tribe: Pierini
- Genus: Phulia; Herrich-Schäffer, 1867

= Phulia (butterfly) =

Butterfly genus in family Pieridae

Phulia is a Neotropical genus of butterflies in the family Pieridae. The genus was erected by Gottlieb August Wilhelm Herrich-Schäffer in 1867.

== Species ==
- Phulia garleppi Field & Herrera, 1977
- Phulia nannophyes Dyar, 1913
- Phulia nymphula (Blanchard, 1852)
- Phulia paranympha Staudinger, 1894
