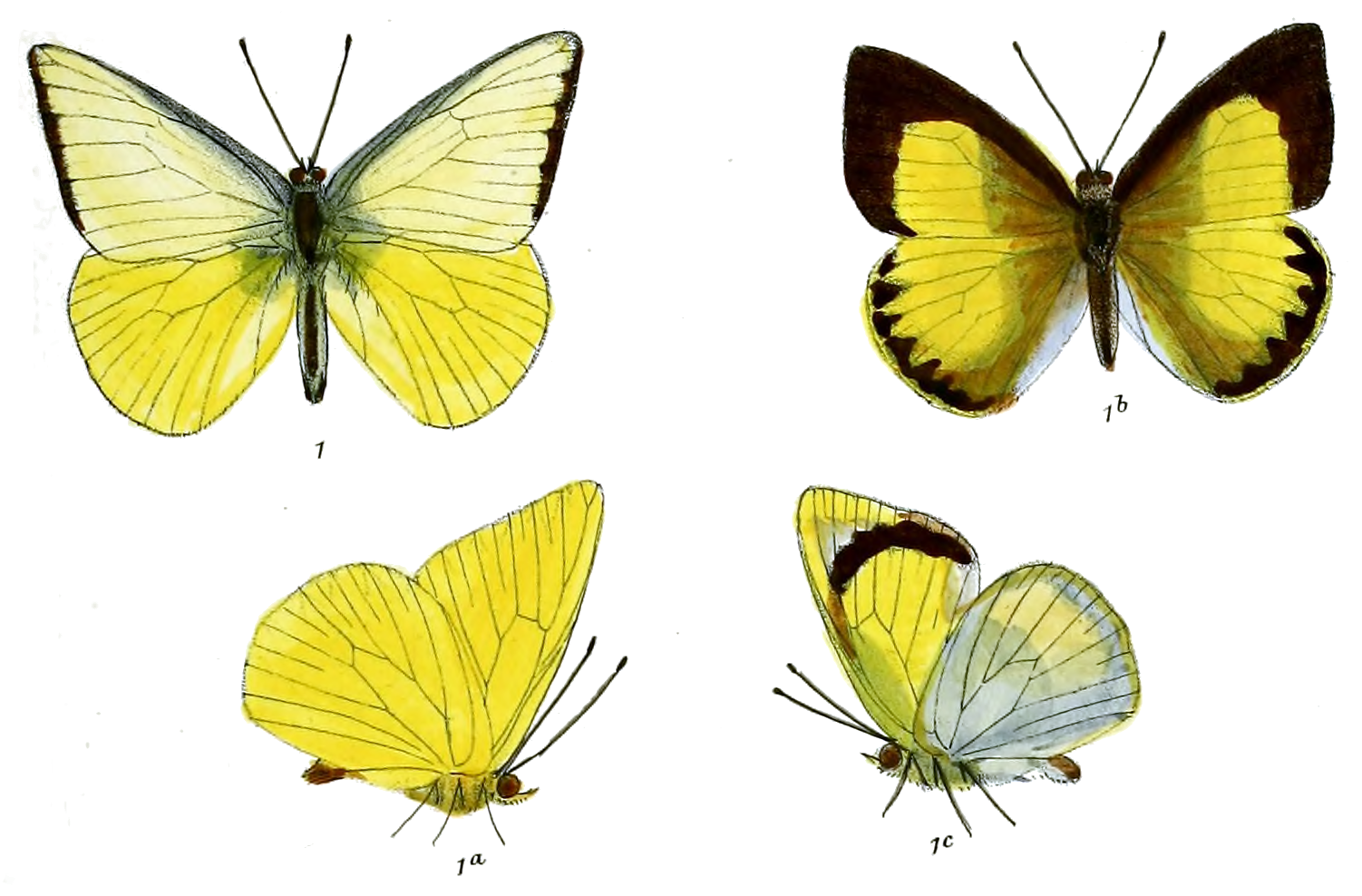
- Saletara liberia chrysea Fruhstorfer, 1903

Scientific classification
- Kingdom: Animalia
- Phylum: Arthropoda
- Clade: Pancrustacea
- Class: Insecta
- Order: Lepidoptera
- Family: Pieridae
- Tribe: Pierini
- Genus: Saletara; Distant, 1885

Species
- See text.

= Saletara =

Butterfly genus in family Pieridae

Saletara is a genus of butterflies in the family Pieridae.

== Species ==
- Saletara cycinna (Hewitson, 1861) New Guinea
- Saletara liberia (Cramer, [1779]) Peninsular Malaya, Singapore, Sumatra, Moluccas, Philippines
- Saletara panda (Godart, 1819) Malay Peninsula, Sumatra, Java, Bali, Borneo, Palawan, Philippines, Sulawesi (may be subspecies of Saletara liberia)
- Saletara gisco (Grose-Smith, 1895) Solomon Islands
