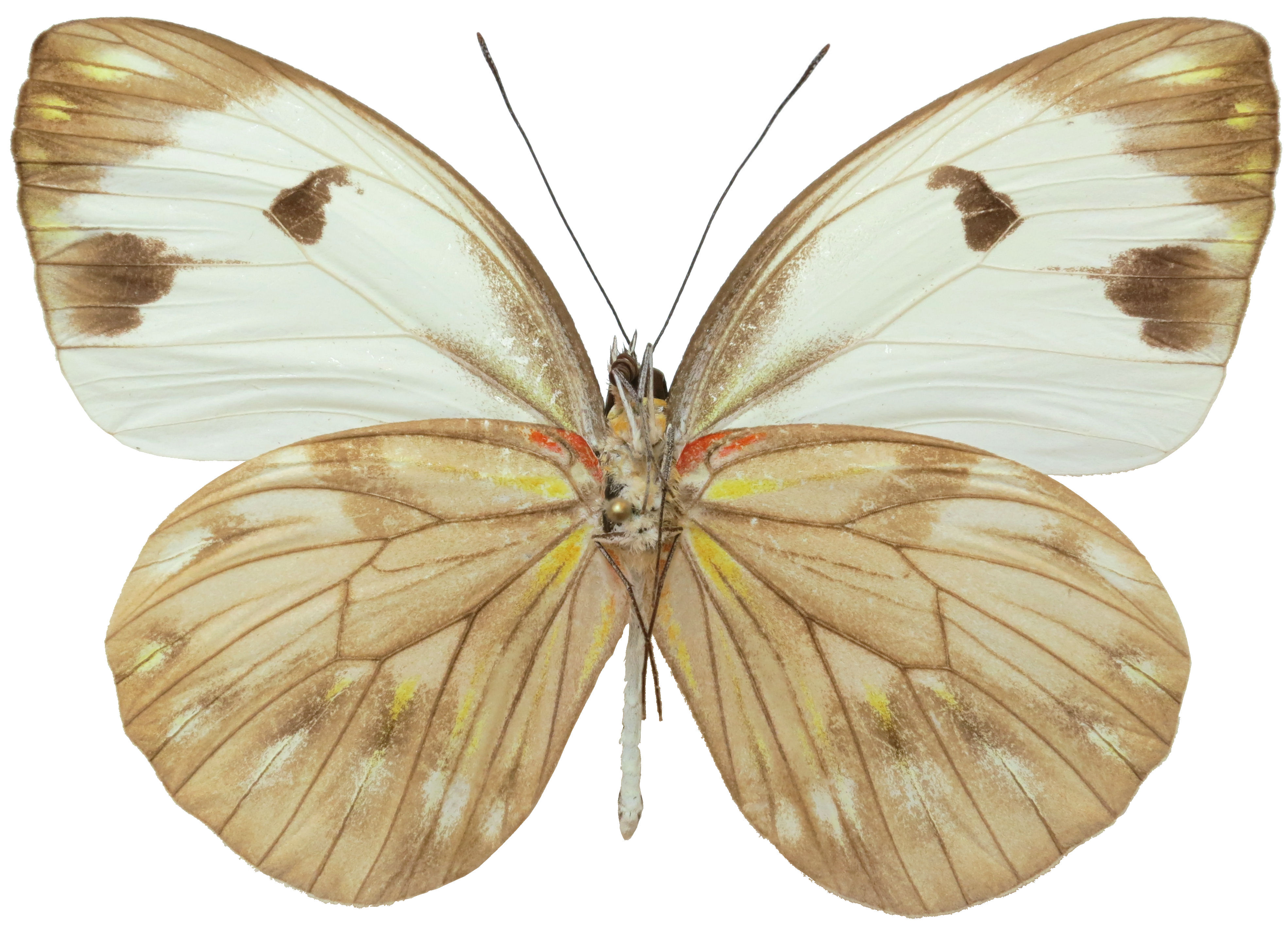
- Pieriballia viardi viardi from Oxchuc, Chiapas, Mexico

Scientific classification
- Kingdom: Animalia
- Phylum: Arthropoda
- Class: Insecta
- Order: Lepidoptera
- Family: Pieridae
- Tribe: Pierini
- Genus: Pieriballia; Klots, 1933
- Species: P. viardi

Binomial name
- Pieriballia viardi (Boisduval, 1836)

Synonyms
- Genus: Neogeia Verity, 1947; Species: Pieris viardi Boisduval, 1836; Mylothris viardi; Pieris habra Doubleday, 1846; Pieris laogore Godman & Salvin, [1889]; Itabalia viardi f. intermedia Vázquez, 1954; Pieris mandela C. Felder & R. Felder, 1861; Itaballia mandela; Haballia mandela; Pieris noctipennis Butler & H. Druce, 1872; Pieris apicalis Butler, 1898; Pieris locusta cocana Fruhstorfer, 1907; Pieris mandela xanthomelas Röber, 1908; Pieris locusta richardi Martin, [1923] (nom. nud.); Pieris tithoreides Butler, 1898; Pieris locusta rubecula Fruhstorfer, 1907; Pieris locusta rubecula f. permagna Fruhstorfer, 1907; Pieris mandela pallida Röber, 1908 (preocc. Scudder, 1861); Pieriballia mandela leucania Röber, 1924; Pieris mandela f. impunctata Breyer, 1939; Pieris mandela maranonensis Joicey & Talbot, 1928

= Pieriballia =

Monotypic butterfly genus in family Pieridae

Pieriballia is a genus of butterflies in the family Pieridae erected by Alexander Barrett Klots in 1933. Its only species, Pieriballia viardi, the painted white or viardi white, was first described by Jean Baptiste Boisduval in 1836. It is found from Mexico to Bolivia and Paraguay. Strays can be found in southern Texas in the United States. The habitat consists of rainforests and transitional cloud forests.

The wingspan is about 57 mm (2.2 in).

The larvae feed on Capparis pseudocacao.

== Subspecies ==
The following subspecies are recognised:

- P. v. viardi (Mexico, Honduras)
- P. v. locusta (C. Felder & R. Felder, 1861) (Colombia)
- P. v. mandela (C. Felder & R. Felder, 1861) (Venezuela)
- P. v. noctipennis (Butler & H. Druce, 1872) (Costa Rica, Panama)
- P. v. apicalis (Butler, 1898) (Ecuador)
- P. v. tithoreides (Butler, 1898) (Ecuador)
- P. v. rubecula (Fruhstorfer, 1907) (Peru, Bolivia)
- P. v. molione (Fruhstorfer, 1908) (Paraguay, Argentina)
- P. v. decorata (Joicey & Talbot, 1928) (Peru)
- P. v. interposita (Joicey & Talbot, 1928) (Peru)
