= Antibiosis =

Biological interaction between organisms

Antibiosis, also referred to as antagonism, a process of biological interaction between two or more organisms that is detrimental to at least one of them; it can also be an antagonistic association between an organism and the metabolic substances produced by another. Antibiosis can occur through a variety of mechanisms, with "injury, death, reduced longevity, or reduced reproduction of the pest" being common. The process of antibiosis is either reversible or irreversible, and is caused by the production of volatile organic compounds by plant-growth-promoting rhizobacterium (PGPR). Antibiosis is one of two forms of amensalism, the other form being competition. Primary examples of antibiosis include "antibacterial activity against bacteria, fungus, nematodes, insects, and occasionally against plants and algae".

== Examples of antibiosis ==
=== Antibiosis in biotech and medical treatment ===
The study of antibiosis and its role in antibiotics has led to the expansion of knowledge in the field of microbiology. Molecular processes such cell wall synthesis and recycling, for example, have become better understood through the study of how antibiotics affect beta-lactam development through the antibiosis relationship and interaction of the particular drugs with the bacteria subjected to the compound. For example, the Penicillium fungi responds to bacterial infections by producing penicillin, which is toxic to bacteria and is commonly used in medical settings as an effective treatment for bacterial infections. Penicillin belongs to the beta-lactam antibiotic class.

=== Host plant resistance through antibiosis ===
Antibiosis is typically studied in host plant populations and extends to the insects which feed upon them. Antibiosis can be seen in certain vegetables, as antibiosis mechanisms have been found in Brassica species to protect against cabbage whitefly.

"Antibiosis resistance affects the biology of the insect so pest abundance and subsequent damage is reduced compared to that which would have occurred if the insect was on a susceptible crop variety. Antibiosis resistance often results in increased mortality or reduced longevity and reproduction of the insect."

During a study of antibiosis, it was determined that the key to achieving effective antibiosis relies on the organism being sessile. "When you give antibiotic-producing bacteria a structured medium, they affix to substrate, grow clonally, and produce a 'no man's land,' absent competitors, where the antibiotics diffuse outward." Antibiosis is most effective when resources are neither plentiful nor sparse. Antibiosis should be considered as the median on the scale of resource, due to its ideal performance.

=== Other examples ===
The black walnut, Juglans nigra, produces a secretion called juglone, which is toxic to a variety of flowers, herbaceous plants, and field crops. This toxic secretion creates an area surrounding the black walnut tree that is uninhabitable to most species.

In many environments, antibiosis can promote mutualisms and/or competition between species in an ecosystem. Attine ants provide an example of a more complex antibiosis mechanism. Attine ants maintain cultivations of Leucocoprinus fungi as their primary source of consumption, however, a parasitic fungal genus, Escovopsis, feeds on Leucocoprinus and disrupts the food system of the ants. In response to this, attine ants encourage growth of the Pseudonocardia actinomycete, as it produces an antimicrobial compound that suppresses the parasitic Escovopsis. The attine ants, Leucocoprinus fungi and Pseudonocardia actinomycete all benefit in this interaction, however it is detrimental to the Escovopsis fungi.

== See also ==
- Antibiotic
- Biological pest control
- Biotechnology
- Symbiosis
- Plant defense against herbivory
- Secondary metabolite
- Competition (biology)
