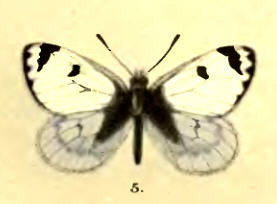
- Illustration from Ferdinand Stoliczka's Yarkand collection

Scientific classification
- Kingdom: Animalia
- Phylum: Arthropoda
- Class: Insecta
- Order: Lepidoptera
- Family: Pieridae
- Genus: Pontia
- Species: P. shawii

Binomial name
- Pontia shawii (Bates, 1873)

Synonyms
- Mesapia shawii Bates, 1873

= Pontia shawii =

Shaw's dwarf

Species of butterfly

Pontia shawii, the Shaw's dwarf, is a small butterfly of the family Pieridae, that is, the yellows and whites. It is found at high altitudes in Central Asia.

== Description ==
Male on upperside is pale white; base of wings irrorated with black scales. Forewing: costal margin very narrowly yellowish, costal and subcostal veins irrorated with black scales, a discocellular elongate oblique black spot; a narrowly sub-triangular short oblique pre-apical black bar, its apex downwards, and a series of inwardly triangular black spots on the termen, these narrow posteriorly and reach from the apex of wing to vein 1. Hindwing: uniform, the irroration (sprinkling) of black scales more extended than on the forewing.

Underside: forewing white; costa and apex irrorated with black scales, the costa and termen margined with a line of pinkish yellow; the black discocellular spot, the black pre-apical bar and terminal series of black spots much as on the upperside, but the last is ill-defined, somewhat diffuse at apex and does not descend below vein 3. Hindwing: white with a dull pinkish tinge all over; the whole surface irrorated with black scales that form a broad elongate patch on posterior half of the wing and an obscure curved macular discal band beyond the cell; discocellulars defined with black.

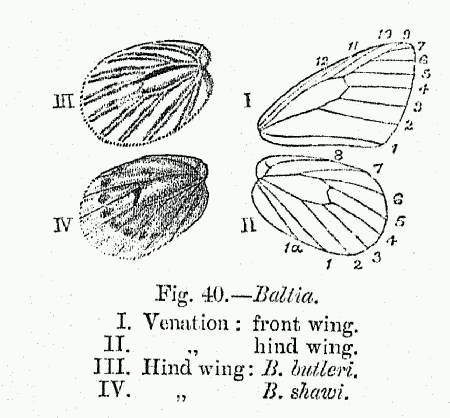
Venation of Pontia species and comparison of hindwings of P. butleri and P. shawii

The female differs from the male as follows: Upperside: somewhat thickly irrorated all over with black scales. Forewing with the discocellular black spot and terminal series of inwardly-pointed triangular black spots as in the male, but the latter more complete, extends from apex to tornus, the spots are larger and there is no pre-apical bar, out a complete, outwardly dentate, curved discal black band that crosses the wing from costa to dorsum. Hindwing: the irroration of black scales very dense in a broad patch posteriorly, and so arranged as to form a curved macular discal band. Underside similar to that of the male, but on the forewing there is a complete terminal series of inwardly triangular black spots and a complete, outwardly dentate, curved discal black band; while on the hindwing the irroration of black scales is denser. In both sexes the antennae are white annulated (ringed) with black, the club black; head whitish; thorax and abdomen fuscous black; beneath: head and thorax fuscous black, abdomen prominently white.

Wingspan 34–50 mm.

Recorded from the Karakoram mountains at an elevation of 18,000 feet (5,500 m); found also in the Pamirs and Tibet.

== See also ==
- List of butterflies of India (Pieridae)
