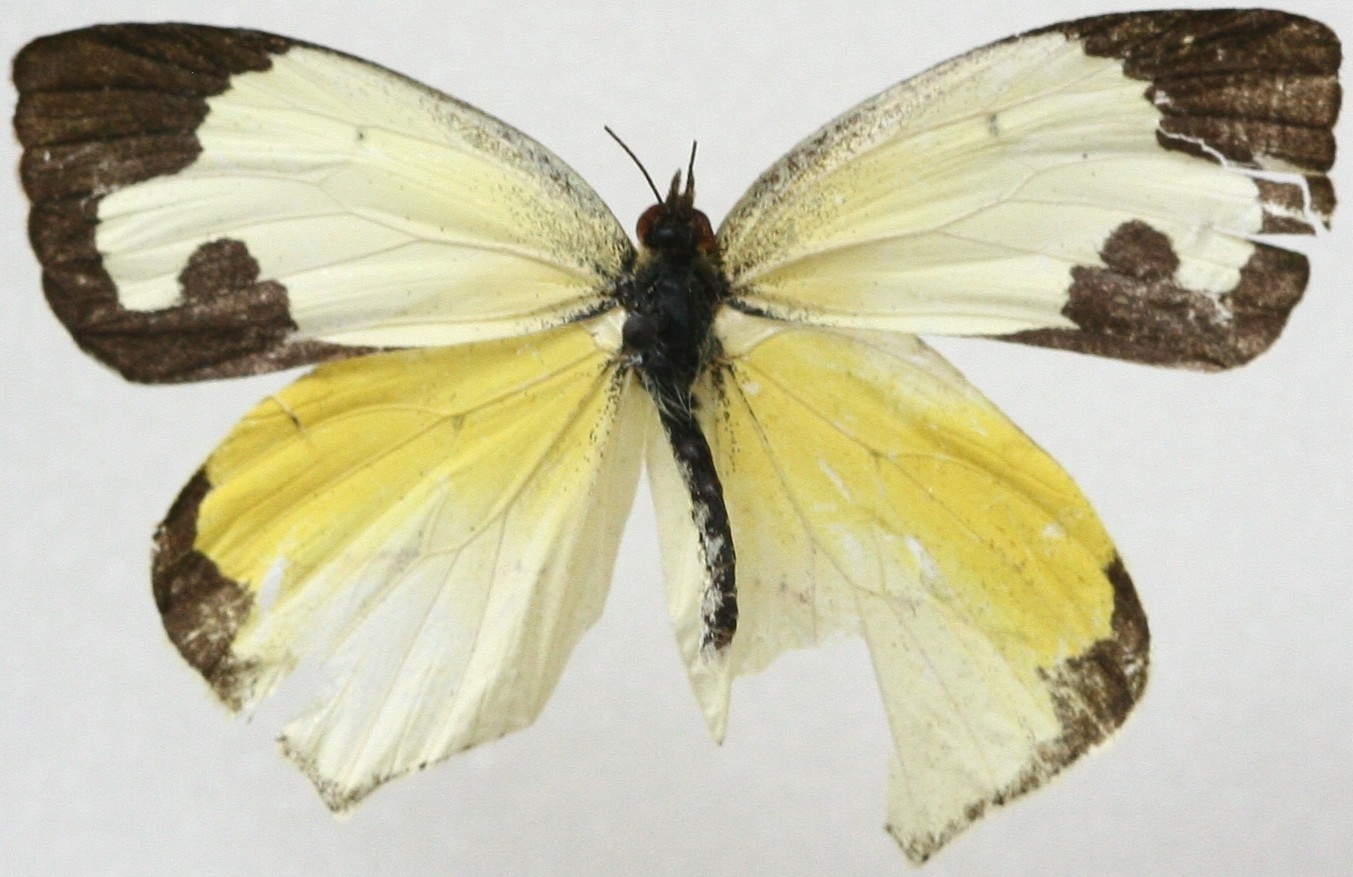
- Male
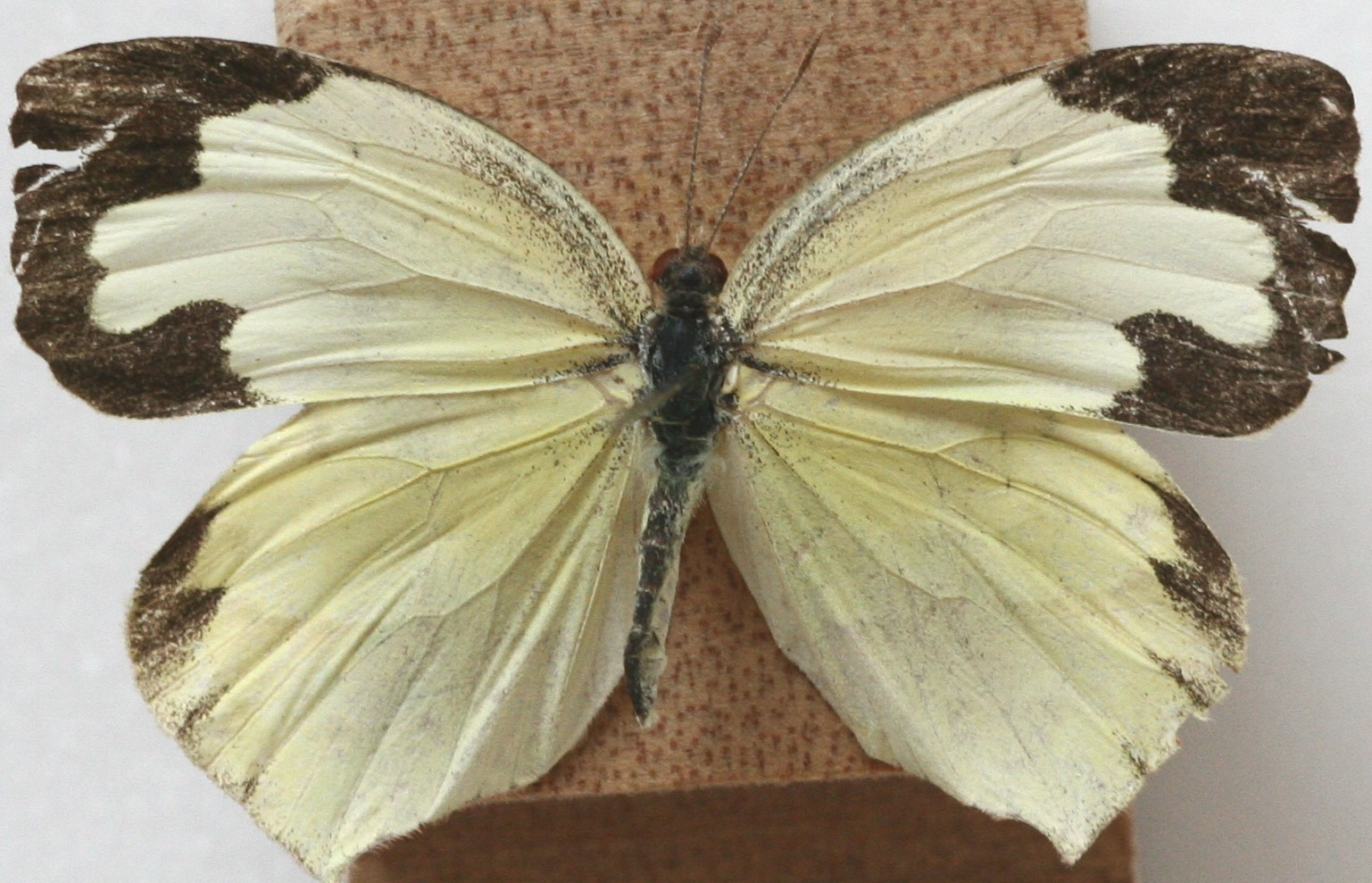
- Female

Conservation status
- Secure (NatureServe)

Scientific classification
- Kingdom: Animalia
- Phylum: Arthropoda
- Clade: Pancrustacea
- Class: Insecta
- Order: Lepidoptera
- Family: Pieridae
- Genus: Eurema
- Species: E. mexicana

Binomial name
- Eurema mexicana (Boisduval, 1836)

Synonyms
- Terias mexicana (Boisduval, 1836); Abaeis mexicana; Sphaenogona mexicana; Terias damaris (C. Felder & R. Felder, 1865); Terias depuiseti (Boisduval, 1870); Eurema biedermanni (Ehrmann, 1925); Eurema mexicana f. rosa (Whittaker & Stallings, 1944); Terias bogotana C. & R. Felder, 1861

= Eurema mexicana =

Species of butterfly

Eurema mexicana, the Mexican yellow, sometimes called the wolf-face sulphur, is a North and South American butterfly in the family Pieridae. It occurs mainly in Mexico but occasionally is found in central and southwestern United States and rarely in Canada.

== Description ==
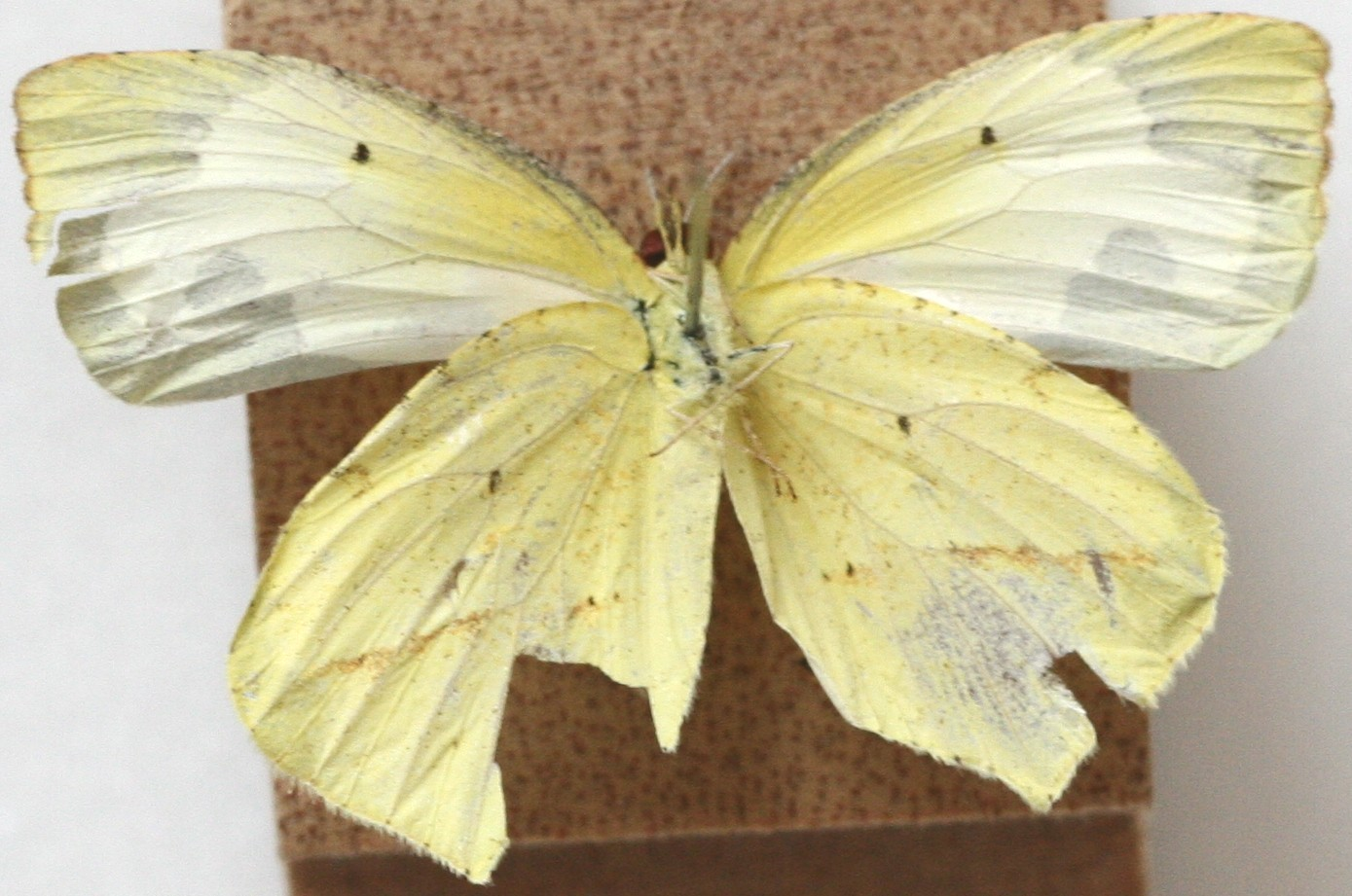
Underside of summer form

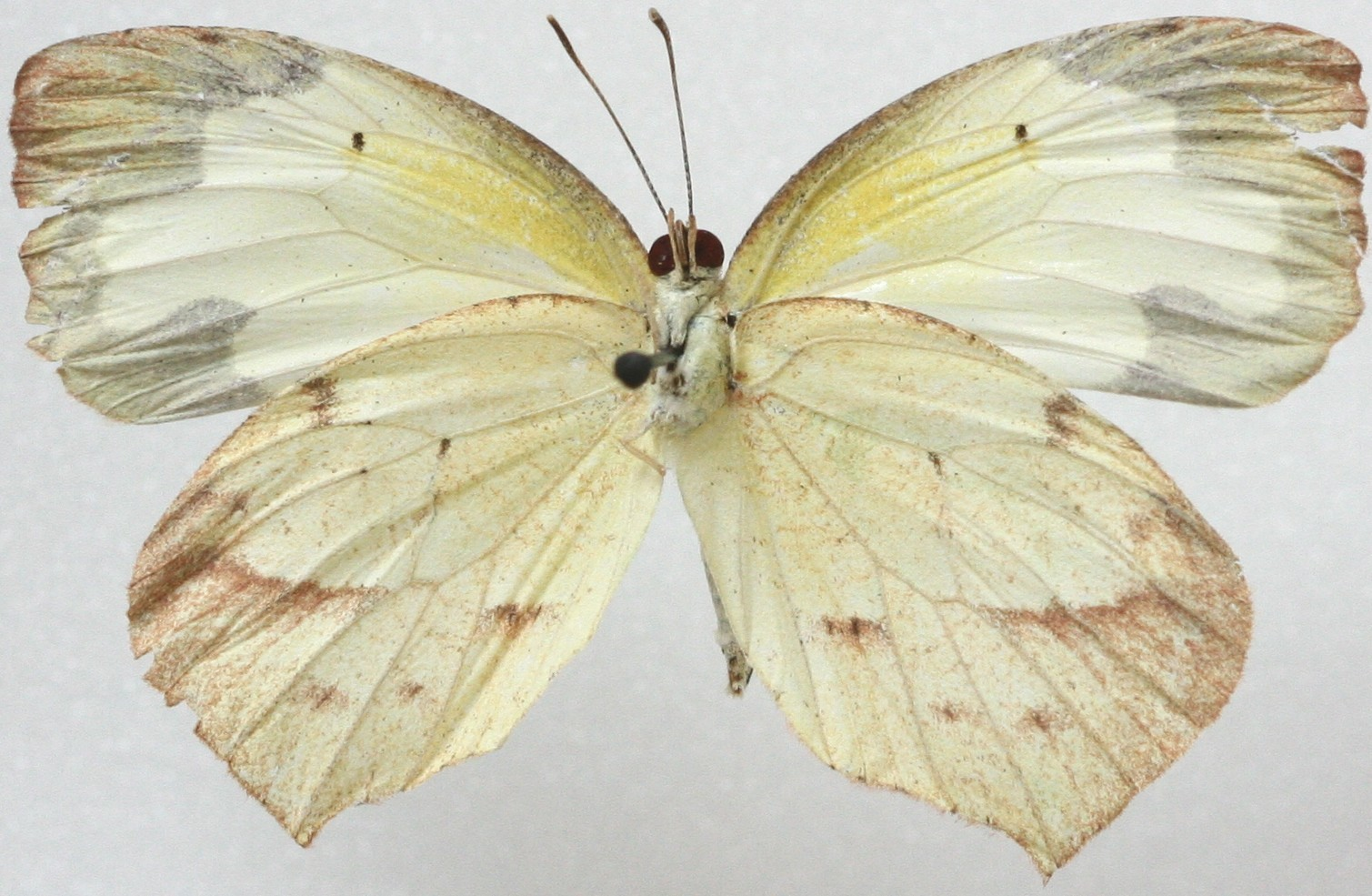
Underside of winter form

The upperside of the wings is pale yellow with a black forewing submarginal border outlining a "dog" or "wolf-face" pattern. The hindwing has a small outer margin black border. The male has a bright yellow patch on the leading edge of the hindwing. The underside of the wings is pale yellow in summer individuals and pale yellow with reddish markings or all reddish pink in winter individuals. The hindwing is sharply pointed. The wingspan measures 1 1/4 to 2 1/4 inches (32–57 mm).

== Similar species ==
Similar species in the Mexican yellow's range include Boisduval's yellow (Eurema boisduvaliana) and the Salome yellow (Eurema salome).

Boisduval's yellow is smaller and brighter yellow, the male has a weaker "dog face" pattern, the female has reduced black on the upper side, and the hindwing is less sharply pointed.

The Salome yellow is brighter yellow, has more limited black on the upperside, and the underside of the hindwing has a round reddish spot near the trailing edge.

== Habitat ==
The Mexican yellow lives in a variety of open habitats such as woodland edges, open woodlands, and desert grasslands.

== Flight ==
This butterfly may be seen almost all year in Arizona and Texas, and April to November in New Mexico. It strays northward in late summer, rarely reaching Canada.

== Life cycle ==
Males will patrol all day looking for females. The larva is green with a middorsal creamy or yellow stripe and a lateral yellow stripe. The Mexican yellow has 3-4 broods per year.

== Host plants ==
Here is a list of host plants used by the Mexican yellow:

- New Mexican locust, Robinia neomexicana
- Fern acacia, Acacia angustissima
- Prairie acacia, Acacia angustissima var. hirta
- Cassia species
- Diphysa robinoides.
