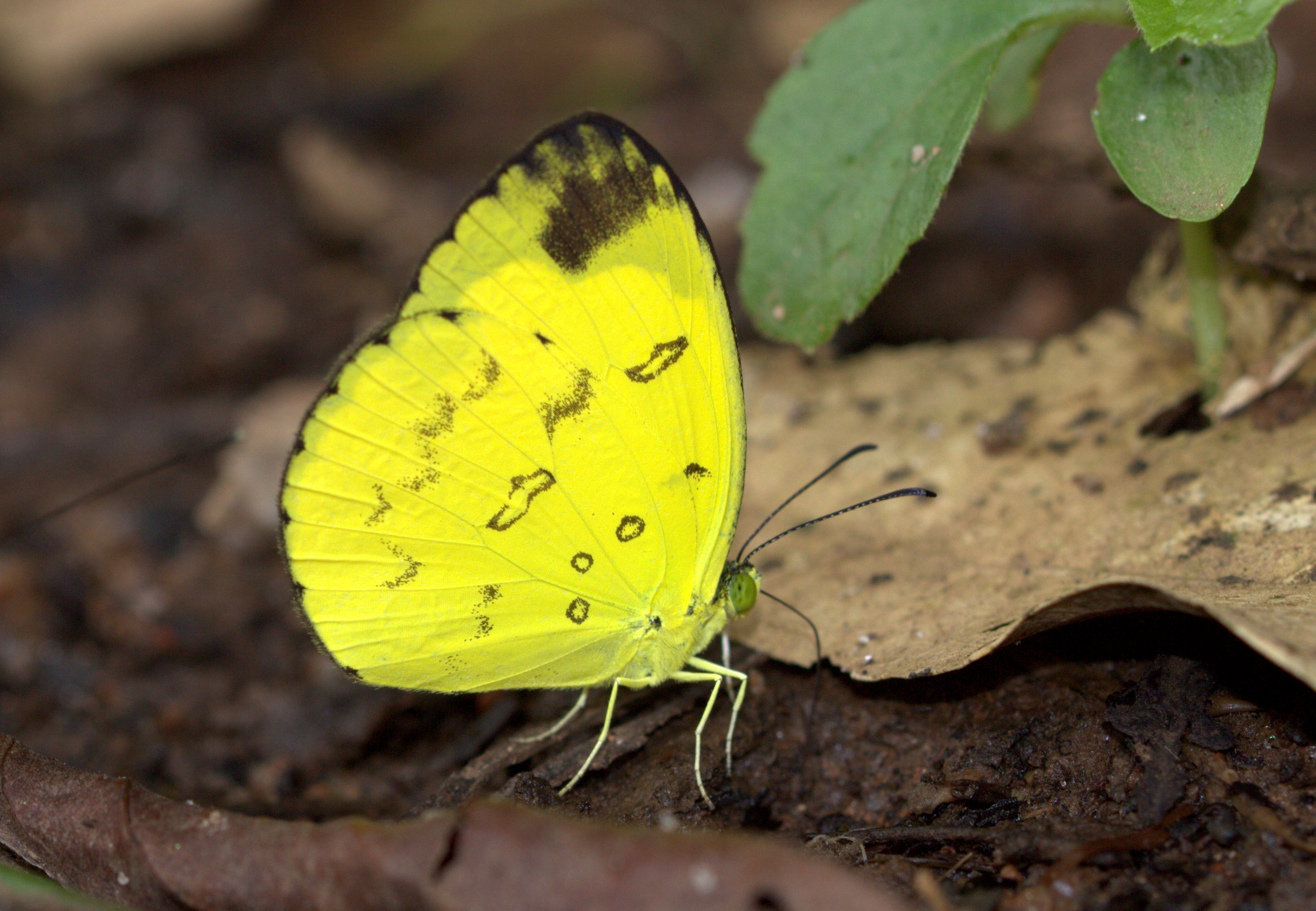

Scientific classification
- Kingdom: Animalia
- Phylum: Arthropoda
- Class: Insecta
- Order: Lepidoptera
- Family: Pieridae
- Genus: Eurema
- Species: E. nilgiriensis

Binomial name
- Eurema nilgiriensis Yata, 1990

= Eurema nilgiriensis =

Nilgiri grass yellow

Species of butterfly

Eurema nilgiriensis, the Nilgiri grass yellow, is a small butterfly of the family Pieridae, that is, the yellows and whites, which is found in south India.

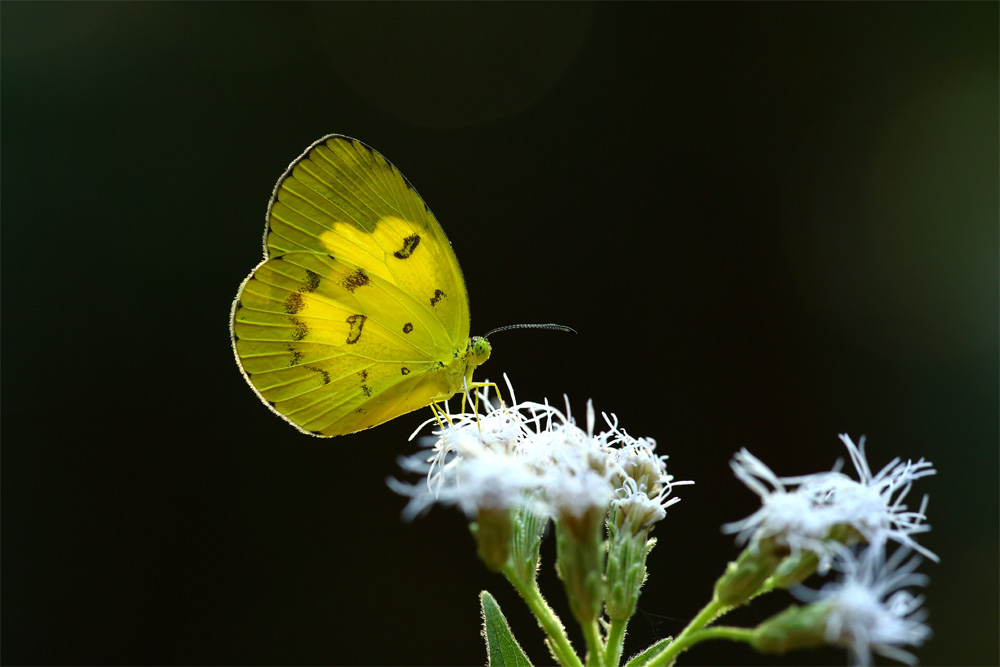
Eurema nilgiriensis from Kozhikode, Kerala

It is closely related to Eurema andersoni, Eurema ormistoni, Eurema celebensis and Eurema beatrix. This species is known only from south India.

== See also ==
- List of butterflies of India
- List of butterflies of India (Pieridae)
