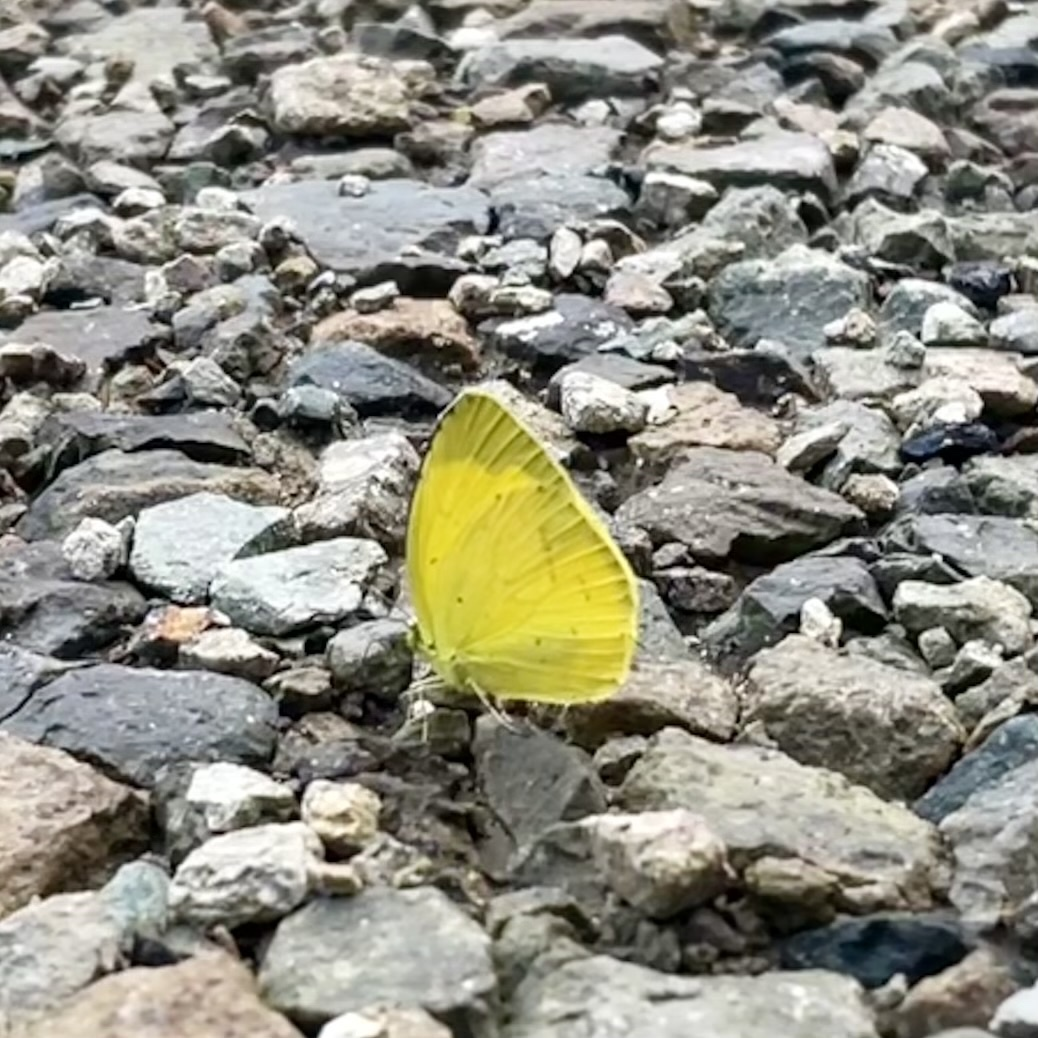

Scientific classification
- Kingdom: Animalia
- Phylum: Arthropoda
- Class: Insecta
- Order: Lepidoptera
- Family: Pieridae
- Genus: Eurema
- Species: E. mandarina

Binomial name
- Eurema mandarina De L'Orza 1869

= Eurema mandarina =

Species of butterfly

Eurema mandarina, also known by its common name Japanese common grass yellow, is a species from the genus Eurema. It is a coliadine butterfly.
