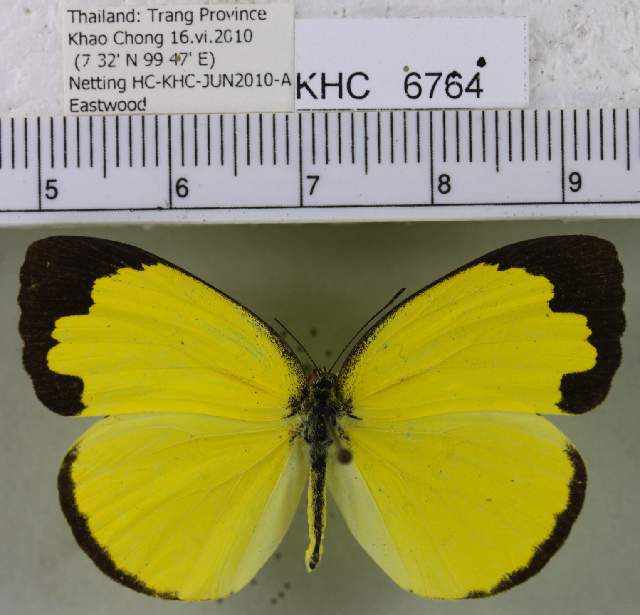
- Dorsal view (specimen)
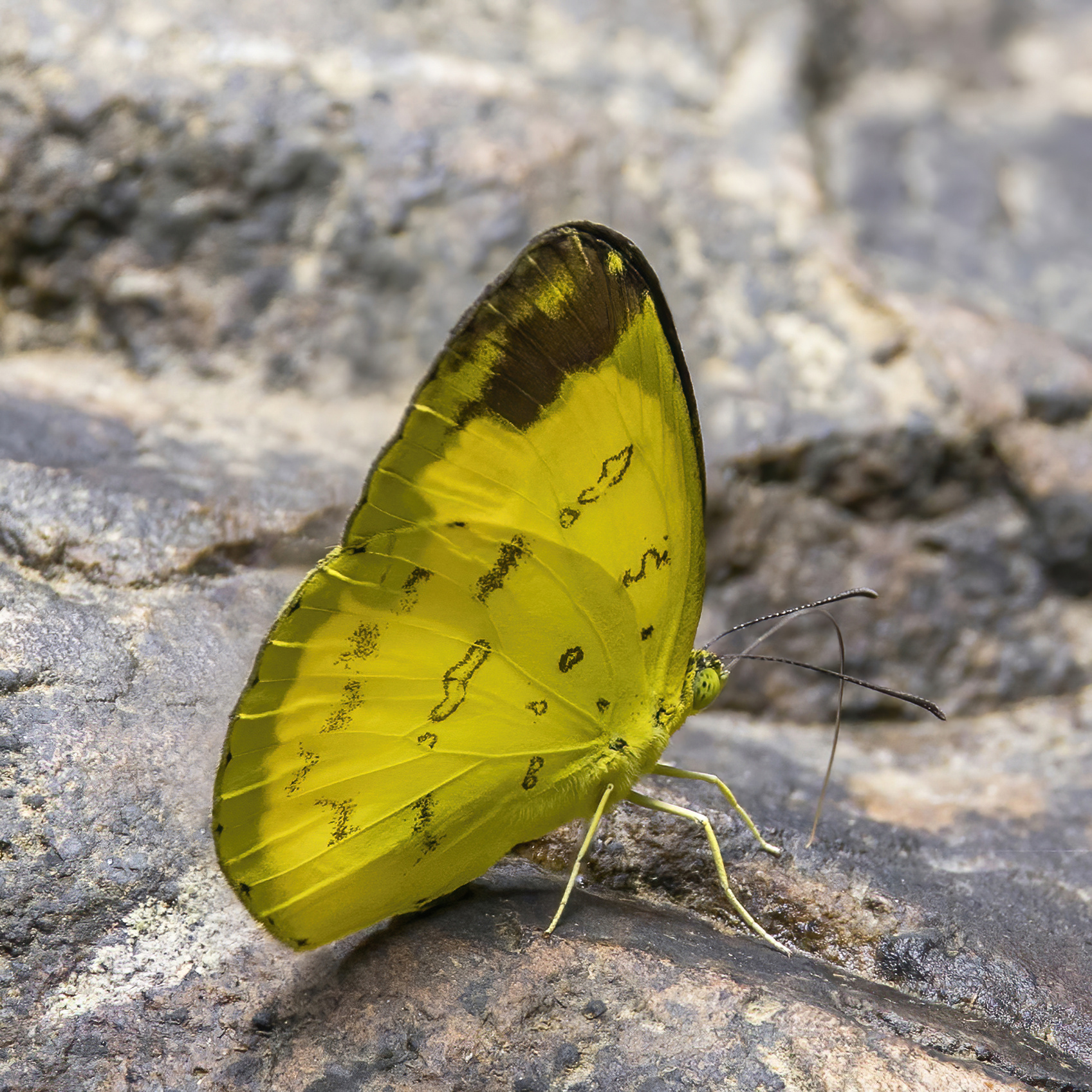
- E. s. tecmessa, Thailand

Scientific classification
- Kingdom: Animalia
- Phylum: Arthropoda
- Clade: Pancrustacea
- Class: Insecta
- Order: Lepidoptera
- Family: Pieridae
- Genus: Eurema
- Species: E. simulatrix

Binomial name
- Eurema simulatrix (Semper, 1891)

Synonyms
- Terias simulatrix Semper, 1891; Terias tecmessa de Nicéville & Martin, [1896]; Terias hecabe grandis f. sarinoides Fruhstorfer, 1910; Eurema simulatrix tecmessa f. stockleyi Corbet & Pendlebury, 1932

= Eurema simulatrix =

Changeable grass yellow

Species of butterfly

Eurema simulatrix, the changeable grass yellow, is a butterfly in the family Pieridae. It is found from Burma to Sundaland, Cambodia and the Philippines. The habitat consists of secondary or disturbed habitats including forest clearings, roadsides and riverbanks, parks and gardens.

The length of the forewings is 21–26 mm (0.83–1.02 in) for males and 19–25 mm (0.75–0.98 in) for females. Adults have two cell spots on the underside of the forewings and a large, almost cleft, reddish-brown apical spot on the forewing.

== Subspecies ==
The following subspecies are recognised:

- E. s. simulatrix (Philippines: Mindanao)
- E. s. princessae Morishita, 1973 (Palawan)
- E. s. tecmessa (de Nicéville & Martin, [1896]) (southern Burma, Peninsular Malaya, southern Thailand, Singapore, Sumatra, Java, Borneo) – de Nicéville's grass yellow
- E. s. sarinoides (Fruhstorfer, 1910) (Sikkim to Burma, northern Thailand, Laos) – scarce changeable grass yellow
- E. s. littorea Morishita, 1968 (Langkawi)
- E. s. inouei Shirôzu & Yata, 1973 (Thailand, Cambodia, Indo-China)
- E. s. tiomanica Okubo, 1983 (Tioman)

Eurema irena is sometimes treated as a subspecies of Eurema simulatrix.
