= Grass yellow =

Grass yellow or grass yellows may refer to:

- Eurema, a genus of butterflies commonly called the grass yellows
- Eurema hecabe, a species in this genus usually called the common grass yellow or large grass yellow
