= Eurema sarilata =

Scientific classification
- Domain: Eukaryota
- Kingdom: Animalia
- Phylum: Arthropoda
- Class: Insecta
- Order: Lepidoptera
- Family: Pieridae
- Genus: Eurema
- Species: E. sarilata

Binomial name
- Eurema sarilata (Semper, 1891)

Synonyms
- Panaom sarilata Semper, 1891; Terias mindorana Butler, 1898; Eurema sarilata bazilana Shirôzu & Yata, 1981; Eurema sarilata luzonensis Shirôzu & Yata, 1981

Species of butterfly

Eurema sarilata is a coliadine butterfly endemic to the Philippines.

== Subspecies ==
- E. s. sarilata (North Philippines and Central Philippines)
- E. s. mindorana (Butler, 1898) (Philippines: Mindoro)
- E. s. perplexa Shirôzu & Yata, 1982 (Philippines: Basilan)
- E. s. aquilo Shirôzu & Yata, 1982 (Philippines: Luzon)
- E. s. risa Morishita, 1982 (Philippines: Negros)
- E. s. sibuyanensis Yata & Treadaway, 1982 (Sibuyan Island)
