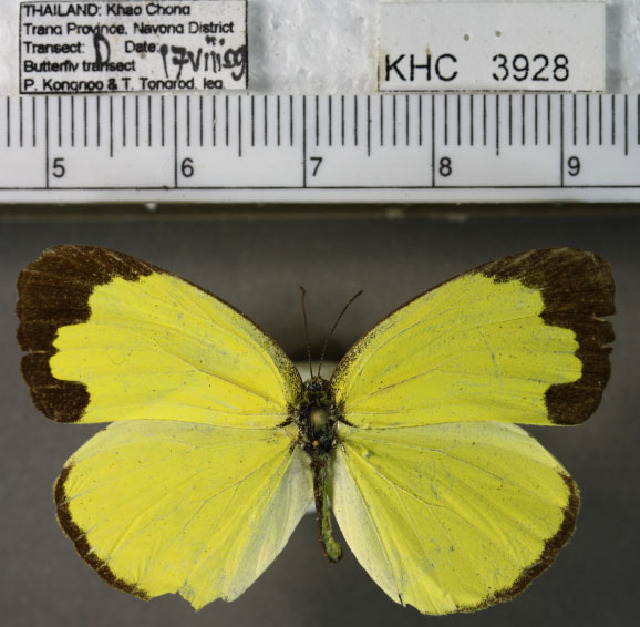
- Dorsal view
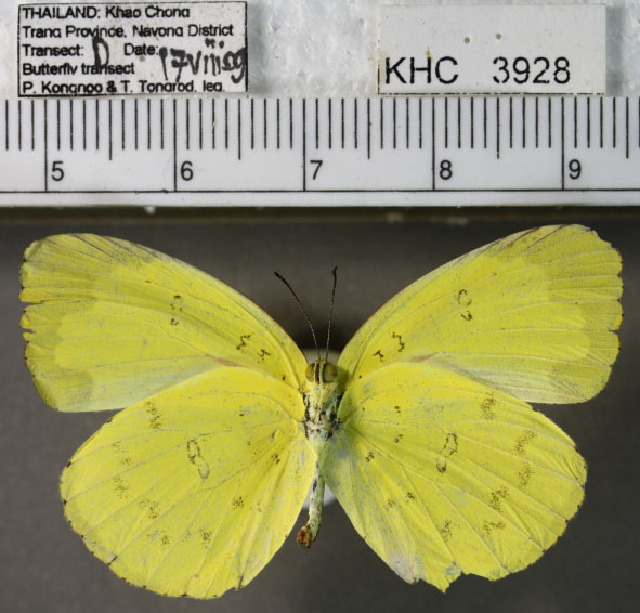
- Ventral view

Scientific classification
- Kingdom: Animalia
- Phylum: Arthropoda
- Clade: Pancrustacea
- Class: Insecta
- Order: Lepidoptera
- Family: Pieridae
- Genus: Eurema
- Species: E. lacteola

Binomial name
- Eurema lacteola Distant, 1886

= Eurema lacteola =

Scarce grass yellow

Species of butterfly

Eurema lacteola, the scarce grass yellow, is a small butterfly of the family Pieridae, that is, the yellows and whites, which is found in India, Thailand Peninsular Malaya, Java, Sumatra and Borneo.

== See also ==
- List of butterflies of India
- List of butterflies of India (Pieridae)
