= Eurema upembana =

Scientific classification
- Kingdom: Animalia
- Phylum: Arthropoda
- Class: Insecta
- Order: Lepidoptera
- Family: Pieridae
- Genus: Eurema
- Species: E. upembana

Binomial name
- Eurema upembana (Berger, 1981)

Synonyms
- Terias upembana Berger, 1981; Eurema (Terias) upembana

Species of butterfly

Eurema upembana is a butterfly in the family Pieridae. It is found in the Democratic Republic of the Congo (upper Lomami) and Tanzania. The habitat consists of montane grasslands and forests.
