= Eurema desjardinsii =

Angled grass yellow

Scientific classification
- Kingdom: Animalia
- Phylum: Arthropoda
- Clade: Pancrustacea
- Class: Insecta
- Order: Lepidoptera
- Family: Pieridae
- Genus: Eurema
- Species: E. desjardinsii

Binomial name
- Eurema desjardinsii (Boisduval, 1833)

Synonyms
- Eurema desjardinsi (Boisduval, 1833); Xanthidia desjardinsi Boisduval, 1833; Terias aliena Butler, 1880; Terias desjardinsi ab. drueti Dufrane, 1947; Terias marshalli Butler, 1898; Terias desjardinsi f. philonoe Stoneham, 1957; Terias desjardinsi f. dulcinea Stoneham, 1957; Terias desjardinsi marshalli f. pseudoregularis Berger, 1981

Species of butterfly

Eurema desjardinsii, the angled grass yellow, is a butterfly of the family Pieridae, found in Africa.

The wingspan is 35–38 mm for males and 37–40 mm for females. Adults are on wing year-round, depending on rainfall.

The larvae feed on Chamaecrista mimosoides and probably Hypericum aethiopicum.

== Subspecies ==
- Eurema desjardinsii desjardinsi (Madagascar, Comoro Islands)
- Eurema desjardinsii marshalli (Butler, 1898) (Kenya, South Africa)
- Eurema desjardinsii regularis

Torben Larsen developed a species numbering system for his 2005 publication Butterflies of West Africa. The subspecies regularis is #42. The 'Larsen' numbers have since been used with permission in A Sharp Eye on Butterflies of Ghana.
