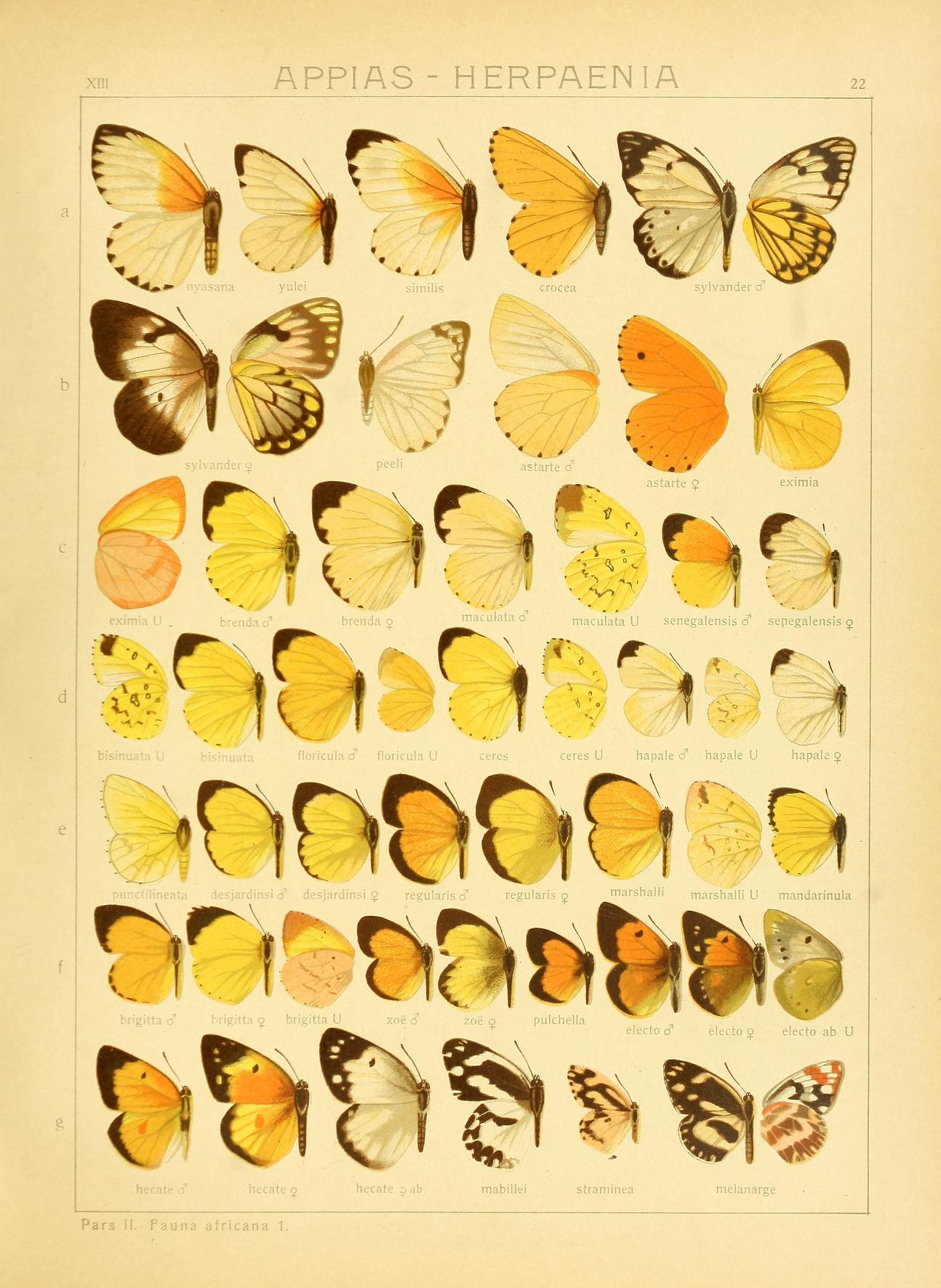
- 22e

Scientific classification
- Kingdom: Animalia
- Phylum: Arthropoda
- Clade: Pancrustacea
- Class: Insecta
- Order: Lepidoptera
- Family: Pieridae
- Genus: Eurema
- Species: E. regularis

Binomial name
- Eurema regularis (Butler, 1876)

Synonyms
- Terias regularis Butler, 1876; Eurema (Eurema) regularis; Terias oberthuri Mabille, 1877; Terias regularis f. plagiata Berger, 1981

= Eurema regularis =

Species of butterfly

Eurema regularis, the even-bordered grass yellow or regular grass yellow, is a butterfly in the family Pieridae. It is found in Senegal, Guinea, Sierra Leone, Liberia, Ivory Coast, Ghana, Togo, Nigeria, the Republic of the Congo, Angola, the Democratic Republic of the Congo, Ethiopia, Rwanda, Burundi, Kenya to Zambia, eastern Zimbabwe and western Mozambique. The habitat consists of woodland and forest margins.

Adults are on wing year round.
