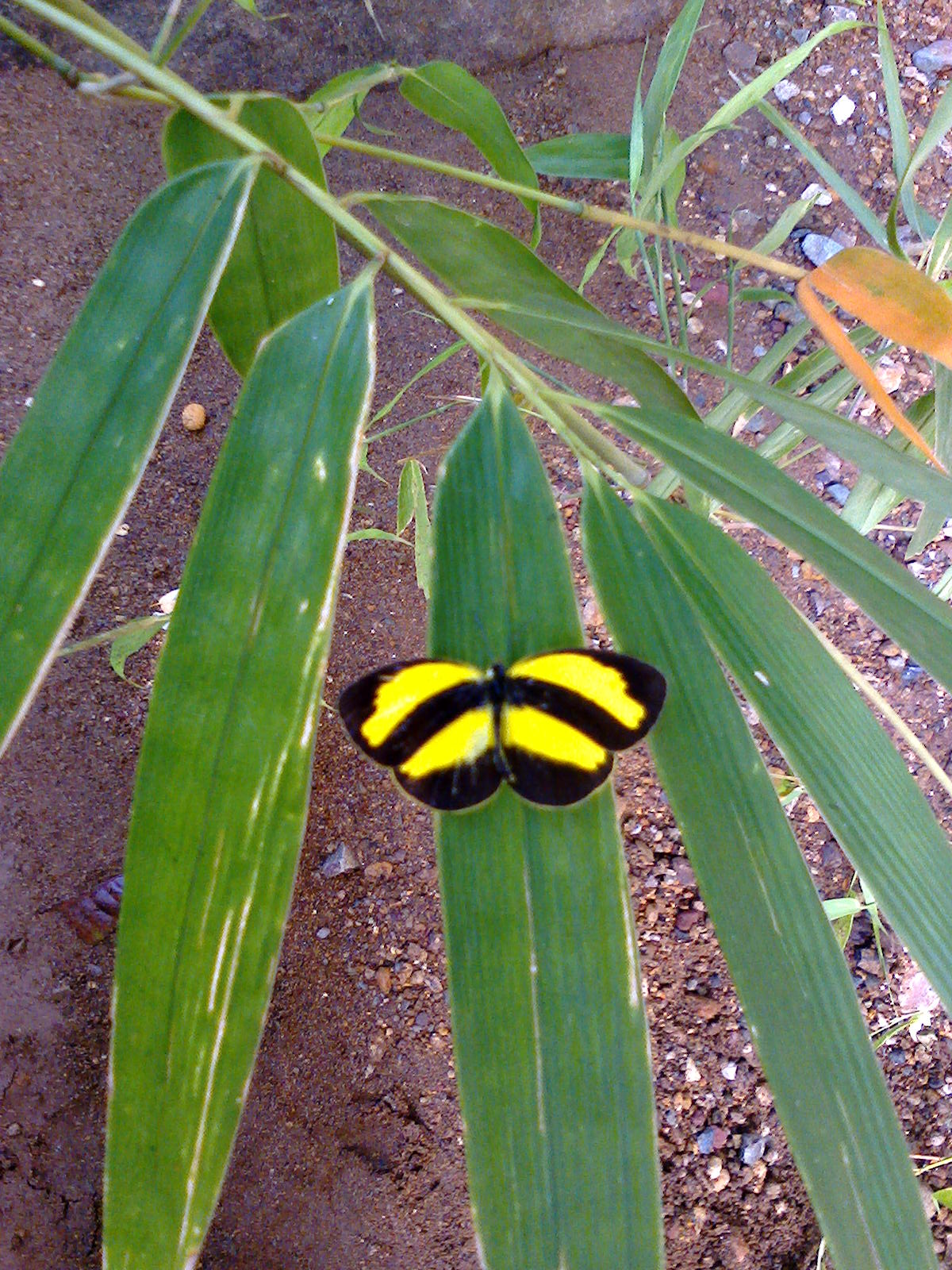
- E. a. zita, from Sungai Pontolo, North Gorontalo, Sulawesi

Conservation status
- Least Concern (IUCN 3.1)

Scientific classification
- Kingdom: Animalia
- Phylum: Arthropoda
- Class: Insecta
- Order: Lepidoptera
- Family: Pieridae
- Genus: Eurema
- Species: E. alitha

Binomial name
- Eurema alitha (C. & R. Felder, 1862)

Synonyms
- Terias invida Butler, 1883; Eurema zita

= Eurema alitha =

Scalloped grass yellow

Species of butterfly

Eurema alitha, the scalloped grass yellow, is a butterfly species in the genus Eurema. It was first described as Terias alitha by father and son entomologists Cajetan and Rudolf Felder in 1862. It is found in Southeast Asia.

== Subspecies ==
- E. a. alitha (Mindanao)
- E. a. basilana (Basilan)
- E. a. djampeana (Tanah Jampea)
- E. a. esakii (Taiwan)
- E. a. garama (Sulu Islands)
- E. a. gradiens (northern Borneo)
- E. a. jalendra (Palawan)
- E. a. novaguineensis (Papua, Indonesia, Papua New Guinea)
- E. a. samarana (Samar)
- E. a. sanama (Sulu Islands)
- E. a. sangira (Sangi)
- E. a. zita (Sulawesi)
- E. a. lorquini (Sulawesi)
