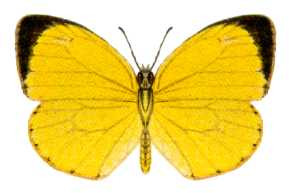

Scientific classification
- Kingdom: Animalia
- Phylum: Arthropoda
- Class: Insecta
- Order: Lepidoptera
- Family: Pieridae
- Genus: Eurema
- Species: E. herla

Binomial name
- Eurema herla (WS Macleay, 1826)

Synonyms
- Pieris herla Macleay, 1826; Terias sinta Wallace, 1867; Terias hespera Butler, 1886; Terias immaculata Miskin, 1889

= Eurema herla =

Pink grass yellow

Species of butterfly

Eurema herla, also more commonly called the Pink Grass-Yellow or Macleay's Grass-Yellow, is a butterfly in the family Pieridae. It is found in northern and eastern Australia.

Adults are mostly yellow with an evenly rounded black area on the tips of its forewings Additionally, it had black dots on the edges of its hindwings where its veins end and the underside of its hindwings are a yellowish orange. The wingspan is about 30 mm (1.2 in).

The larvae feed on Chamaecrista mimosoides, also known as the Dwarf Cassia.
