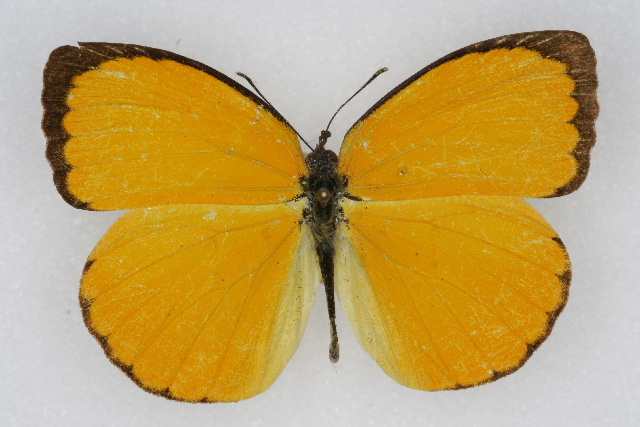

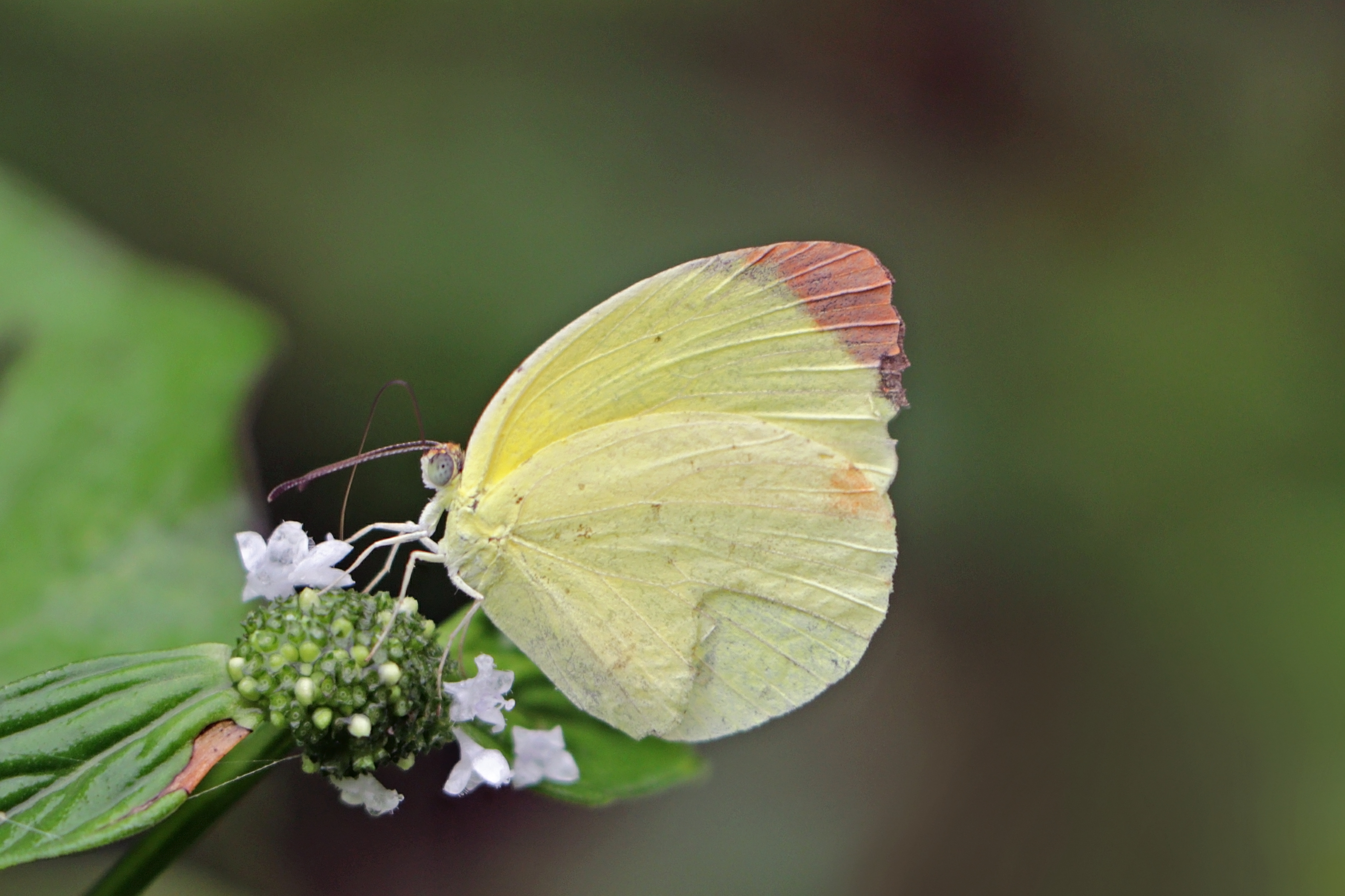
- P. d. westwoodi, Panama

Conservation status
- Secure (NatureServe)

Scientific classification
- Kingdom: Animalia
- Phylum: Arthropoda
- Clade: Pancrustacea
- Class: Insecta
- Order: Lepidoptera
- Family: Pieridae
- Genus: Eurema
- Species: E. dina

Binomial name
- Eurema dina (Poey, 1832)

Synonyms
- Terias dina Poey, 1832; Pyrisitia dina; Terias citrina Poey, [1852]; Terias westwoodi Boisduval, 1836; Terias calceolaria Butler & H. Druce, 1872

= Eurema dina =

Species of butterfly

Eurema dina, the dina yellow, is a butterfly in the family Pieridae. The species was first described by Felipe Poey in 1832. It is found from Panama north to southern Florida.

The wingspan is 32–57 mm (1.3–2.2 in).Adults are on wing year round in southern Florida. Strays can be found in southern Texas in November and southern Arizona in October. Adults feed on flower nectar of Lantana, Asclepias and small-flowered Asteraceae species in South America.

The larvae feed on Alvaradoa amorphoides in Florida and Picramnia species in Central America.

== Subspecies ==
The following subspecies are recognized:

- E. d. dina (Cuba)
- E. d. westwoodi (Boisduval, 1836) (Mexico, Costa Rica, Honduras, Panama)
- E. d. parvumbra (Kaye, 1925) (Jamaica)
- E. d. helios Bates, 1934 (Bahamas)
- E. d. bayobanex Bates, 1939 (Haiti)
