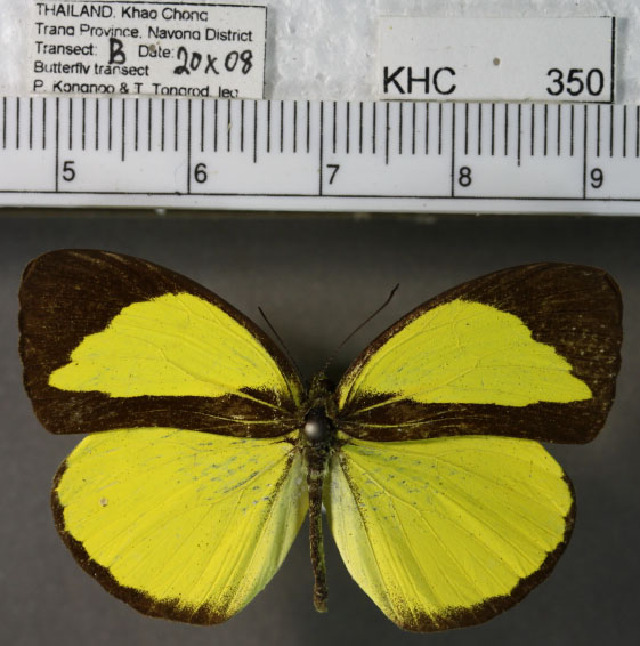
- Dorsal view
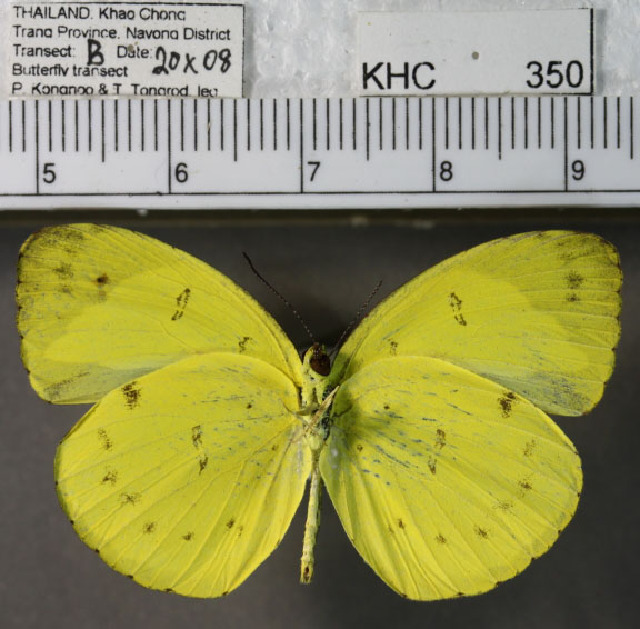
- Ventral view

Scientific classification
- Kingdom: Animalia
- Phylum: Arthropoda
- Clade: Pancrustacea
- Class: Insecta
- Order: Lepidoptera
- Family: Pieridae
- Genus: Eurema
- Species: E. nicevillei

Binomial name
- Eurema nicevillei (Butler, 1898)

Synonyms
- Terias nicevillei Butler, 1898; Eurema tilaha nicevillei

= Eurema nicevillei =

Malayan grass yellow

Species of butterfly

Eurema nicevillei, the Malayan grass yellow, is a butterfly in the family Pieridae. It is found in Thailand, southern Burma, Peninsular Malaysia, Borneo, and Sumatra.

The length of the forewings is 12–24 mm (0.47–0.94 in).

The name honours Lionel de Niceville
