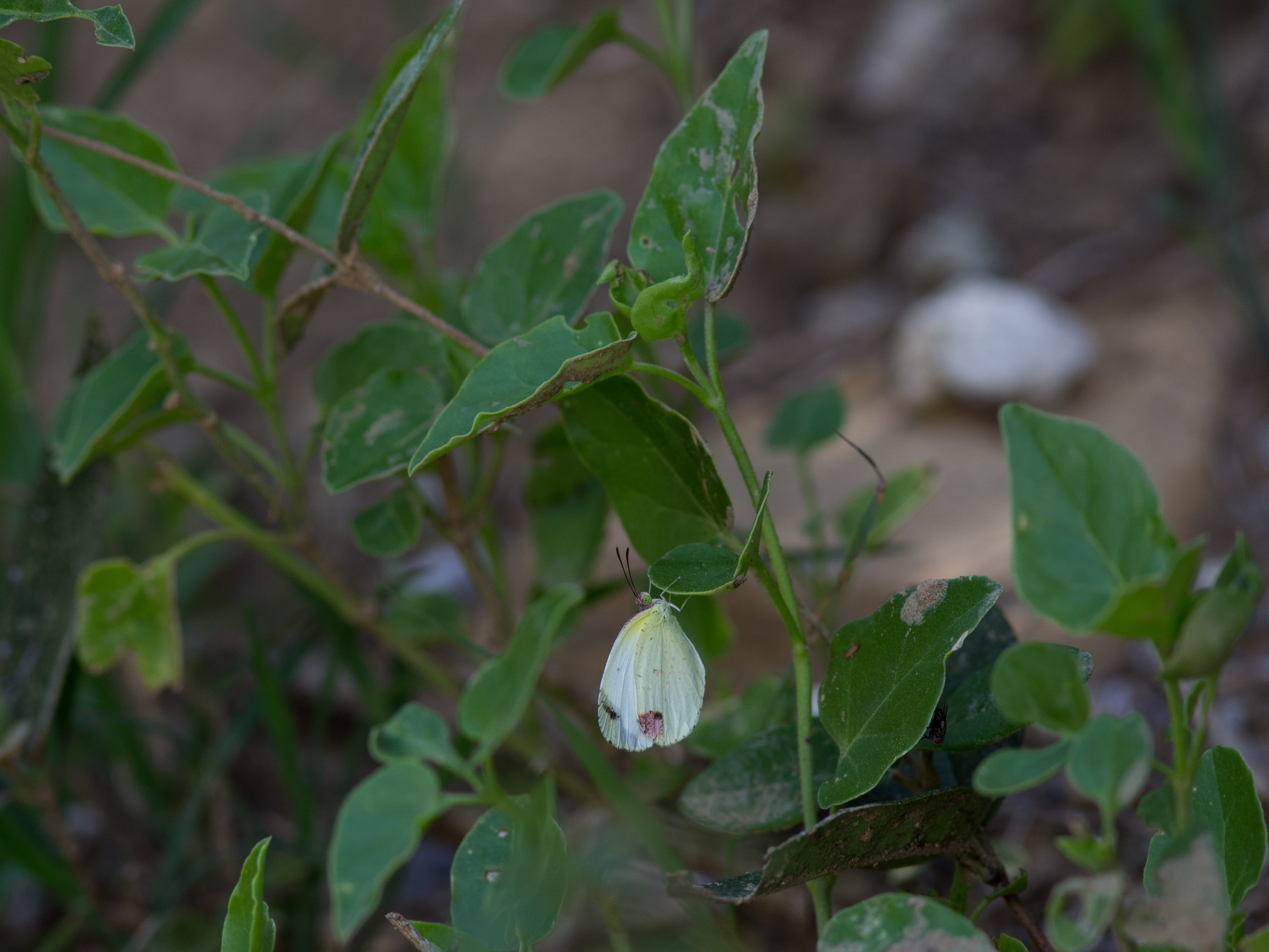

Scientific classification
- Kingdom: Animalia
- Phylum: Arthropoda
- Class: Insecta
- Order: Lepidoptera
- Family: Pieridae
- Genus: Eurema
- Species: E. messalina

Binomial name
- Eurema messalina (Fabricius, 1787)

Synonyms
- Papilio messalina Fabricius, 1787; Pyrisitia messalina; Terias bulaea Boisduval, 1836; Terias gnathene Boisduval, [1836]; Terias iradia Poey, [1852]; Terias blakei Maynard, 1891

= Eurema messalina =

Shy yellow

Species of butterfly

Eurema messalina, the shy yellow, is a butterfly in the family Pieridae. It is native to the West Indies, but a very rare stray may be found in southern Florida. The habitat consists of shady, brushy areas.

The wingspan is 26–38 mm (1.0–1.5 in). Adults are on wing from May to August and in February. Adults feed on flower nectar.

The larvae feed on Desmodium and Cassia species.
