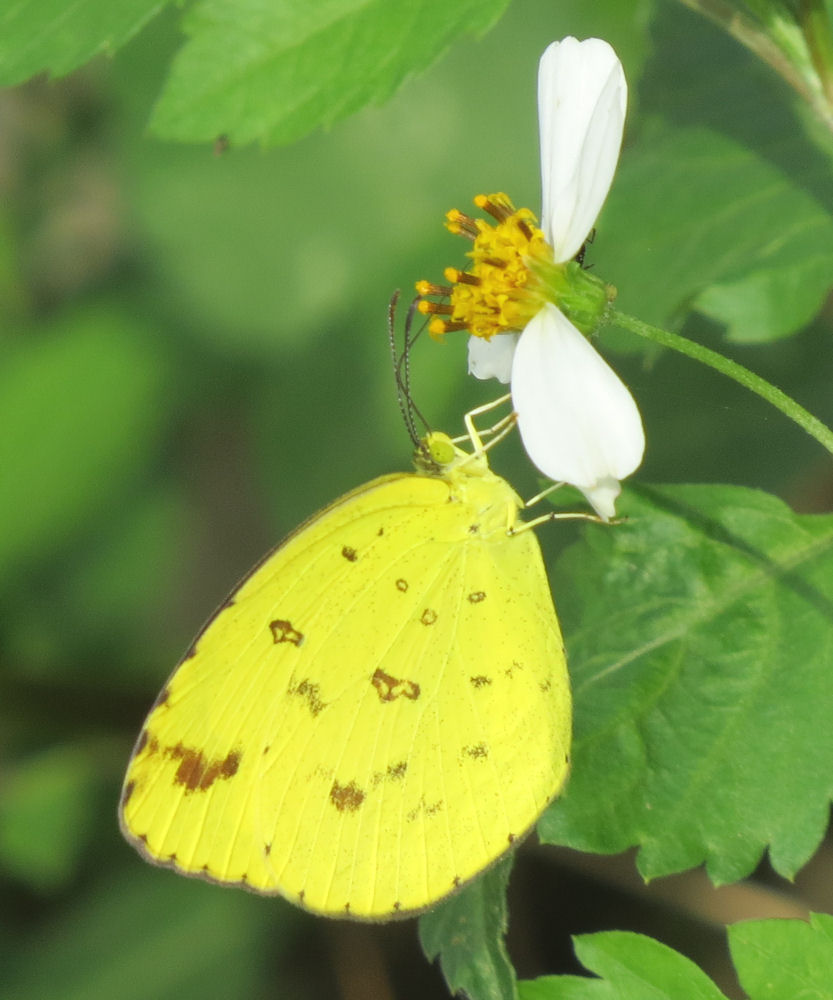
- Eurema sari sodalis, ventral view, Vietnam

Scientific classification
- Kingdom: Animalia
- Phylum: Arthropoda
- Class: Insecta
- Order: Lepidoptera
- Family: Pieridae
- Genus: Eurema
- Species: E. sari

Binomial name
- Eurema sari (Horsfield, [1829])

Synonyms
- Terias sari Horsfield, [1829]; Terias sodalis Moore, 1886

= Eurema sari =

Chocolate grass yellow

Species of butterfly

Eurema sari, the chocolate grass yellow, is a butterfly in the family Pieridae. It is found in Southeast Asia.

The wingspan is 36–42 mm (1.4–1.7 in). Adults have a distinct brown apex on the underside of the forewing.

The larvae feed on Leguminosae species.

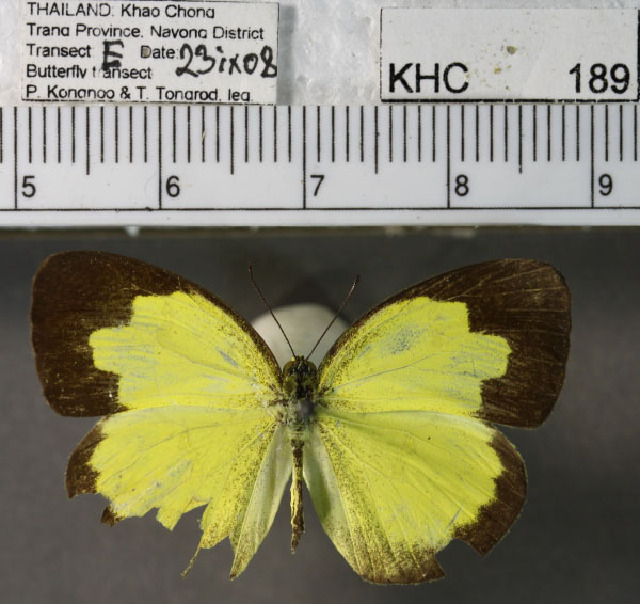
Dorsal view

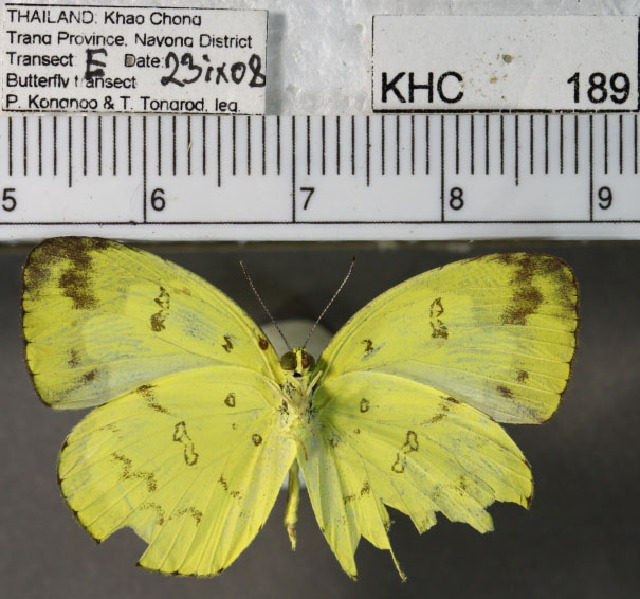
Ventral view

== Subspecies ==
The following subspecies are recognised:

- Eurema sari curiosa (Swinhoe, [1885]) – (India)
- Eurema sari obucola (Fruhstorfer, 1910) – (southern Borneo, Natuna, Palawan)
- Eurema sari sari – (Java)
- Eurema sari sodalis (Moore, 1886) – (southern Burma, Peninsular Malaya, Singapore, Thailand, Indo-China, Sumatra, northern Borneo)
- Eurema sari thyreus (Fruhstorfer, 1910) – (Enggano)
