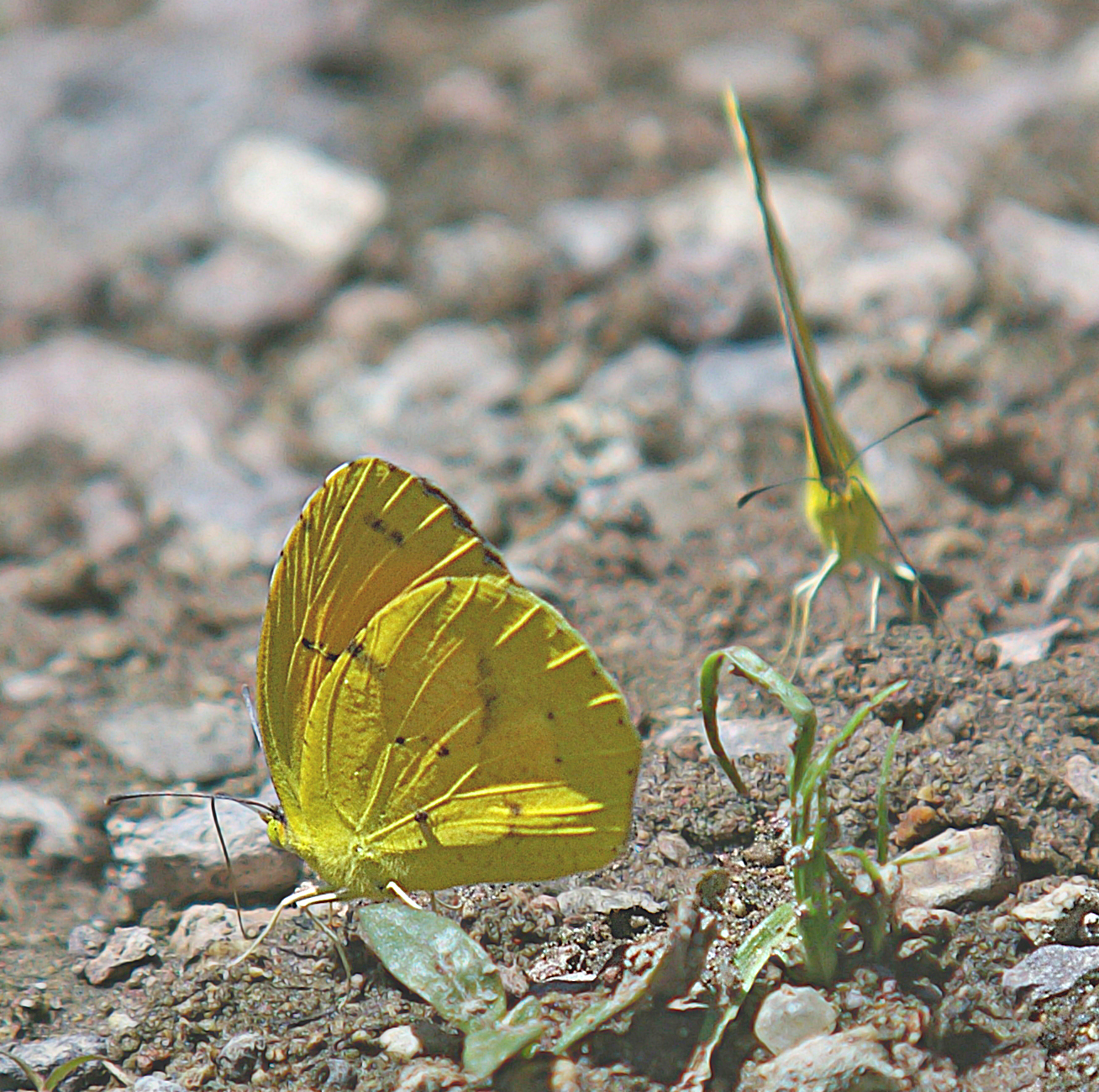

Conservation status
- Secure (NatureServe)

Scientific classification
- Kingdom: Animalia
- Phylum: Arthropoda
- Clade: Pancrustacea
- Class: Insecta
- Order: Lepidoptera
- Family: Pieridae
- Genus: Eurema
- Species: E. boisduvaliana

Binomial name
- Eurema boisduvaliana (C. & R. Felder, [1865])

Synonyms
- Terias boisduvaliana C. & R. Felder, [1865]; Eurema boisduvalianum; Pyrisita boisduvaliana; Terias ingrata R. Felder, 1869

= Eurema boisduvaliana =

Species of butterfly

Eurema boisduvaliana, commonly known as Boisduval's yellow, is a butterfly in the family Pieridae. It is found from Costa Rica north to Mexico. Rare strays may be found in southern Florida, but it is a regular migrant to south-eastern Arizona, south-western New Mexico, and southern Texas. The habitat consists of subtropical forests and forest edges, scrubs, roadsides and pastures.

The wingspan is 38–51 mm (1.5–2.0 in). Adults are on wing from April to November in southern Texas and northward. They are on wing year round in the tropics. Adults feed on flower nectar.

The larvae feed on Cassia species.

== Taxonomy ==
Eurema boisduvaliana is treated as a subspecies of Eurema arbela by most authors.
