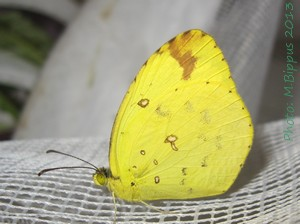
- Eurema floricola ssp. ceres

Scientific classification
- Kingdom: Animalia
- Phylum: Arthropoda
- Class: Insecta
- Order: Lepidoptera
- Family: Pieridae
- Genus: Eurema
- Species: E. floricola

Binomial name
- Eurema floricola (Boisduval, 1833)

Synonyms
- Xanthidia floricola Boisduval, 1833; Eurema (Terias) floricola; Terias smilacina Felder and Felder, 1865; Terias boisduvaliana Mabille, 1885; Terias arisba Mabille, 1887; Terias anjuana Butler, 1879; Terias decipiens Butler, 1879; Terias ceres Butler, 1886; Terias leonis Butler, 1886; Terias floricola nivea Berger, 1981

= Eurema floricola =

Malagasy grass yellow

Species of butterfly

Eurema floricola, the Malagasy grass yellow, is a butterfly in the family Pieridae. It is found in Sierra Leone, Ivory Coast, Ghana, Nigeria, the Democratic Republic of Congo, Burundi, Kenya, Tanzania, Zambia, Zimbabwe and on Madagascar, the Comoros, Mauritius, Réunion and the Seychelles. Its habitat consists of the forest/savanna transition zone.

The larvae feed on Desmanthus virgatus, Caesalpinia bonducella, Leucaena glauca, Mimosa and Entada species.

== Subspecies ==
- Eurema floricola floricola (Madagascar, eastern Tanzania)
- Eurema floricola aldabrensis Bernardi, 1969 (Seychelles)
- Eurema floricola anjuana (Butler, 1879) (Comoros)
- Eurema floricola ceres (Butler, 1886) (Mauritius, Reunion)
- Eurema floricola leonis (Butler, 1886) (Sierra Leone, Ivory Coast, Ghana, Nigeria, Democratic Republic of Congo, Burundi, Kenya, western Tanzania, Zambia)
