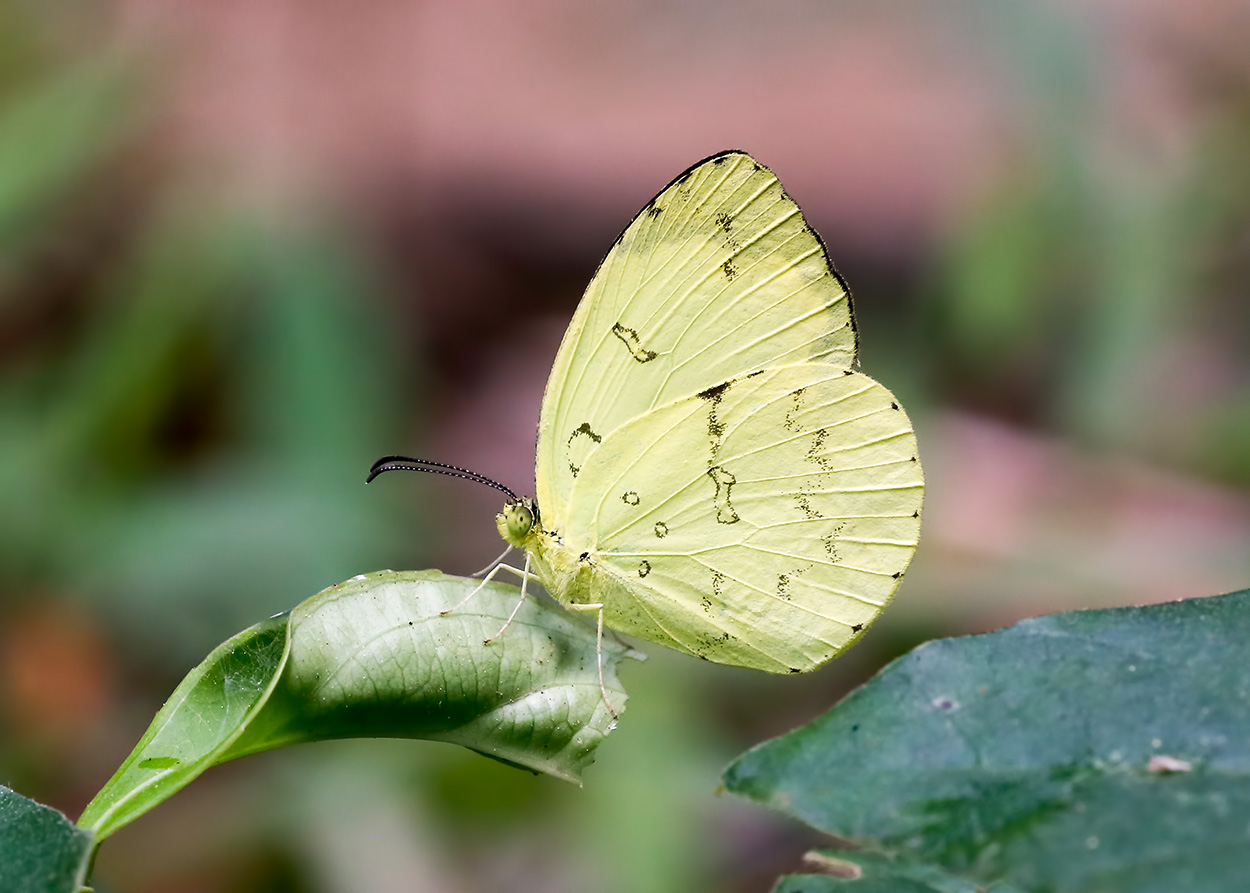

Scientific classification
- Kingdom: Animalia
- Phylum: Arthropoda
- Clade: Pancrustacea
- Class: Insecta
- Order: Lepidoptera
- Family: Pieridae
- Genus: Eurema
- Species: E. ada

Binomial name
- Eurema ada (Distant & Pryor), 1887

Synonyms
- Terias ada

= Eurema ada =

Species of butterfly

Eurema ada, the Talbot's Grass Yellow, is a species of butterfly in the genus Eurema. It was discovered in northern Borneo and described in 1871. DNA studies using mitochondrial COI and nuclear 28S rDNA show that Eurema ada is closely related to Eurema andersoni. Its main distinctive features are that its ground color is pale sulfurous, not white, and the border margins on its wings are blacker and wider. Wingspan is 35 mm.

== Known subspecies ==
Listed alphabetically:

- E. a. choui Gu, 1994
- E. a. indosinica Yata, 1991
- E. a. iona Talbot, 1939
- E. a. prabha Fruhstorfer
- E. a. toba (de Nicéville), [1896])
- E. a. varga Fruhstorfer
- E. a. yaksha Fruhstorfer
