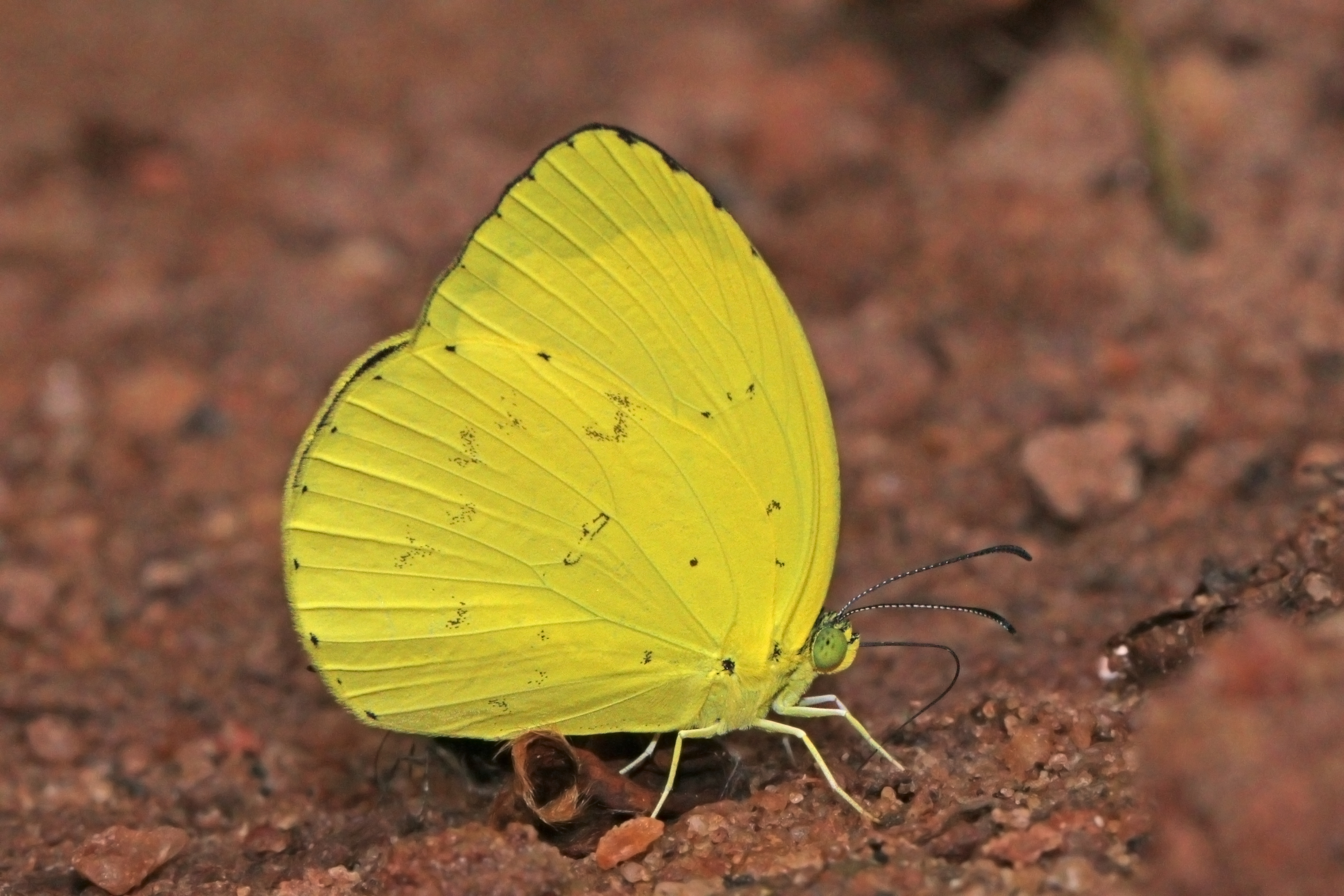
- male
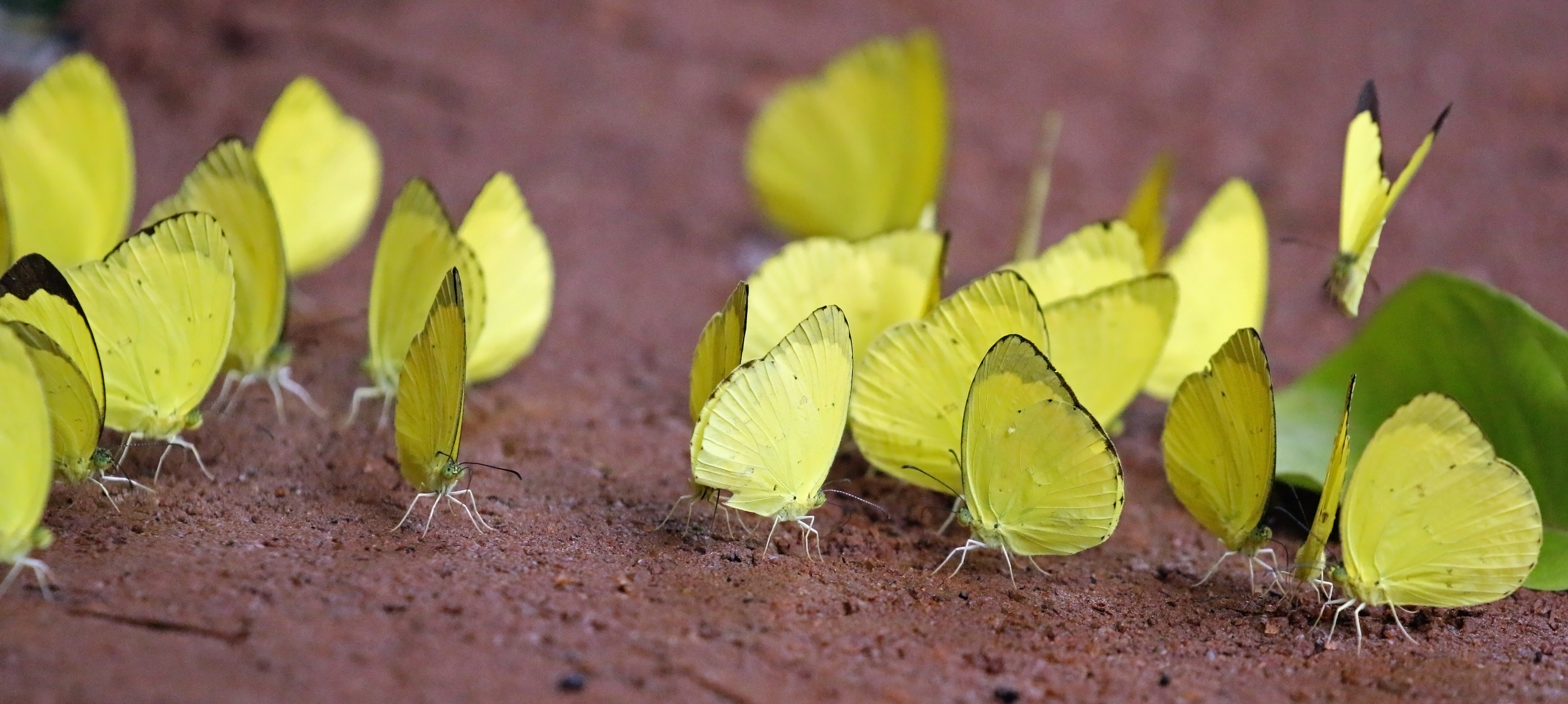
- puddling Bobiri Forest, Ghana

Scientific classification
- Kingdom: Animalia
- Phylum: Arthropoda
- Clade: Pancrustacea
- Class: Insecta
- Order: Lepidoptera
- Family: Pieridae
- Genus: Eurema
- Species: E. senegalensis

Binomial name
- Eurema senegalensis (Boisduval, [1836])

Synonyms
- Terias senegalensis Boisduval, 1836; Eurema senegalensis f. bisinuata Butler, 1876; Eurema senegalensis f. brenda Doubleday & Hewitson, 1847; Eurema senegalensis f. floricola Boisduval, 1833; Eurema senegalensis f. ceres Butler, 1886; Terias brenda Doubleday, 1847; Terias brenda f. maculata Aurivillius, 1910; Terias brenda ab. marginata Dufrane, 1947; Terias floricola ab. marginata Dufrane, 1947; Terias floricola f. ceres ab. mariae Dufrane, 1945; Terias floricola ab. hylas Stoneham, 1957

= Eurema senegalensis =

Forest grass yellow

Species of butterfly

Eurema senegalensis, the forest grass yellow, is a butterfly in the family Pieridae. It is found in Guinea (the Nimba Range), Sierra Leone, Liberia, Ivory Coast, Ghana, Togo, Benin, Nigeria, Cameroon, Equatorial Guinea, the Republic of the Congo, the Democratic Republic of the Congo, western Uganda, western Kenya, Tanzania, Zambia, and Madagascar.. The habitat consists of forests and heavy woodland.

The larvae feed on Hypericum aethiopicum, Acacia, Cassia (including Cassia mimosoides) and Albizia gummifera

Torben Larsen developed a species numbering system for his 2005 publication Butterflies of West Africa. This species is #38. The 'Larsen' numbers have since been used with permission in A Sharp Eye on Butterflies of Ghana.
