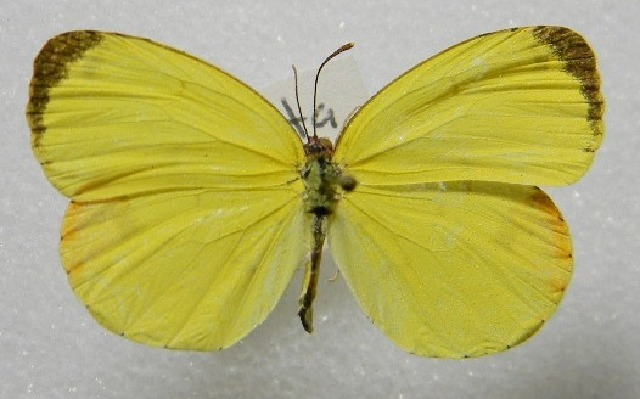
- Female, dorsal view
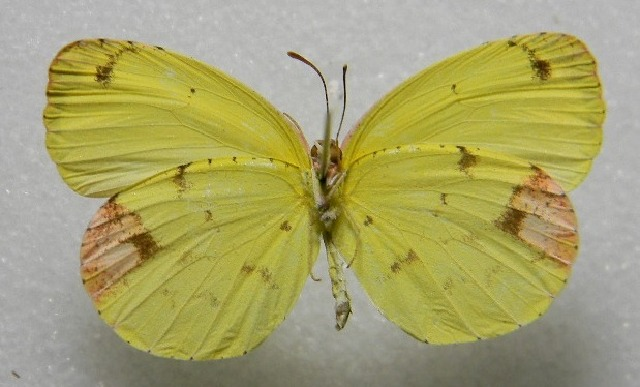
- Female, ventral view

Scientific classification
- Kingdom: Animalia
- Phylum: Arthropoda
- Class: Insecta
- Order: Lepidoptera
- Family: Pieridae
- Genus: Eurema
- Species: E. portoricensis

Binomial name
- Eurema portoricensis (Dewitz, 1877)

Synonyms
- Terias portoricensis Dewitz, 1877; Pyrisitia portoricensis; Terias tenera Avinoff, 1926

= Eurema portoricensis =

Puerto Rican yellow

Species of butterfly

Eurema portoricensis, the Puerto Rican yellow, is a butterfly in the family Pieridae. It is found in Puerto Rico.

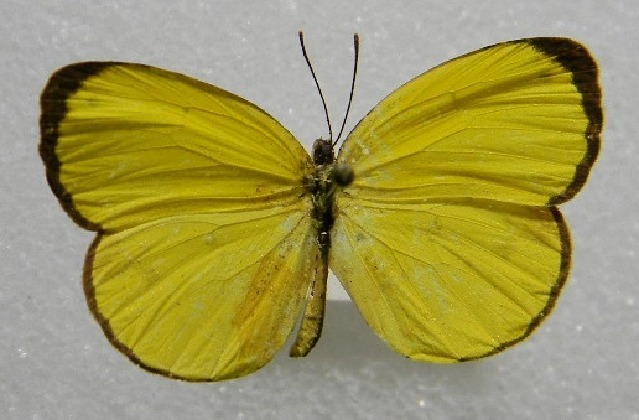
Male, dorsal view

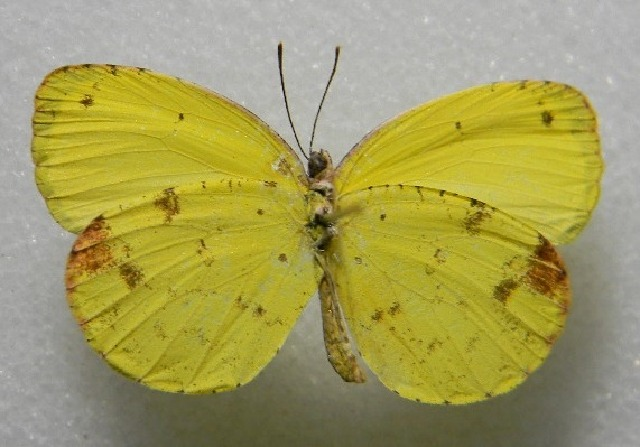
Male, ventral view

The larvae feed on Senna obtusifolia, Senna alata, and Chamaecrista nictitans patellaria var. glabrata.
