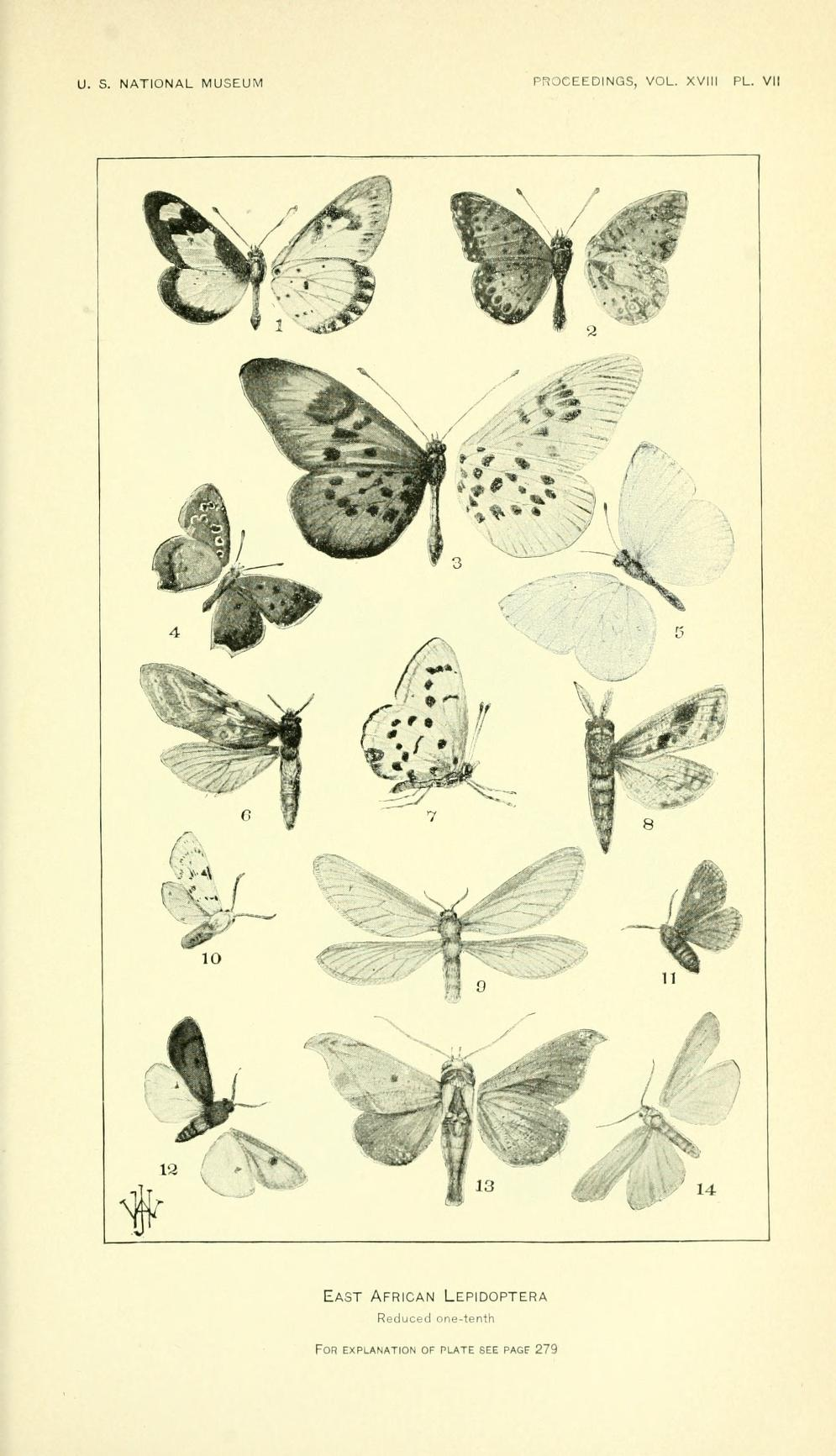
- Eurema mandarinula in Holland (figure 5)

Scientific classification
- Kingdom: Animalia
- Phylum: Arthropoda
- Clade: Pancrustacea
- Class: Insecta
- Order: Lepidoptera
- Family: Pieridae
- Genus: Eurema
- Species: E. mandarinula

Binomial name
- Eurema mandarinula (Holland, 1892)

Synonyms
- Terias mandarinula Holland, 1892; Eurema (Eurema) mandarinula; Terias punctinotata Butler, 1895

= Eurema mandarinula =

Species of butterfly

Eurema mandarinula, the mandarin grass yellow, is a butterfly in the family Pieridae. It is found in Democratic Republic of Congo, Rwanda, Burundi, Uganda, Kenya, Tanzania, north-eastern Zambia and Malawi. The habitat consists of semi-montane grassy areas in and around forests.
