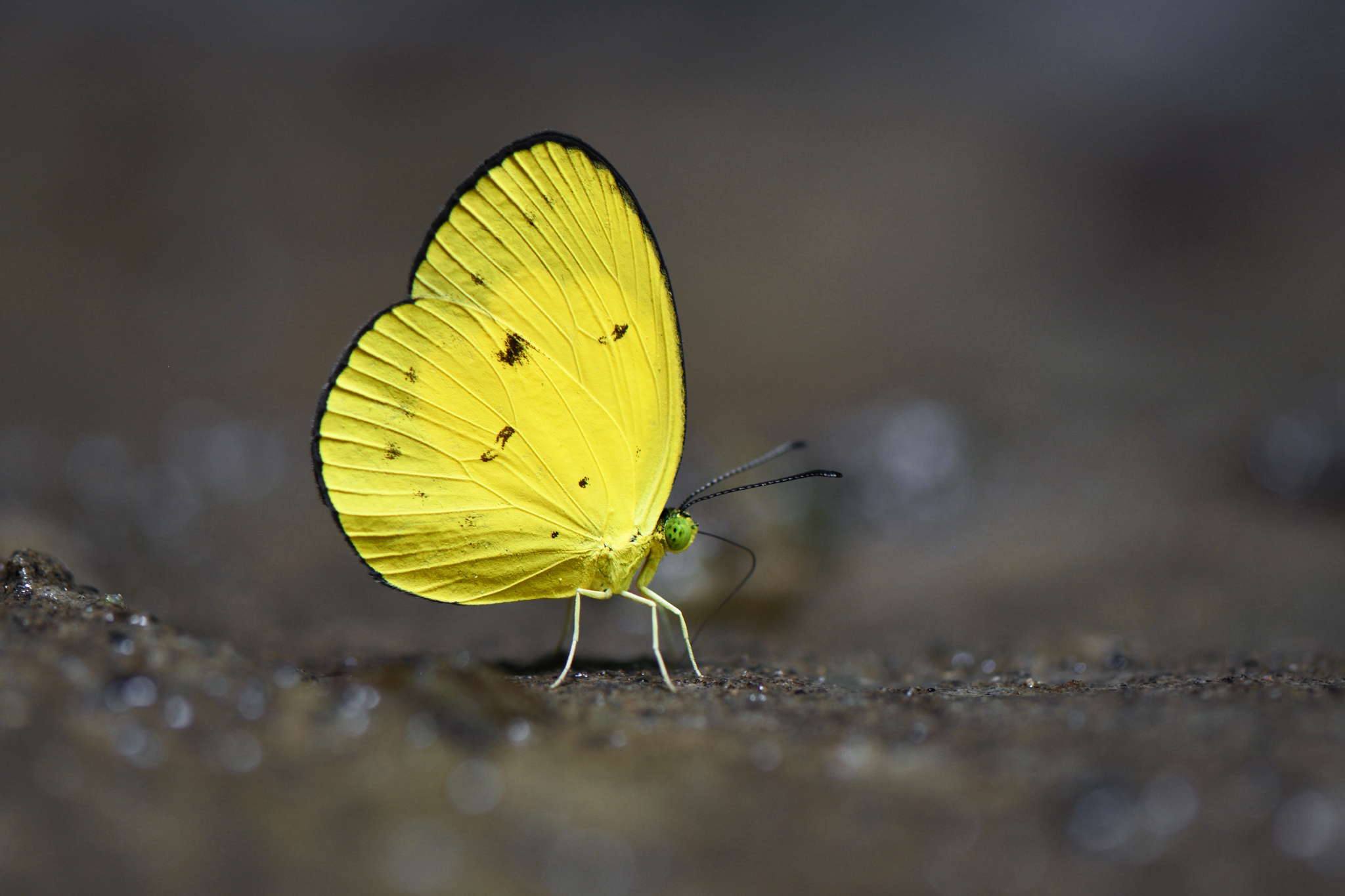

Scientific classification
- Kingdom: Animalia
- Phylum: Arthropoda
- Class: Insecta
- Order: Lepidoptera
- Family: Pieridae
- Genus: Eurema
- Species: E. celebensis

Binomial name
- Eurema celebensis (Wallace, 1867)

Synonyms
- Terias celebensis Wallace, 1867

= Eurema celebensis =

Species of butterfly

Eurema celebensis is a small butterfly of the family Pieridae. It is found in the Sula Islands Regency, Indonesia, on the islands of Sulawesi and Sula. It was first described by Alfred Russel Wallace and named Terias celebensis.

== Description ==
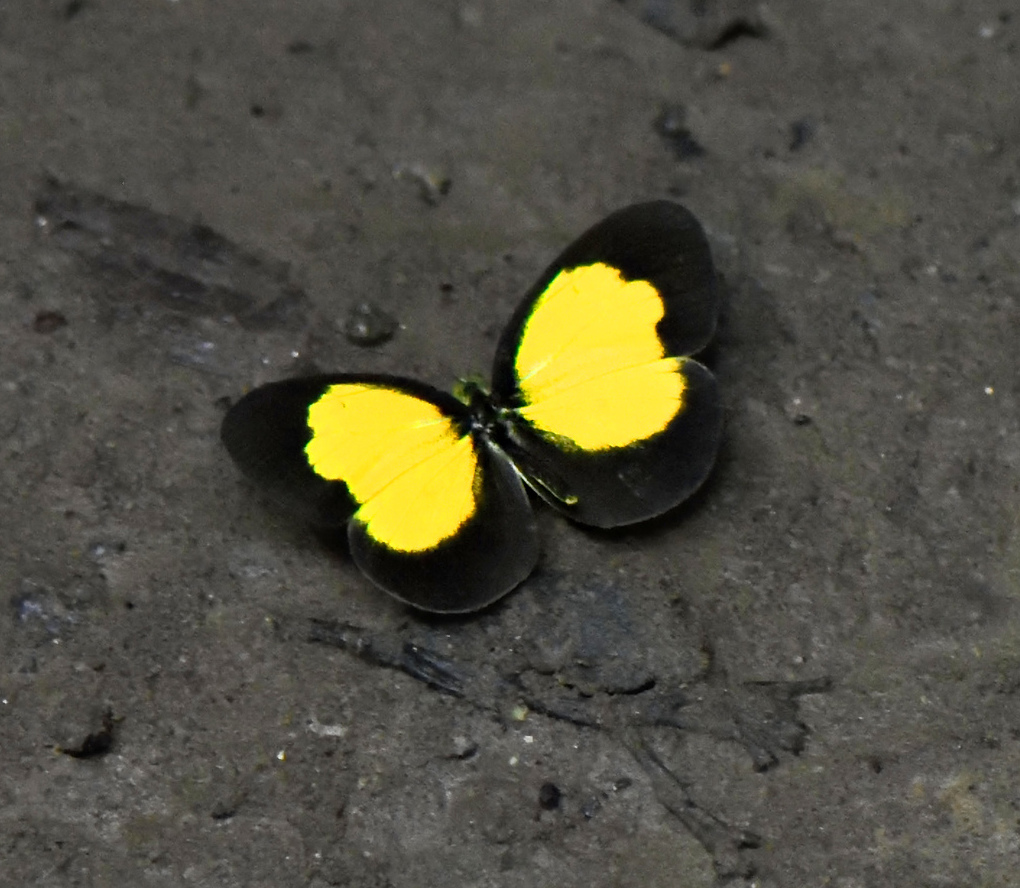

Wallace originally described the species as follows:

Male. — Above, black, with a suborbicular yellow patch extending from near the costa of the upper wings to just below the cell of the lower wings, twice sinuated towards the apex of the uppers, elsewhere regularly curved. Beneath, yellow, with spots arranged as in T. tominia. Female. — Dusky black, with a small subovate yellow patch across the end of the cell of the upper wings. The lower wings with the inner margin yellow, extending in an ovate patch between the cell and the outer angle.
