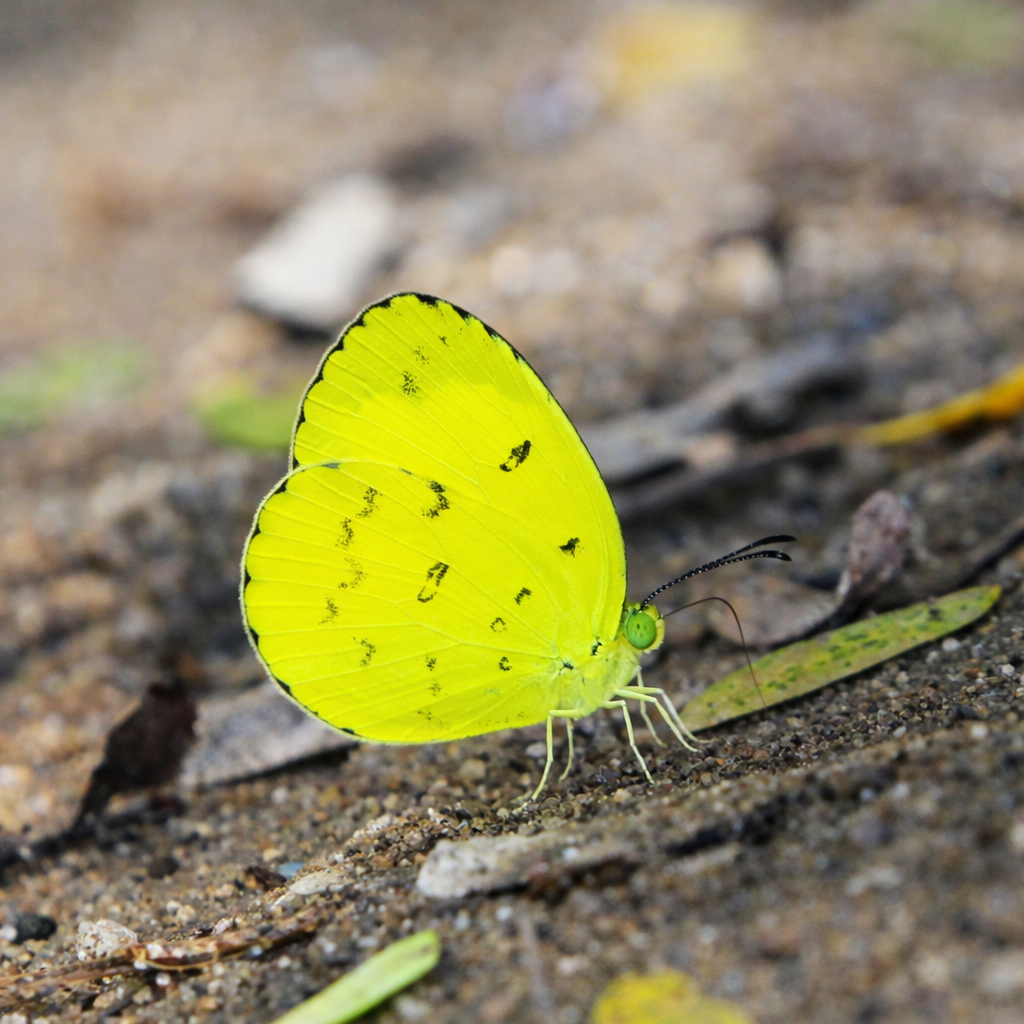
- from Matale

Scientific classification
- Kingdom: Animalia
- Phylum: Arthropoda
- Clade: Pancrustacea
- Class: Insecta
- Order: Lepidoptera
- Family: Pieridae
- Genus: Eurema
- Species: E. ormistoni

Binomial name
- Eurema ormistoni (Watkins, 1925)

Synonyms
- Eurema andersoni ormistoni Watkins

= Eurema ormistoni =

Species of butterfly

Eurema ormistoni, the Sri Lanka one-spot grass yellow, is a small butterfly of the family Pieridae, that is, the yellows and whites. It is endemic to the island of Sri Lanka.

== Description ==
Wingspan is 35–40 mm.
