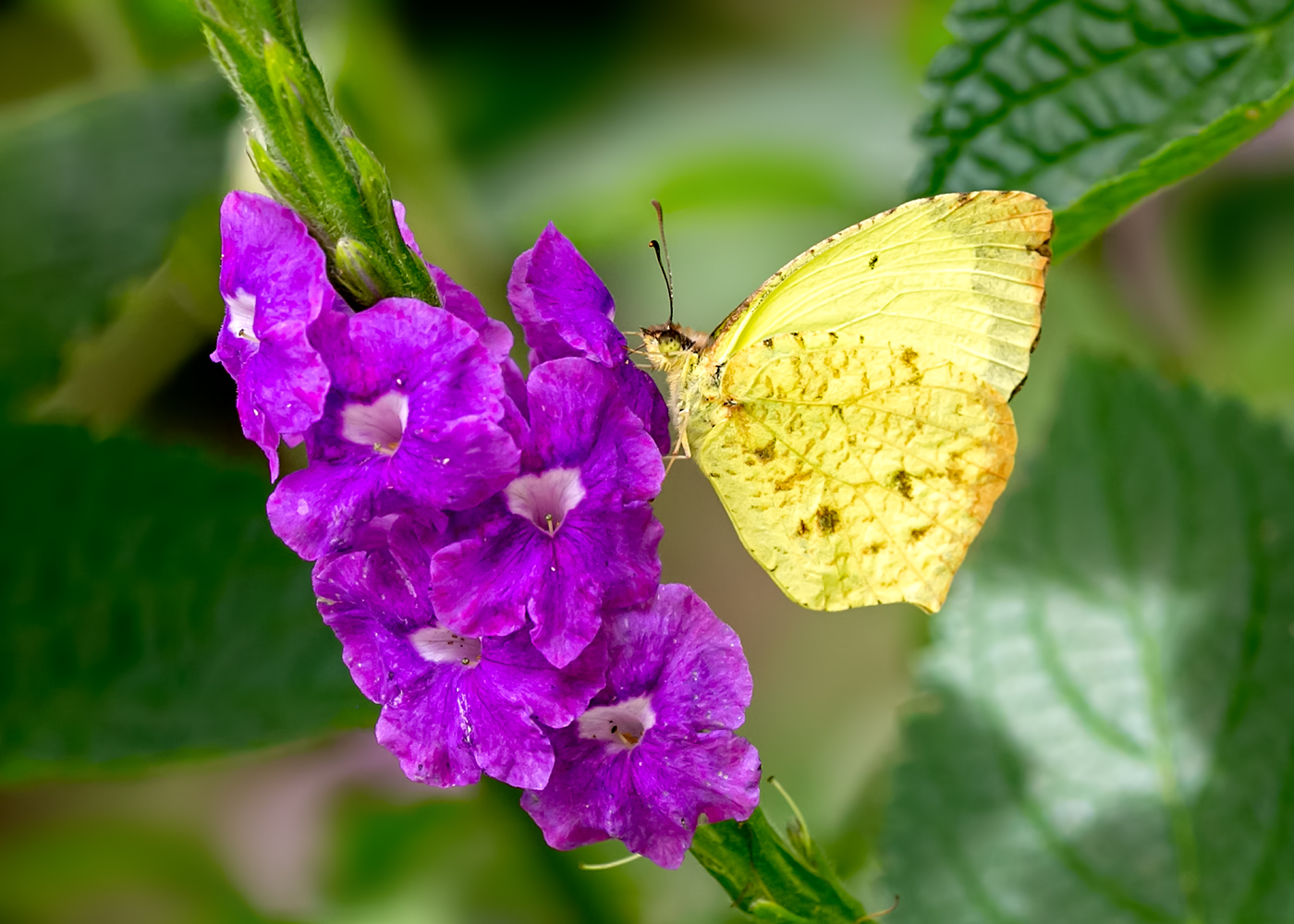

Scientific classification
- Kingdom: Animalia
- Phylum: Arthropoda
- Clade: Pancrustacea
- Class: Insecta
- Order: Lepidoptera
- Family: Pieridae
- Genus: Eurema
- Species: E. salome

Binomial name
- Eurema salome (C. & R. Felder, 1861)

Synonyms
- Terias salome C. & R. Felder, 1861; Terias arbela ab. lurida d'Almeida, 1928; Terias salome saba Bryk, 1953; Terias salome limoneus C. & R. Felder, 1861; Terias limonia Ménétriés, 1857 (nom. nud.); Terias gaugamela C. & R. Felder, [1865]; Eurema damarina Staudinger, 1889; Terias mexicana henricii Apolinar, 1926; Terias jamapa Reakirt, 1866; Eurema xystra

= Eurema salome =

Salome yellow

Species of butterfly

Eurema salome, the Salome yellow, is a butterfly in the family Pieridae. It is found from Peru northward through tropical America. It is an extremely rare migrant to the lower Rio Grande Valley in Texas. The habitat consists of forest openings and edges and roadcuts.

The wingspan is 47–57 mm (1.9–2.2 in). Adults are on wing from August to September in southern Texas and all year round in the tropics. Adults feed on flower nectar of a wide variety of flowers.

The larvae feed on Diphysa species.

== Subspecies ==
The following subspecies are recognized:

- E. s. salome (Peru)
- E. s. limoneus (C. & R. Felder, 1861) (Venezuela)
- E. s. gaugamela (C. & R. Felder, [1865]) (Colombia, Venezuela)
- E. s. jamapa (Reakirt, 1866) (Mexico)
- E. s. xystra (d'Almeida, 1936) (Ecuador)
