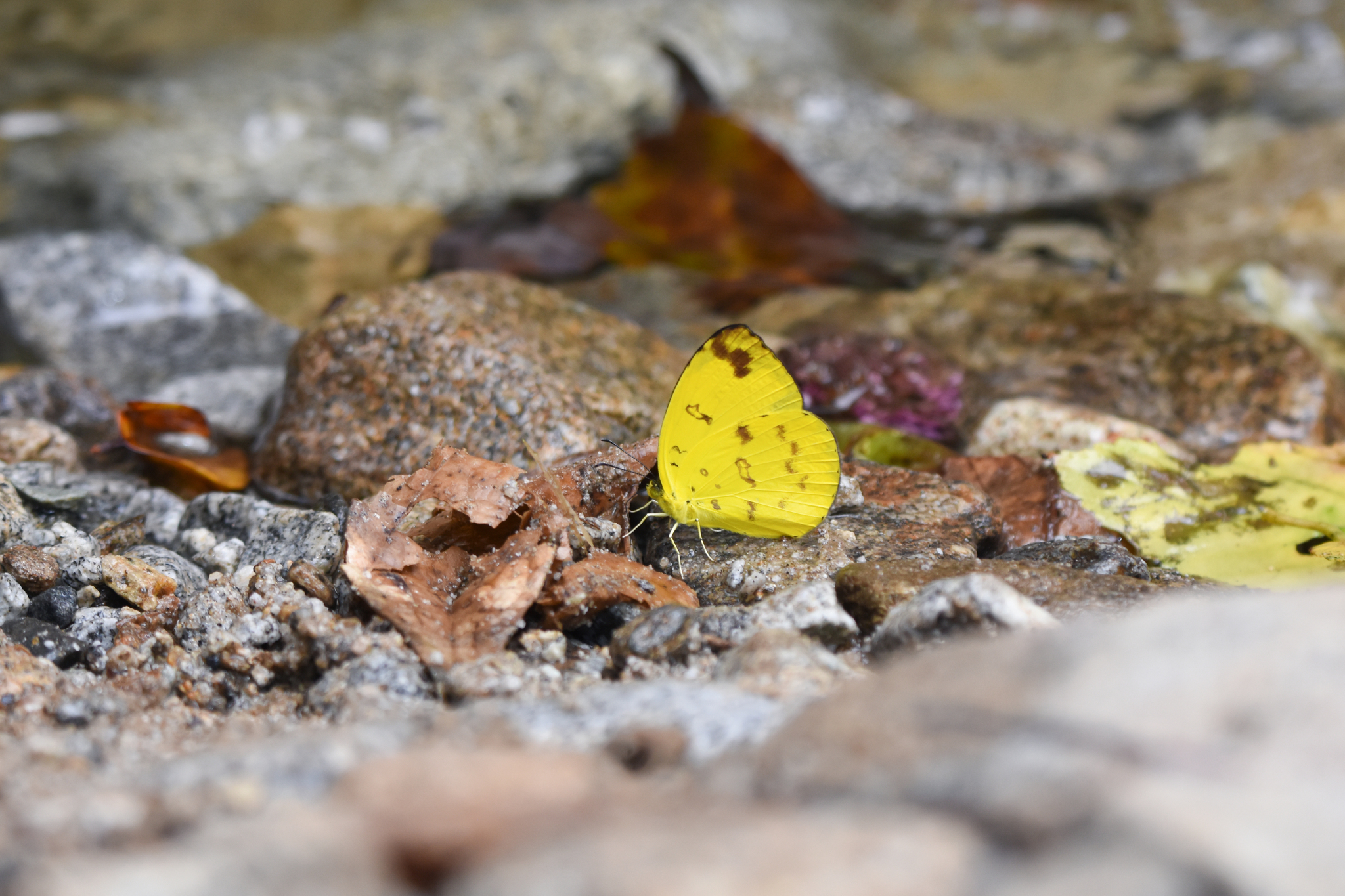

Scientific classification
- Kingdom: Animalia
- Phylum: Arthropoda
- Class: Insecta
- Order: Lepidoptera
- Family: Pieridae
- Genus: Eurema
- Species: E. messalina

Binomial name
- Eurema messalina Corbet & Pendlebury, 1932

Synonyms
- Eurema simulatrix irena

= Eurema irena =

Species of insect

Eurema irena is a butterfly in the family Pieridae. It is endemic to Sulawesi.
