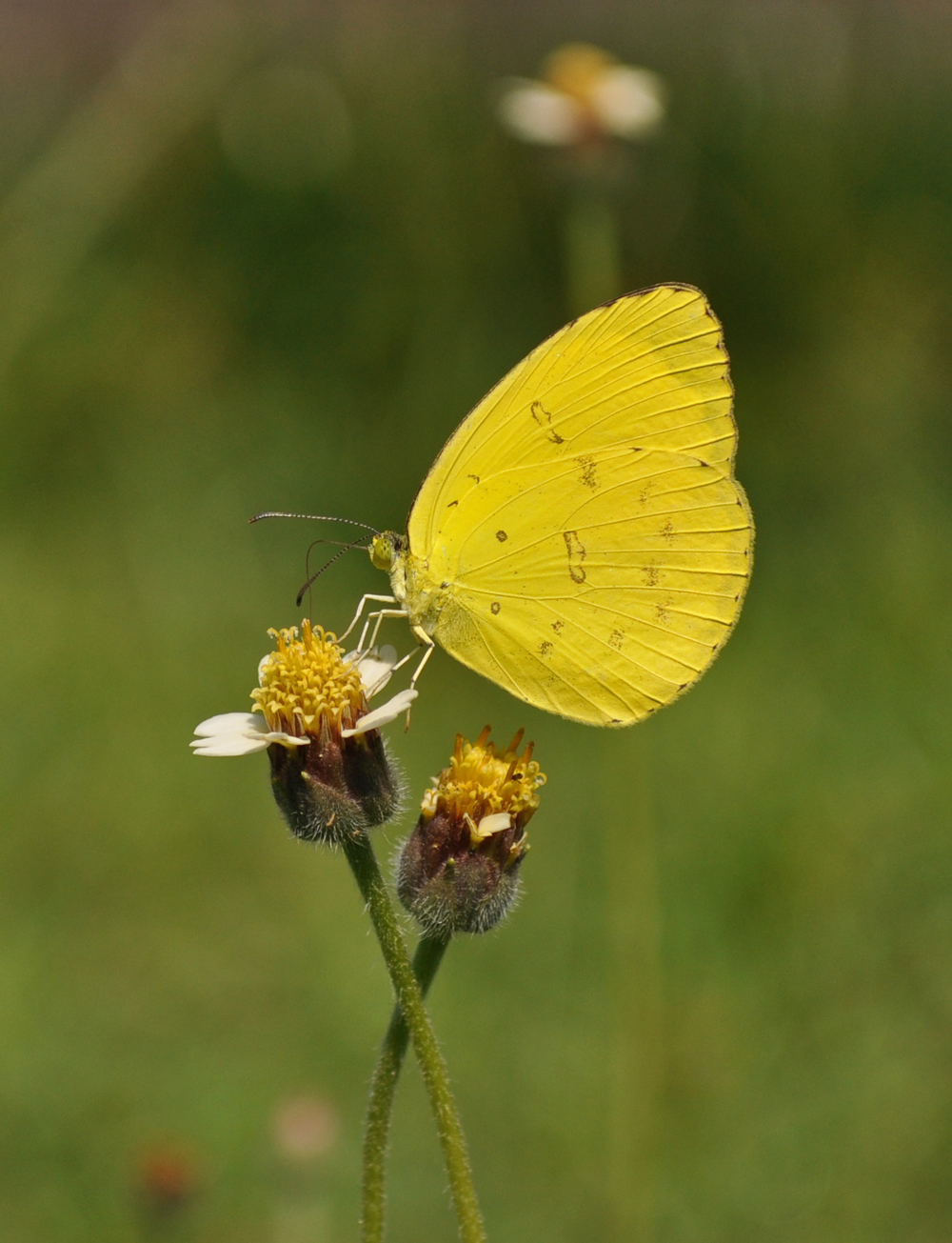
- Eurema blanda

Scientific classification
- Kingdom: Animalia
- Phylum: Arthropoda
- Clade: Pancrustacea
- Class: Insecta
- Order: Lepidoptera
- Family: Pieridae
- Subfamily: Coliadinae
- Tribe: Euremini
- Genus: Eurema; Hübner, [1819]

Type species
- Eurema daira Cramer, 1780

Species
- c. 70, see text

Synonyms
- Abaeis Hübner, [1819]; Terias Swainson, [1821]; Xanthidia Boisduval & Le Conte, [1829]; Lucidia Lacordaire, 1833; Heurema Agassiz, [1847]; Pyrisitia Butler, 1870; Sphaenogona Butler, 1870; Maiva Grose-Smith & Kirby, 1893; Kibreeta Moore, [1906]; Nirmula Moore, [1906]; Teriocolias Röber, [1909]

= Eurema =

Butterfly genus in family Pieridae

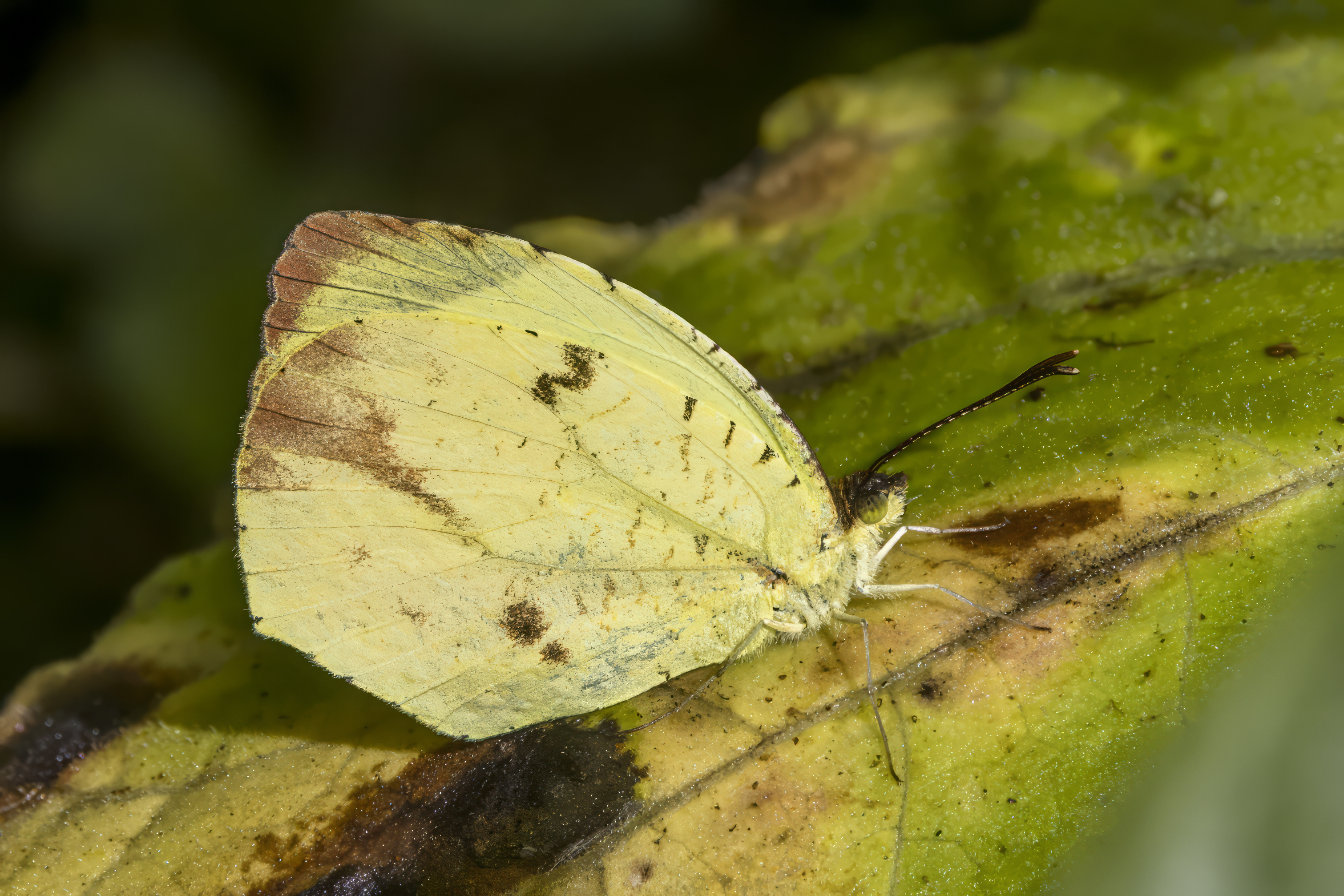
E. xantochlora xantochlora - tropical yellow, Colombia

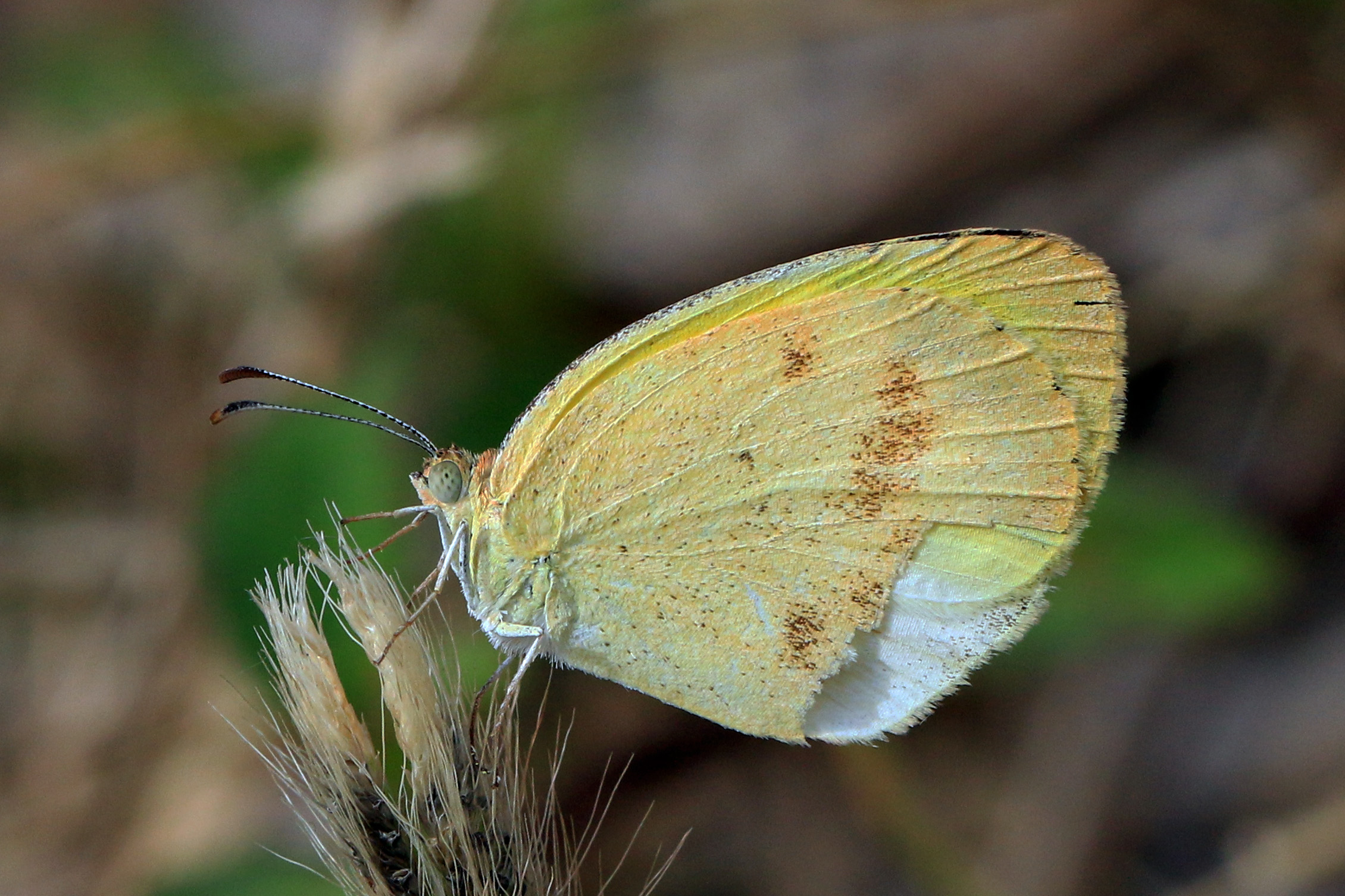
E. elathea elathea - false barred sulphur, Grand Cayman

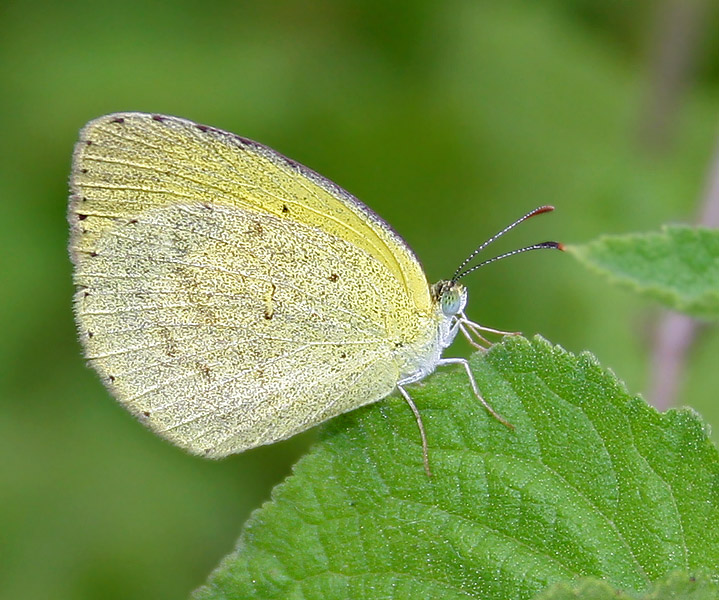
E. brigitta - small grass yellow

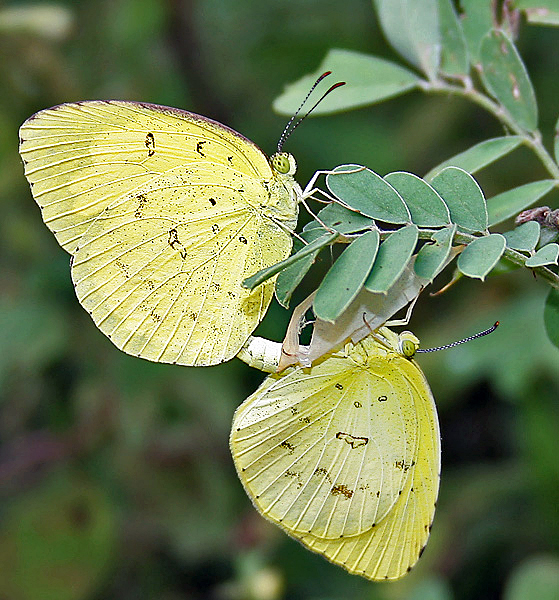
E. hecabe - common grass yellow

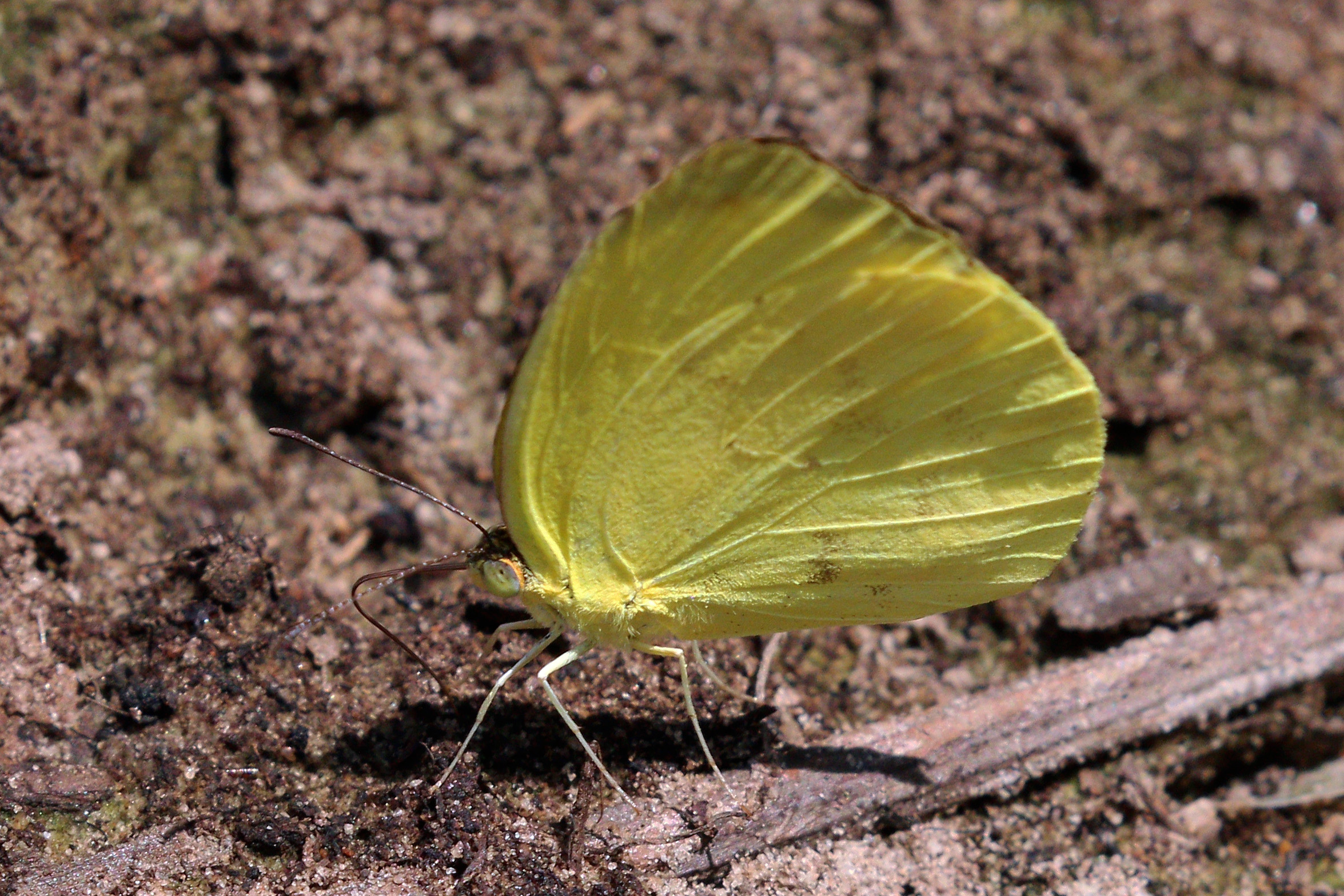
E. venusta - grass yellow, Brazil

Eurema is a widespread genus of grass yellow butterflies in the family Pieridae.

Species range from Asia, Africa, Australia, and Oceania, to the New World. The type species is the North American barred yellow (Eurema daira).

There are over 70 species in the genus, but more than 300 synonymous names have been applied to them. Some species, such as the common African grass yellow (E. hecabe) have over 80 synonyms. The genus itself has over 15 junior generic synonyms. This is the price of being a widespread taxon, as well as a zoogeographical problem.

== Species ==
Listed alphabetically within groups:

- Eurema ada (Distant & Pryer, 1887)
- Eurema alitha (C.& R. Felder, 1862) – scalloped grass yellow
- Eurema andersonii (Moore, 1886) – one-spot grass yellow
- Eurema beatrix (Toxopeus, 1939)
- Eurema blanda (Boisduval, 1836) – three-spot grass yellow
- Eurema brigitta (Stoll, [1780]) – small grass yellow or no brand grass yellow
- Eurema candida (Stoll, [1782])
- Eurema celebensis Wallace, 1867
- Eurema desjardinsii (Boisduval, 1833) – angled grass yellow
- ?Eurema ecriva (Butler, 1873)
- Eurema esakii Shirôzu, 1953
- Eurema floricola (Boisduval, 1883) – Malagasy grass yellow
- ?Eurema halmaherana Shirôzu & Yata, 1981
- Eurema hapale (Mabille, 1882) – pale grass yellow or marsh grass yellow
- Eurema hecabe (Linnaeus, 1758) – common grass yellow
- Eurema herla (Macleay, 1826) – pink grass yellow
- ?Eurema hiurae Shirozu & Yata, 1977
- Eurema lacteola (Distant, 1886) – scarce grass yellow
- Eurema laeta (Boisduval, [1836]) – spotless grass yellow
- Eurema lombokiana Fruhstorfer, 1897
- Eurema mandarinula (Holland, 1892) – mandarin grass yellow
- Eurema mentawiensis Corbet, 1942
- Eurema novapallida Yata, 1992
- Eurema nilgiriensis Yata, 1990 – Nilgiri grass yellow
- Eurema puella (Boisduval, 1832) – broad-margined grass yellow
- Eurema regularis (Butler, 1876) – regular grass yellow
- Eurema sari (Horsfield, [1829]) – chocolate grass yellow
- Eurema sarilata Semper, 1891
- Eurema senegalensis Boisduval, [1836] – forest grass yellow
- Eurema simulatrix (Semper, 1891) – changeable grass yellow
- Eurema smilax (Donovan, 1805) – small grass yellow
- Eurema tilaha (Horsfield, [1829])
- Eurema nicevillei (Butler, 1898) – Malayan grass yellow
- Eurema timorensis Shirôzu & Yata, 1977
- Eurema tominia (Vollenhoven, 1865)
- Eurema upembana (Berger, 1981)
- Eurema zamida (Fruhstorfer, 1908)

Species group:

- Eurema adamsi (Lathy, 1898)
- Eurema agave (Cramer, [1775])
- Eurema albula (Cramer, [1776]) – ghost yellow
- Eurema amelia (Poey, [1832])
- Eurema arbela Geyer, [1832]
- Eurema daira (Godart, [1819]) (type species) – barred yellow, fairy yellow, or barred sulphur
- Eurema deva (Doubleday, 1847)
- Eurema elathea (Cramer, [1777])
- Eurema fabiola (C. & R. Felder, 1861)
- Eurema lirina (Bates, 1861)
- Eurema lucina (Poey, [1852])
- Eurema mexicana (Boisduval, [1836]) – Mexican yellow
- Eurema nigrocincta Dognin, 1889
- Eurema paulina (Bates, 1861)
- Eurema phiale (Cramer, [1775])
- Eurema reticulata (Butler, 1871)
- Eurema salome (C. & R. Felder, 1861) – Salome yellow
- Eurema tupuntenem Lichy, 1976
- Eurema xantochlora (Kollar, 1850) – tropical yellow

Species group abaeis:

- Eurema nicippe (Cramer, [1779])
- Eurema nicippiformis Munroe, 1947

Species group pyrisitia:

- Eurema chamberlaini Butler, 1897
- Eurema dina (Poey, 1832) – bush sulphur or dina yellow
- Eurema euterpiformis Munroe, 1947
- Eurema leuce (Boisduval, 1836) – Hall's sulphur
- Eurema lisa (Boisduval & Leconte, 1829) – little yellow
- Eurema messalina (Fabricius, 1787) – shy yellow
- Eurema nise (Cramer, [1775]) – mimosa yellow
- Eurema portoricensis (Dewitz, 1877) – Puerto Rican yellow
- Eurema proterpia (Fabricius, 1775) – tailed orange or little jaune
- Eurema pyro (Godart, 1819)
- Eurema venusta (Boisduval, 1836)

Species group teriocolias:

- Eurema zelia (Lucas, 1852)

Unknown species group

- Eurema doris (Röber, 1909)
- Eurema irena Corbet & Pendlebury, 1932
- Eurema ormistoni (Watkins, 1925)
- Eurema raymundoi (D'Almeida, 1928)
- Eurema tondana (Felder, C & R Felder, 1865)
