= List of butterflies of North America (Pieridae) =

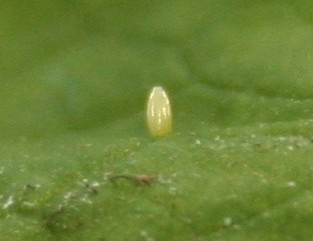
Checkered white, Pontia protodice, egg on garlic mustard

Whites and sulphurs are small to medium-sized butterflies. Their wingspans range from 0.8 to 4.0 inches (2-10.2 cm). There are about 1,000 species worldwide with about 61 species in North America. Most whites and sulphurs are white, yellow, and orange with some black, and some may be various shades of gray green. Their flight is mostly slow and fluttering, but some of the larger species have quicker flights. Both males and females like to feed at flowers, while males also like to puddle on damp ground. Male whites and sulphurs locate females by patrolling. The eggs are spindle shaped and laid singly. Most of the long-slender larvae are green or yellow. The chrysalis is usually triangular or cone headed. It hangs upright supported by a silken loop around the middle. The overwintering varies with species. It may be larva, chrysalis, or adult.

== Subfamily Pierinae: whites ==
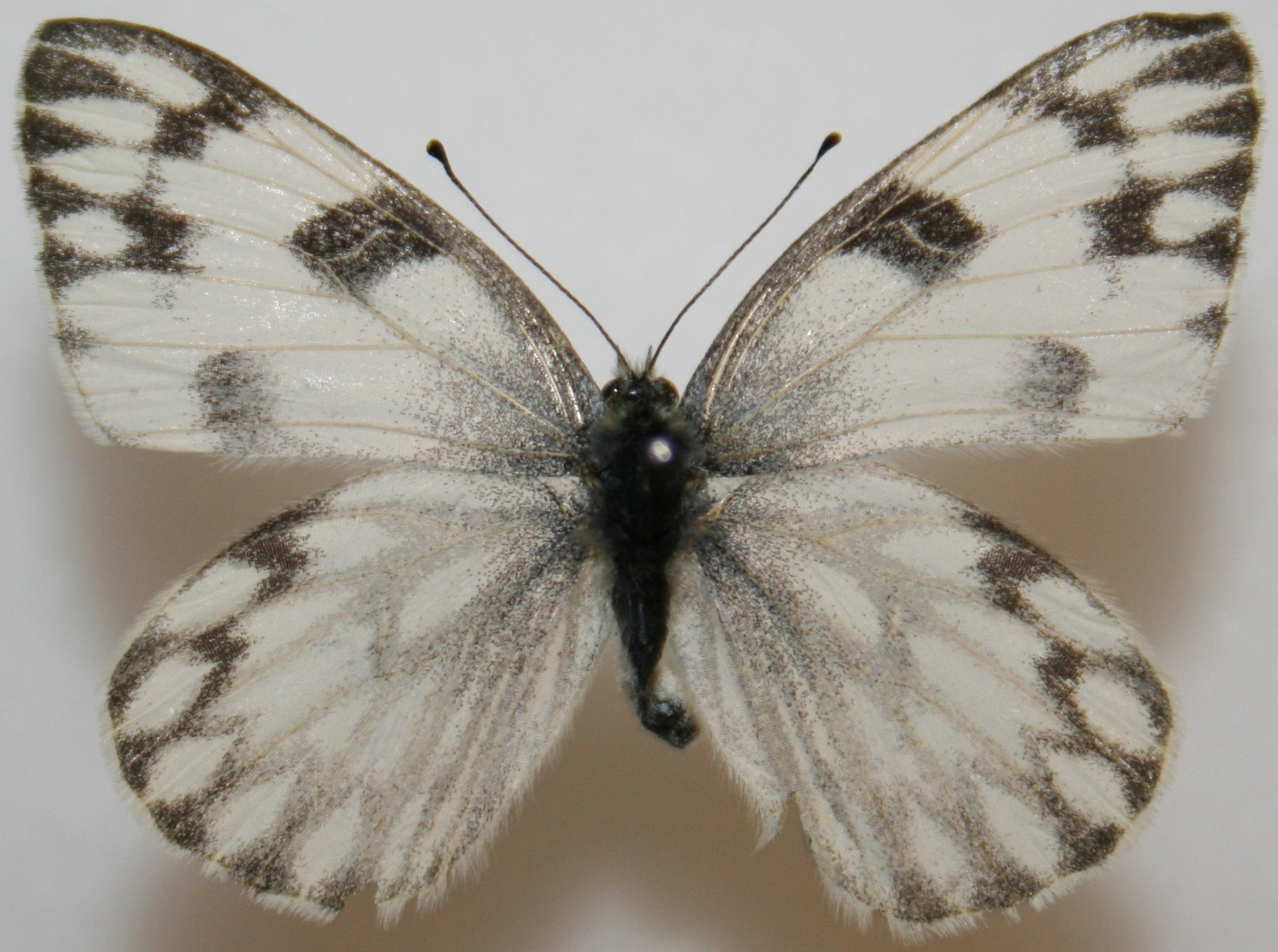
Female checkered white, Pontia protodice

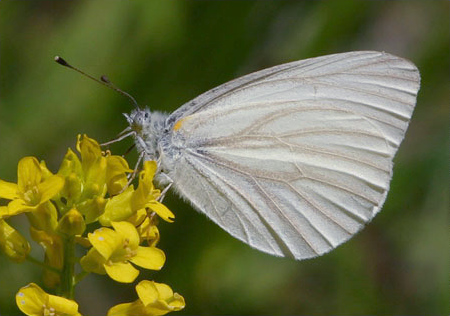
West Virginia white, Pieris virginiensis

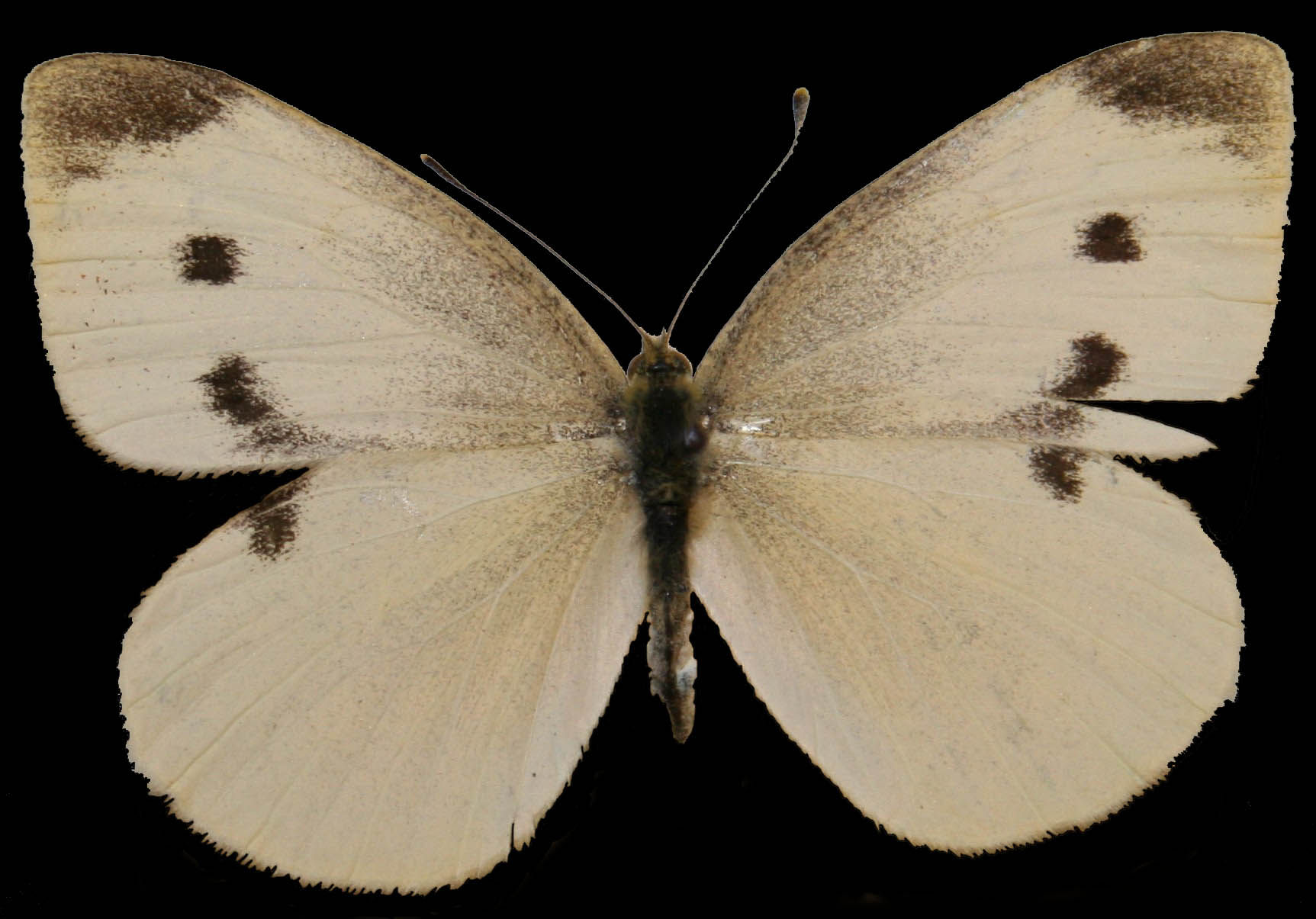
Female cabbage white, Pieris rapae

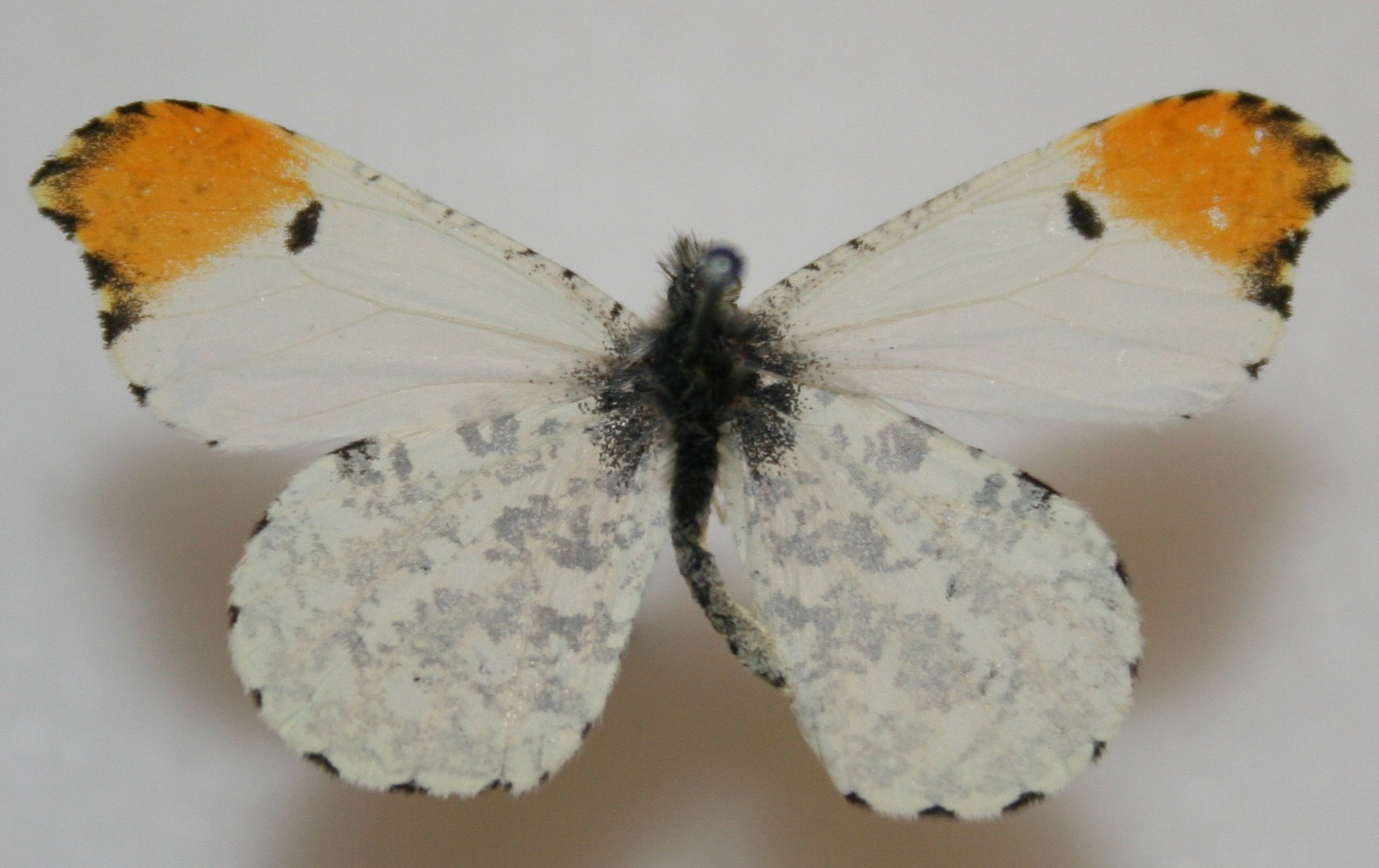
Male falcate orangetip, Anthocharis midea

- Pallid tilewhite, Hesperocharis costaricensis
- Mexican dartwhite, Catasticta nimbice
- Pine white, Neophasia menapia
- Chiricahua white, Neophasia terlootii
- Common green-eyed white, Leptophobia aripa
- Florida white, Appias drusilla
- Becker's white, Pontia beckerii
- Spring white, Pontia sisymbrii
- Checkered white, Pontia protodice
- Western white, Pontia occidentalis
- Mustard white, Pieris oleracea
- Margined white, Pieris marginalis
- Arctic white, Pieris angelika
- West Virginia white, Pieris virginiensis
- Cabbage white, Pieris rapae
- Great southern white, Ascia monuste
- Giant white, Ganyra josephina
- Howarth's white, Ganyra howarthi
- Painted white, Pieriballia viardi
- Common melwhite, Melete lycimnia
- Crossbarred white, Itaballia demophile
- Large marble, Euchloe ausonides
- Green marble, Euchloe naina
- Northern marble, Euchloe creusa
- Sonoran marble, Euchloe guaymasensis
- Pearly marble, Euchloe hyantis
  - California pearly marble, Euchloe hyantis hyantis
  - Desert pearly marble, Euchloe hyantis lotta
- Olympia marble, Euchloe olympia
- Desert orangetip, Anthocharis cethura
  - Pima orangetip, Anthocharis cethura pima
- Sara orangetip, Anthocharis sara
  - Pacific Sara orangetip, Anthocharis sara sara
  - Stella Sara orangetip, Anthocharis sara stella
- Falcate orangetip, Anthocharis midea
- Gray marble, Anthocharis lanceolata

== Subfamily Coliadinae: sulphurs ==
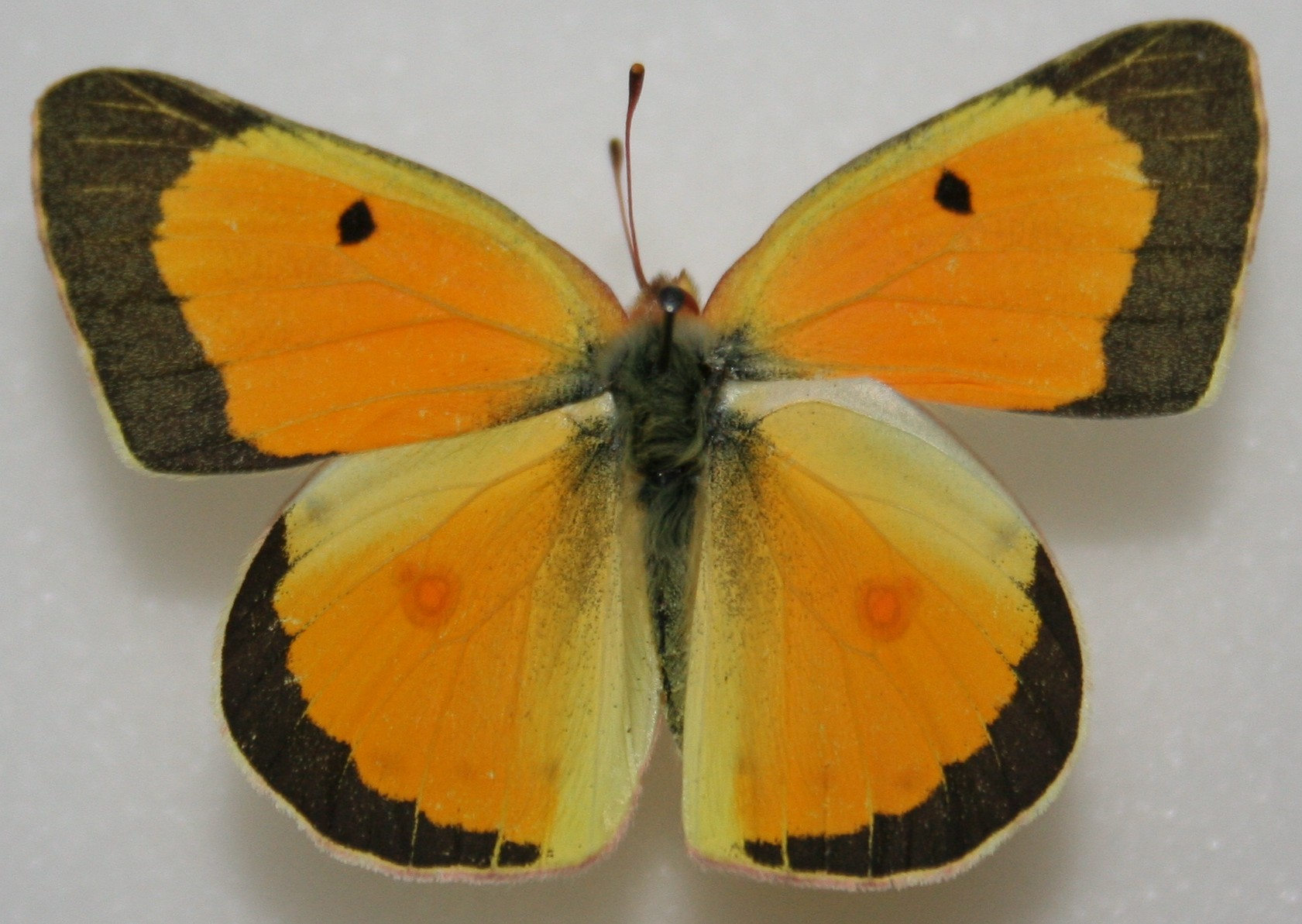
Male orange sulphur, Colias eurytheme

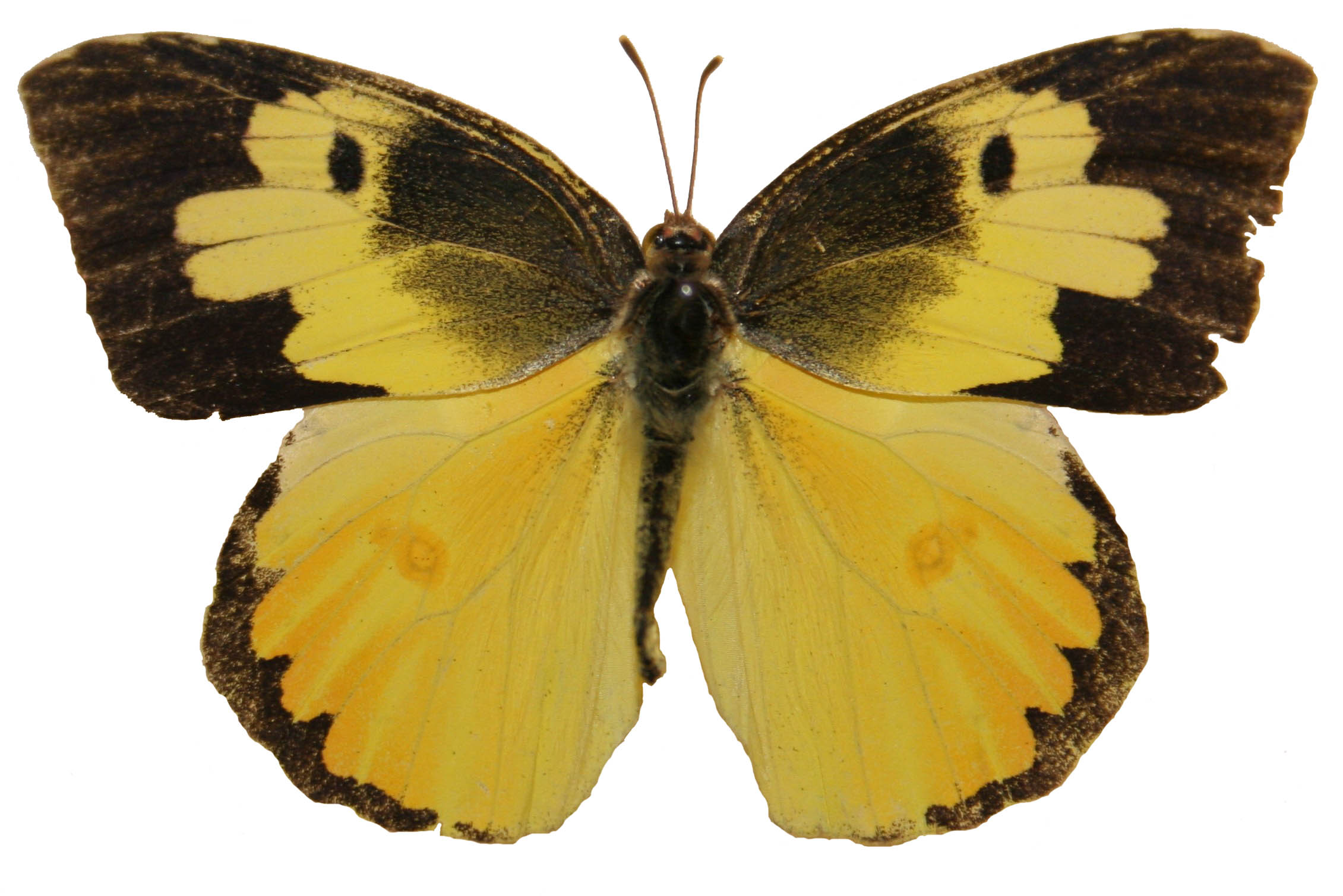
Male southern dogface, Zerene cesonia

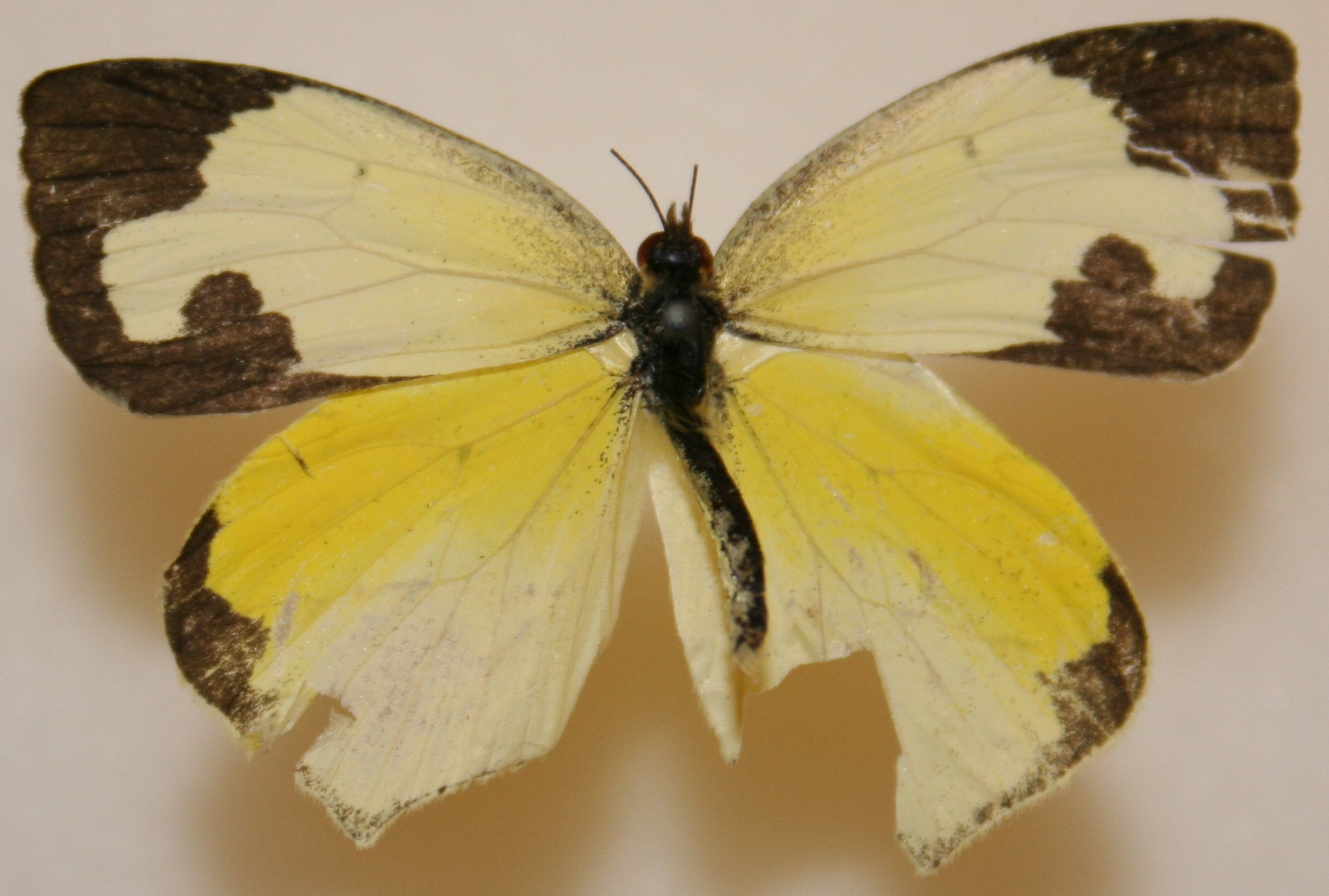
Mexican yellow, Eurema mexicana

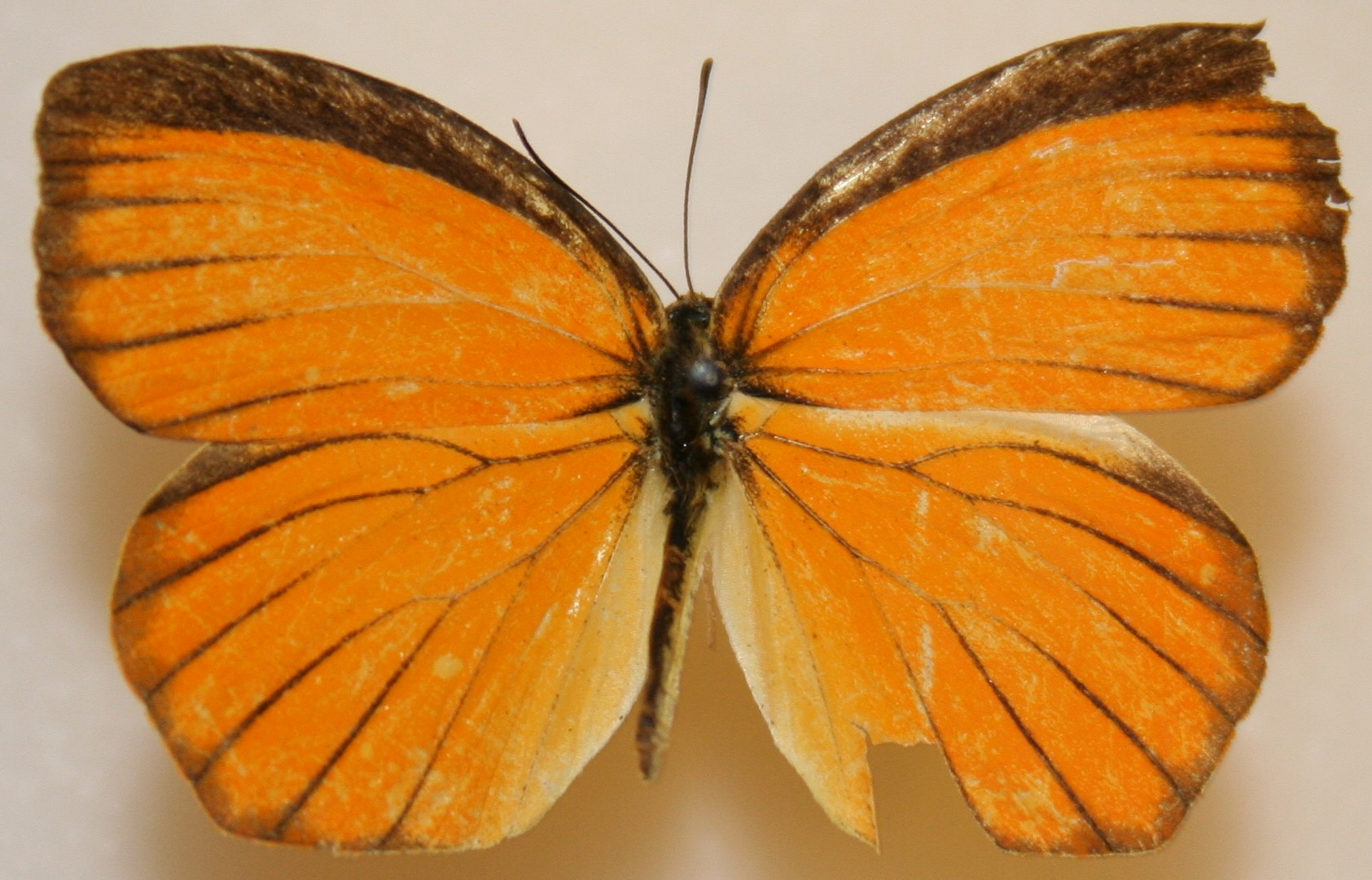
Tailed orange, Eurema proterpia

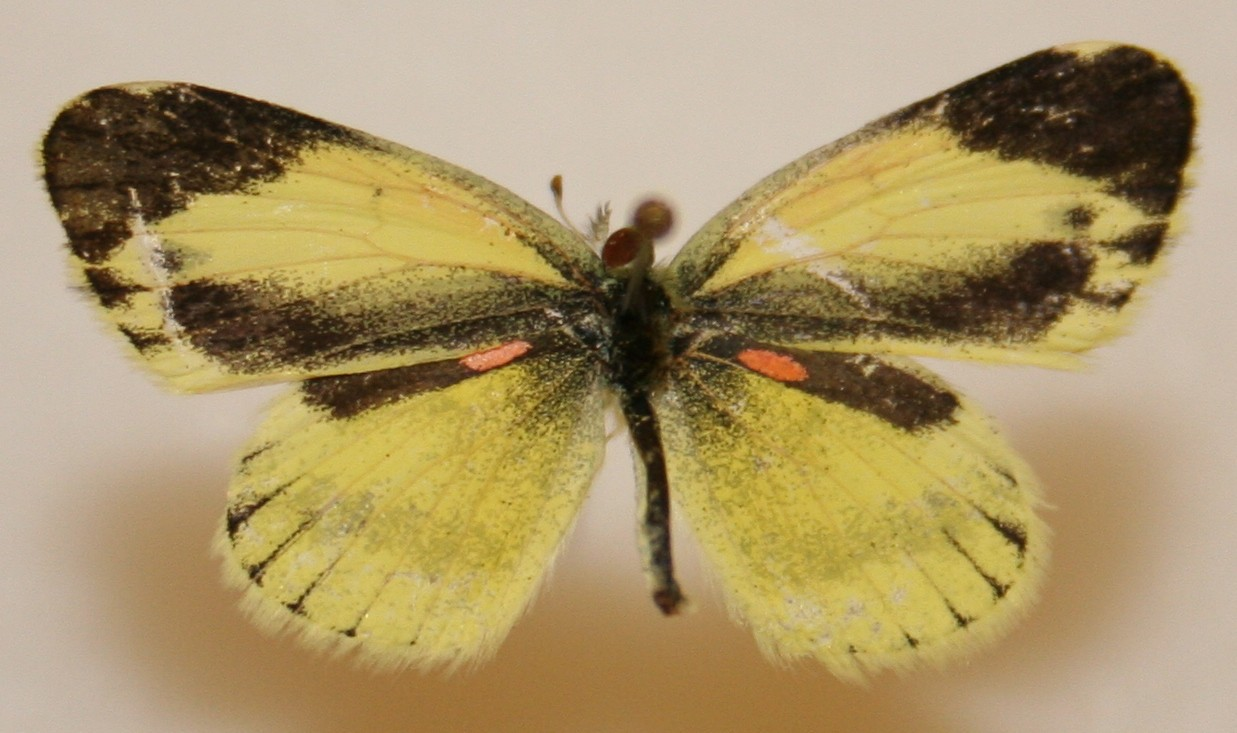
Dainty sulphur, Nathalis iole

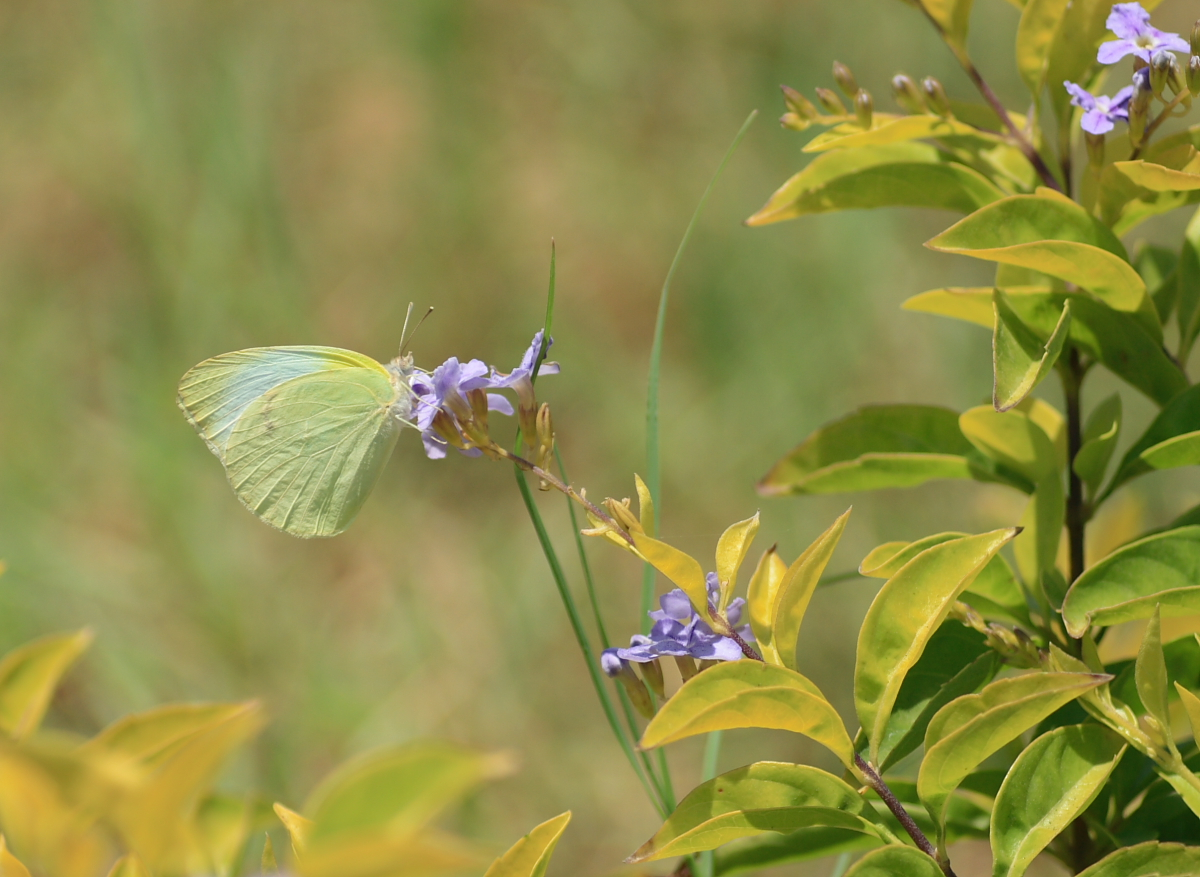
Lyside sulphur, Kricogonia lyside

- Statira sulphur, Aphrissa statira
- Clouded sulphur, Colias philodice
- Orange sulphur, Colias eurytheme
- Western sulphur, Colias occidentalis
  - Colias occidentalis chrysomelas
  - Colias occidentalis pseudochristina
- Christina's sulphur, Colias christina
- Queen Alexandra's sulphur, Colias alexandra
  - Harford's Queen Alexandra's sulphur, Colias alexandra harfordii
  - Colias alexandra krauthii
- Mead's sulphur, Colias meadii
- Coppermine sulphur, Colias johanseni
- Canadian sulphur, Colias canadensis
- Hecla sulphur, Colias hecla
- Booth's sulphur, Colias tyche
- Labrador sulphur, Colias nastes
  - Colias nastes thula
- Scudder's sulphur, Colias scudderi
- Giant sulphur, Colias gigantea
- Sierra sulphur, Colias behrii
- Pelidne sulphur, Colias pelidne
- Pink-edged sulphur, Colias interior
- Palaeno sulphur, Colias palaeno
- California dogface, Zerene eurydice
- Southern dogface, Zerene cesonia
- White angled-sulphur, Anteos clorinde
- Yellow angled-sulphur, Anteos maerula
- Cloudless sulphur, Phoebis sennae
- Orange-barred sulphur, Phoebis philea
- Large orange sulphur, Phoebis agarithe
- Tailed sulphur, Phoebis neocypris
- Orbed sulphur, Phoebis orbis
- Lyside sulphur, Kricogonia lyside
- Barred yellow, Eurema daira
- Ghost yellow, Eurema albula
- Boisduval's yellow, Eurema boisduvaliana
- Mexican yellow, Eurema mexicana
- Salome yellow, Eurema salome
- Tailed orange, Eurema proterpia
- Little yellow, Eurema lisa
- Mimosa yellow, Eurema nise
- Shy yellow, Eurema messalina
- Dina yellow, Eurema dina
- Sleepy orange, Eurema nicippe
- Dainty sulphur, Nathalis iole

== Subfamily Dismorphiinae: mimic-whites ==
- Costa-spotted mimic-white, Enantia albania
