= List of butterflies of North America =

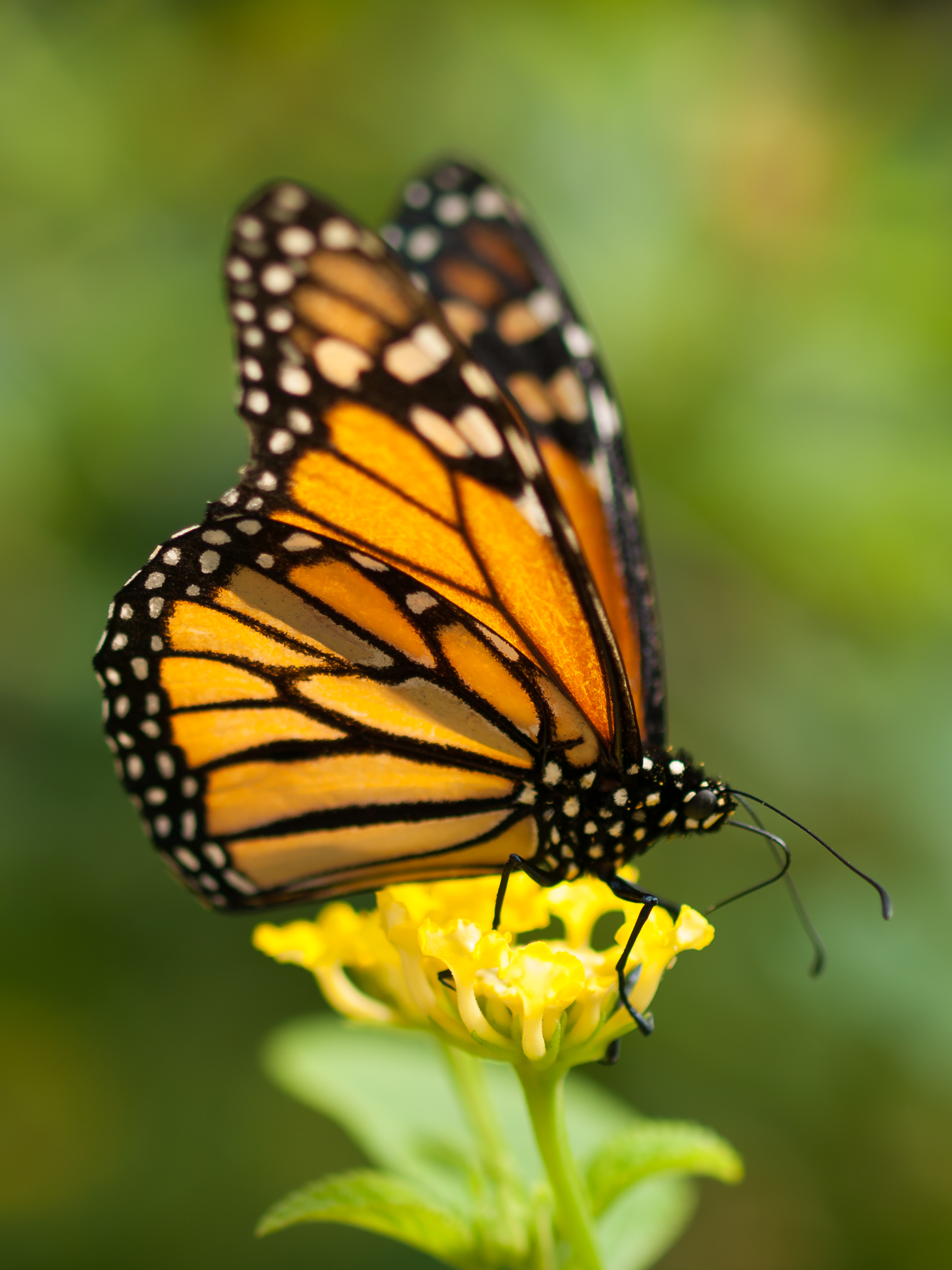
Monarch butterfly

This list contains links to lists with the common and scientific names of butterflies of North America north of Mexico.

- Papilionidae: swallowtails and parnassians (40 species)
  - Parnassiinae: parnassians (3 species)
  - Papilioninae: swallowtails (37 species)
- Hesperiidae: skippers (300 species)
  - Pyrrhopyginae: firetips (1 species)
  - Pyrginae: spread-wing skippers (138 species)
  - Heteropterinae: skipperlings (7 species)
  - Hesperiinae: grass skippers (141 species)
  - Megathyminae: giant-skippers (13 species)
- Pieridae: whites and sulphurs (70 species)
  - Pierinae: whites (29 species)
  - Coliadinae: sulphurs (40 species)
  - Dismorphiinae: mimic-whites (1 species)
- Lycaenidae: gossamer-wings (144 species)
  - Miletinae: harvesters (1 species)
  - Lycaeninae: coppers (16 species)
  - Theclinae: hairstreaks (90 species)
  - Polyommatinae: blues (37 species)
- Riodinidae: metalmarks (28 species)
- Nymphalidae: brush-footed butterflies (233 species)
  - Libytheinae: snouts (1 species)
  - Heliconiinae: heliconians and fritillaries (40 species)
  - Nymphalinae: true brushfoots (76 species)
  - Limenitidinae: admirals, sisters and others (37 species)
  - Charaxinae: leafwings (8 species)
  - Apaturinae: emperors (5 species)
  - Morphinae: morphos (3 species)
  - Satyrinae: satyrs (49 species)
  - Danainae: milkweed butterflies and clearwings (8 species)
