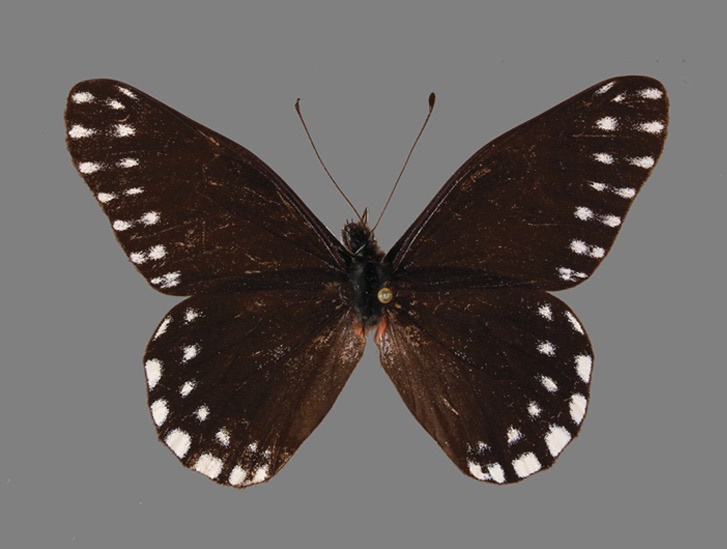

Scientific classification
- Kingdom: Animalia
- Phylum: Arthropoda
- Class: Insecta
- Order: Lepidoptera
- Family: Pieridae
- Genus: Catasticta
- Species: C. sibyllae

Binomial name
- Catasticta sibyllae Nakahara, Padrón & MacDonald, 2018

= Catasticta sibyllae =

Species of butterfly

Catasticta sibyllae is a butterfly in the family Pieridae. It is only known from two sites in western Panama and is represented by a single male specimen from each site. It was first described by Shinichi Nakahara, Pablo Sebastián Padrón, and John R. MacDonald in 2018. The first specimen was caught in the 1980s and stowed in a drawer in the National Museum of Natural History.

Its wings are black with two rows of cream-colored spots near the edges. It differs from other Catasticta species in the lack of markings on the medial surfaces of its black forewings and hindwings. According to DNA analysis, it is most closely related to Catasticta lisa Baumann & Reissinger, 1969, which has a broad white band on the upper surfaces of the wings. The two specimens of C. sibyllae had forewing lengths of 30 and 33 mm (1.2 and 1.3 in) respectively.

The name honors Maria Sibylla Merian, a 17th-century European naturalist and entomologist who studied butterflies in South America.
