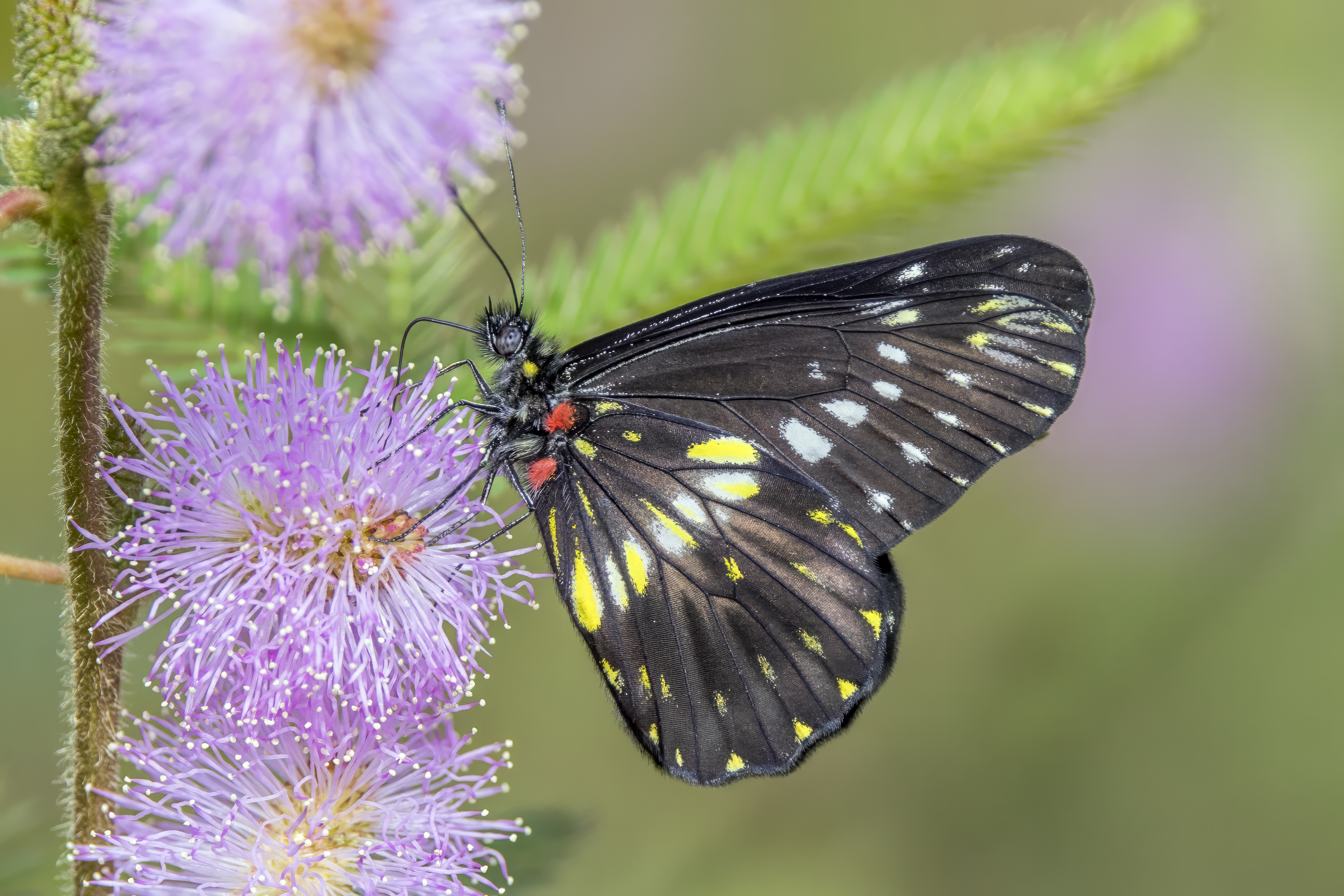
- C. flisa postaurea, Colombia

Scientific classification
- Kingdom: Animalia
- Phylum: Arthropoda
- Clade: Pancrustacea
- Class: Insecta
- Order: Lepidoptera
- Family: Pieridae
- Tribe: Pierini
- Genus: Catasticta; Butler, 1870

Synonyms
- Archonoia Reissinger, 1972; Pierinoia Reissinger, 1972; Leodontoia Reissinger, 1972; Hesperochoia Reissinger, 1972

= Catasticta =

Genus of butterflies

Catasticta is a genus of Neotropical butterflies in the family Pieridae. The genus was erected by Arthur Gardiner Butler in 1870.

== Species ==
- Subgenus Catasticta Butler, 1870
  - The flisa species group
    - Catasticta bithys (Hübner, 1831)
    - Catasticta flisa (Herrich-Schäffer, 1858)
    - Catasticta huebneri Lathy & Rosenberg, 1912
    - Catasticta nimbice (Boisduval, 1836)
    - Catasticta theresa Butler & H. Druce, 1874
  - The sisamnus species group
    - Catasticta hegemon Godman & Salvin, 1889
    - Catasticta lisa Baumann & Reissinger, 1969
    - Catasticta prioneris (Hopffer, 1874)
    - Catasticta sibyllae Nakahara, Padrón & MacDonald, 2018
    - Catasticta sisamnus (Fabricius, 1793)
  - The notha species group
    - Catasticta corcyra (C. Felder & R. Felder, 1859)
    - Catasticta eurigania (Hewitson, 1870)
    - Catasticta notha (Doubleday, 1847)
    - Catasticta pieris (Hopffer, 1874)
- Subgenus Archonoia Reissinger, 1972
  - The ctemene species group
    - Catasticta ctemene (Hewitson, 1869)
    - Catasticta hebra (Lucas, 1852)
  - The teutamis species group
    - Catasticta pharnakia (Fruhstorfer, 1907)
    - Catasticta teutamis (Hewitson, 1860)
  - The grisea species group
    - Catasticta grisea Joicey & Rosenberg, 1915
    - Catasticta huancabambensis Joicey & Rosenberg, 1915
    - Catasticta pluvius Tessmann, 1928
    - Catasticta potameoides Reissinger, 1972
    - Catasticta sella Eitschberger & Racheli, 1998
  - The colla species group
    - Catasticta chelidonis (Hopffer, 1874)
    - Catasticta colla (Doubleday, 1847)
    - Catasticta ludovici Eitschberger & Racheli, 1998
- Subgenus Catasticta
  - The susiana species group
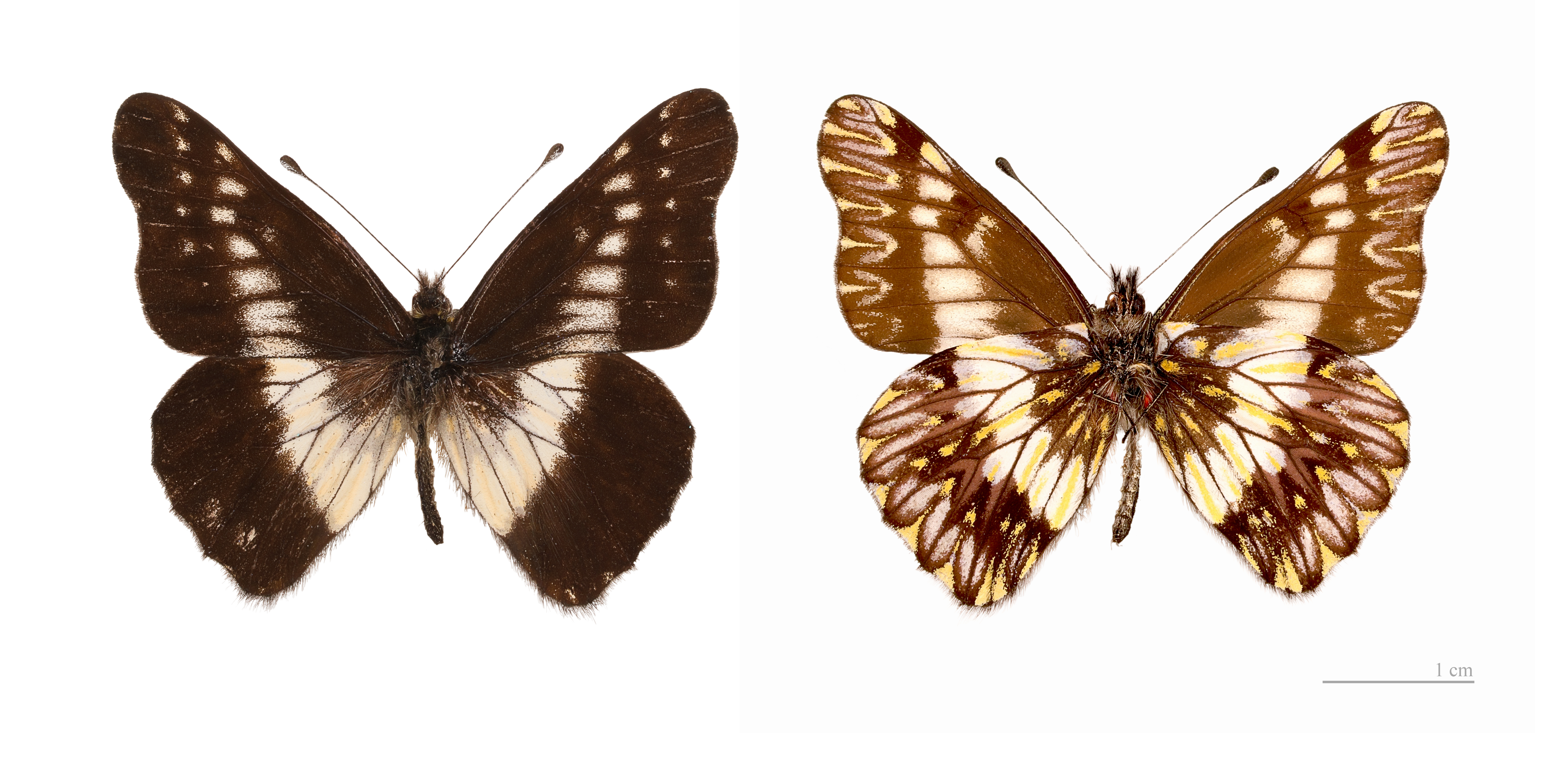
    Catasticta susiana
    - Catasticta collina F. Brown, 1939
    - Catasticta sinapina Butler, 1896
    - Catasticta pillcopata (Bollino, 2008)
    - Catasticta radiata (Kollar, 1850)
    - Catasticta reducta Butler, 1896
    - Catasticta susiana (Hopffer, 1874)
    - Catasticta scaeva Röber, 1909
  - The philone species group
    - Catasticta anaitis (Hewitson, 1869)
    - Catasticta discalba F. Brown & Gabriel, 1939
    - Catasticta distincta Lathy & Rosenberg, 1912
    - Catasticta frontina F. Brown & Gabriel, 1939
    - Catasticta leucophaea Lathy & Rosenberg, 1912
    - Catasticta nimbata Joicey & Talbot, 1918
    - Catasticta philone (C. Felder & R. Felder, 1865)
    - Catasticta pyrczi Bollino, 2008
    - Catasticta smithia F. Brown & Gabriel, 1939
    - Catasticta suadela (Hopffer, 1874)
    - Catasticta suasa Röber, 1908
  - The aureomaculata species group
    - Catasticta aureomaculata Lathy & Rosenberg, 1912
    - Catasticta ferra F. Brown & Gabriel, 1939
    - Catasticta modesta (Lucas, 1852)
    - Catasticta philais (C. Felder & R. Felder, 1865)
    - Catasticta philothea (C. Felder & R. Felder, 1865)
    - Catasticta rileya F. Brown & Gabriel, 1939
    - Catasticta tamsa F. Brown & Gabriel, 1939
  - The manco species group
    - Catasticta fulva Joicey & Rosenberg, 1915
    - Catasticta incerta (Dognin, 1888)
    - Catasticta lanceolata Lathy & Rosenberg, 1912
    - Catasticta lycurgus Godman & Salvin, 1880
    - Catasticta manco (Doubleday, 1848)
    - Catasticta philoscia (C. Felder & R. Felder, 1861)
    - Catasticta pinava (Doubleday, 1847)
    - Catasticta scurra Röber, 1924
  - The troezene species group
    - Catasticta affinis Röber, 1909
    - Catasticta gelba F. Brown & Gabriel, 1939
    - Catasticta giga F. Brown & Gabriel, 1939
    - Catasticta philodora F. Brown, 1939
    - Catasticta seitzi Lathy & Rosenberg, 1912
    - Catasticta troezene (C. Felder & R. Felder, 1865)
    - Catasticta watkinsi Lathy & Rosenberg, 1912
- Subgenus Hesperochoia Reissinger, 1972
  - The poujadei species group
    - Catasticta eximia Röber, 1909
    - Catasticta poujadei (Dognin, 1887)
    - Catasticta revancha Rey & Pyrcz, 1996
  - The chrysolopha species group
    - Catasticta atahuallpa (Eitschberger & Racheli, 1998)
    - Catasticta chrysolopha (Kollar, 1850)
    - Catasticta cora (Lucas, 1852)
    - Catasticta similis Lathy & Rosenberg, 1912
    - Catasticta superba Lathy & Rosenberg, 1912
    - Catasticta truncata Lathy & Rosenberg, 1912
  - The toca species group
    - Catasticta apaturina Butler, 1901
    - Catasticta tamina Röber, 1909
    - Catasticta thomasorum Jasinski, 1998
    - Catasticta toca (Doubleday, 1847)
    - Catasticta tomyris (C. Felder & R. Felder, 1865)
  - The teutila species group
    - Catasticta duida F. Brown, 1932
    - Catasticta teutila (Doubleday, 1847)
- Subgenus Leodontoia Reissinger, 1972
  - The cerberus species group
    - Catasticta cerberus Godman & Salvin, 1889
  - The amastris species group
    - Catasticta abiseo Lamas & Bollino, 2004
    - Catasticta amastris (Hewitson, 1874)
    - Catasticta marcapita Röber, 1909
    - Catasticta paucartambo (Eitschberger & Racheli, 1998)
    - Catasticta semiramis (Lucas, 1852)
    - Catasticta socorrensis Fassl, 1915
    - Catasticta striata (Eitschberger & Racheli, 1998)
    - Catasticta vilcabamba Lamas & Bollino, 2004
  - The cinerea species group
    - Catasticta cinerea Butler, 1897
    - Catasticta coerulescens Eitschberger & Racheli, 1998
    - Catasticta rochereaui Le Cerf, 1924
  - The albofasciata species group
    - Catasticta albofasciata Lathy & Rosenberg, 1912
    - Catasticta tricolor Butler, 1897
    - Catasticta uricoecheae (C. Felder & R. Felder, 1861)
    - Catasticta vulnerata Butler, 1897
  - The rosea species group
    - Catasticta arborardens Reissinger, 1972
    - Catasticta rosea Joicey & Rosenberg, 1915
