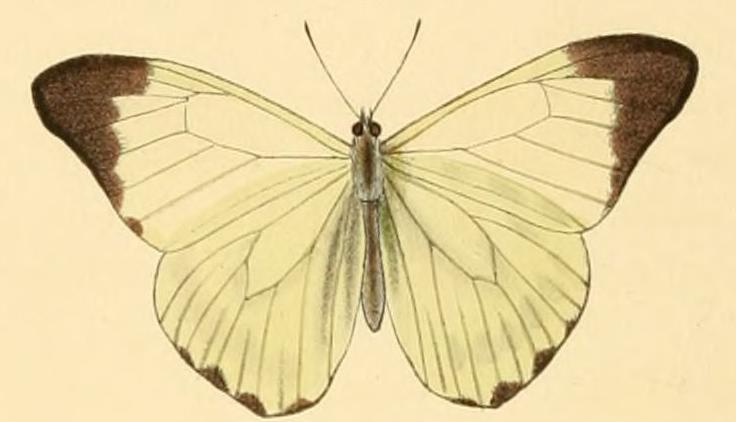

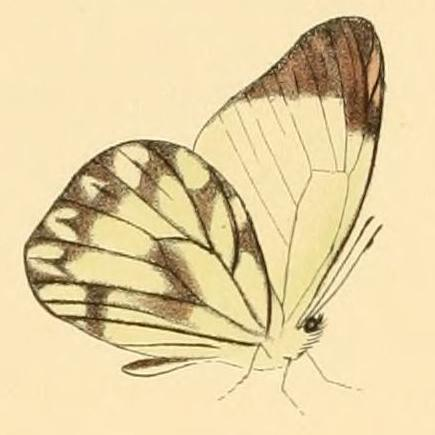

Scientific classification
- Kingdom: Animalia
- Phylum: Arthropoda
- Class: Insecta
- Order: Lepidoptera
- Family: Pieridae
- Genus: Hesperocharis
- Species: H. nera

Binomial name
- Hesperocharis nera (Hewitson, 1852)

Synonyms
- Pieris nera Hewitson, 1852; Hesperocharis nera nera f. flaveola Fruhstorfer, 1908; Hesperocharis nereis C. & R. Felder, 1865; Hesperocharis nera nilios Fruhstorfer, 1907; Hesperocharis nera nilios f. aphaia Fruhstorfer, 1908; Hesperocharis nera var. piratapuya Zikán, 1940; Hesperocharis nera potara Kaye, 1920; Hesperocharis nera amazonica Fruhstorfer, 1907; Hesperocharis nera f. flavescens Röber, 1909; Hesperocharis nera aida Fruhstorfer, 1908; Hesperocharis nera aida f. minia Fruhstorfer, 1908; Hesperocharis nera nirvana Fruhstorfer, 1908; Hesperocharis nera nirvana f. vitha Fruhstorfer, 1908; Hesperocharis nera f. boliviana Röber, 1909; Hesperocharis lamonti Kaye, 1920

= Hesperocharis nera =

Species of butterfly

Hesperocharis nera, the Nera white, is a butterfly of the family Pieridae. It is found in Trinidad, Ecuador, Peru, Colombia, Suriname, the Guianas, Brazil and Bolivia.

== Subspecies ==
- H. n. nera (Ecuador)
- H. n. aida Fruhstorfer, 1908 (Peru, Bolivia)
- H. n. amazonica Fruhstorfer, 1907 (Peru, Ecuador)
- H. n. lamonti Kaye, 1920 (Trinidad)
- H. n. nereis C. & R. Felder, 1865 (Colombia)
- H. n. nerida Zikán, 1940 (Brazil: Amazonas)
- H. n. nymphaea Möschler, 1876 (Surinam, Guyana, Brazil: Amazonas)
