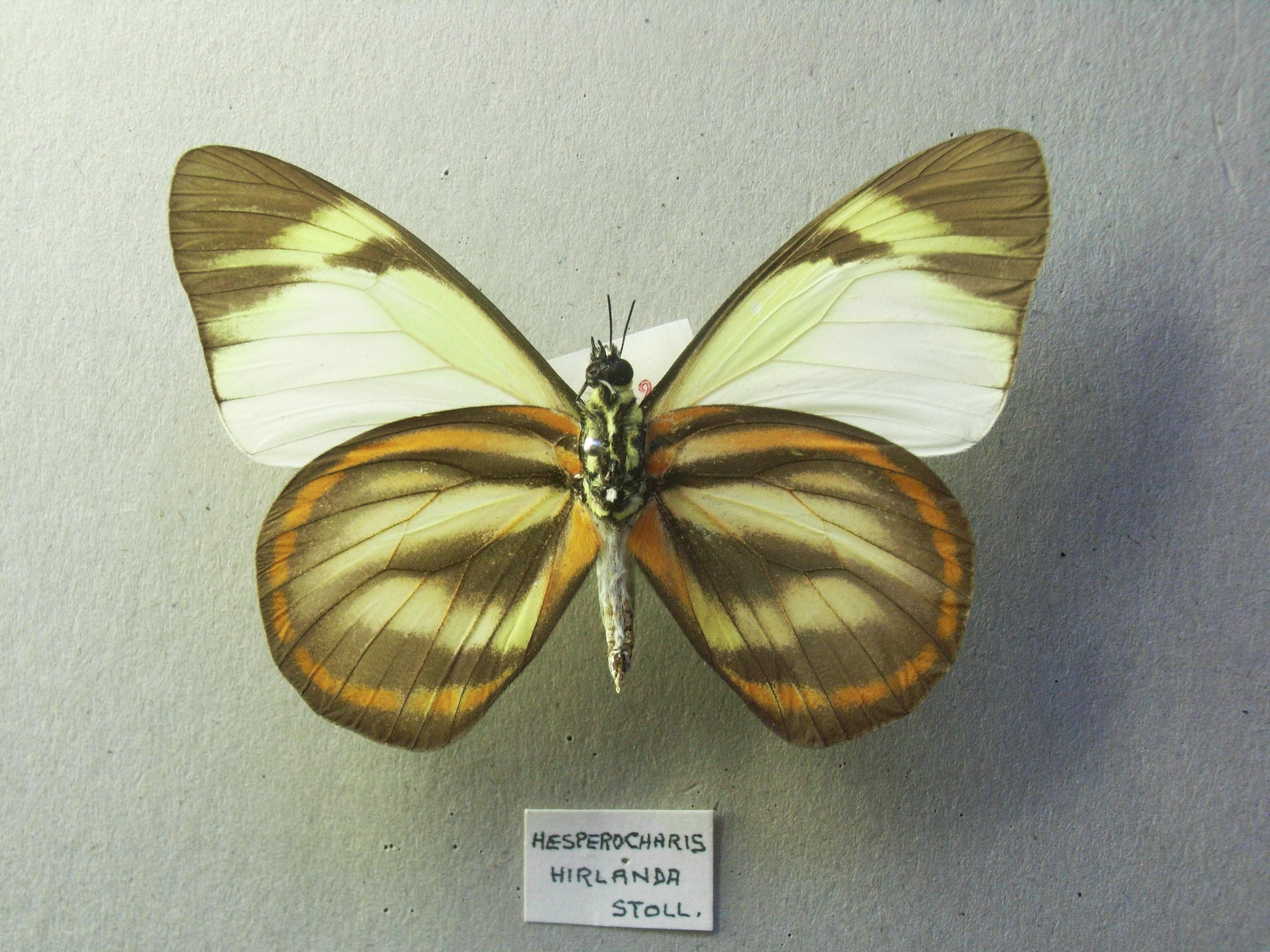
- Hesperocharis hirlanda

Scientific classification
- Kingdom: Animalia
- Phylum: Arthropoda
- Class: Insecta
- Order: Lepidoptera
- Family: Pieridae
- Tribe: Anthocharini
- Genus: Hesperocharis; C. Felder, 1862

Synonyms
- Heliochroma Butler, 1869; Cunizza Grote, 1900

= Hesperocharis =

Butterfly genus in family Pieridae

Hesperocharis is a genus of butterflies in the family Pieridae. They are native to the Americas.

== Species ==
- Hesperocharis anguitia (Godart, 1819)
- Hesperocharis costaricensis H. W. Bates, 1866 – Costa Rican white
- Hesperocharis crocea H. W. Bates, 1866 – orange white
- Hesperocharis emeris (Boisduval, 1836) – emeris White
- Hesperocharis erota (Lucas, 1852)
- Hesperocharis graphites H. W. Bates, 1864 – marbled white
- Hesperocharis hirlanda (Stoll, [1790])
- Hesperocharis leucania (Boisduval, 1836)
- Hesperocharis marchalii (Guérin-Méneville, [1844]) – Marchal's white
- Hesperocharis ñambii Salazar & Constantino, 2007
- Hesperocharis nera (Hewitson, 1852) – Nera white
- Hesperocharis nereina Hopffer, 1874 – nereina white
- Hesperocharis paranensis Schaus, 1898
