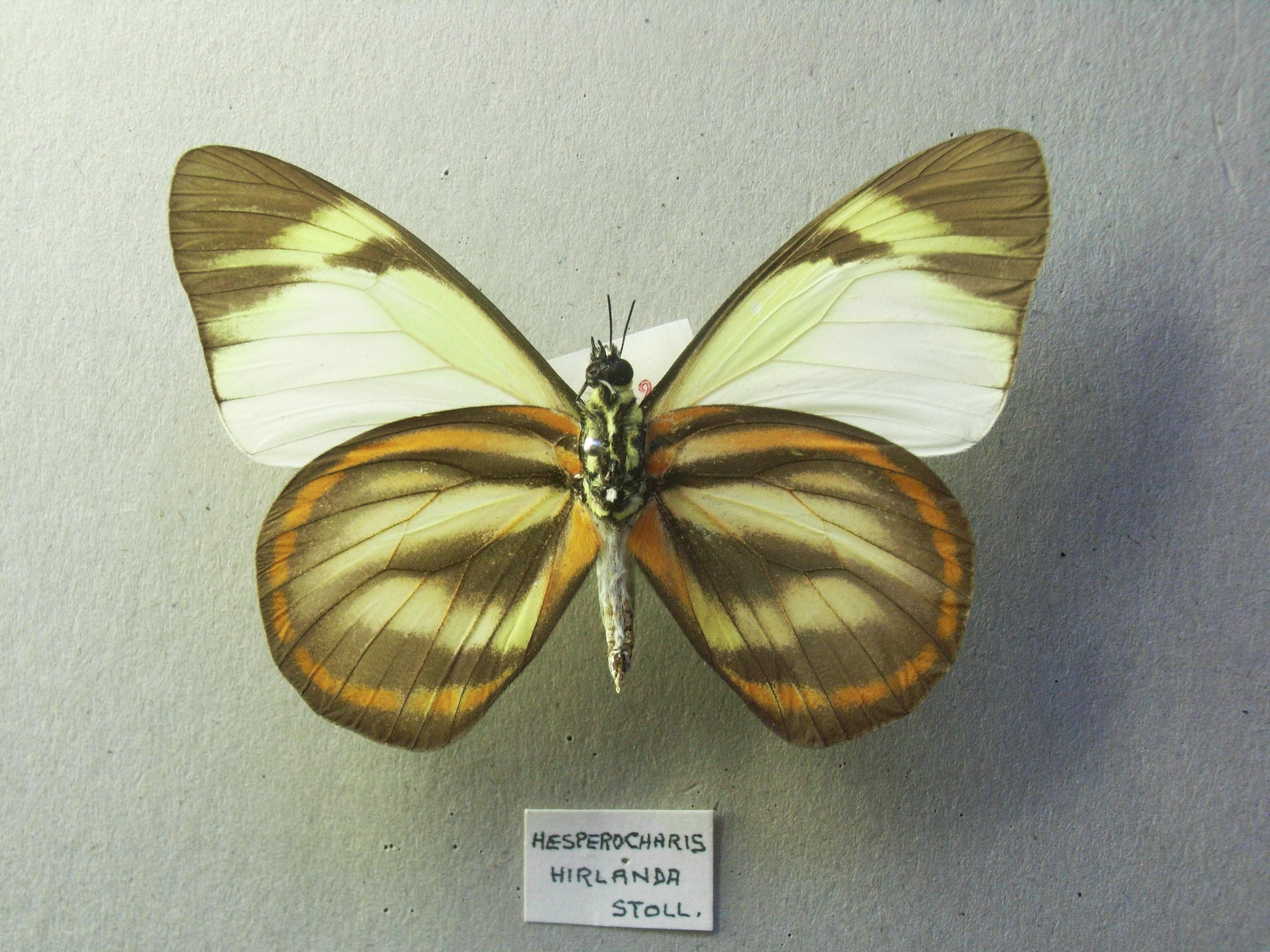

Scientific classification
- Kingdom: Animalia
- Phylum: Arthropoda
- Class: Insecta
- Order: Lepidoptera
- Family: Pieridae
- Genus: Hesperocharis
- Species: H. hirlanda

Binomial name
- Hesperocharis hirlanda (Stoll, [1790])

Synonyms
- Papilio hirlanda Stoll, [1790]; Cunizza hirlanda; Cathaemia hirlanda; Hesperocharis fulvinota Butler, 1871; Cunizza hirlanda posidonia Fruhstorfer, 1910; Hesperocharis hirlanda obnubila Fruhstorfer, 1907

= Hesperocharis hirlanda =

Species of butterfly

Hesperocharis hirlanda, the Hirlanda white, is a butterfly in the family Pieridae. It is found in Colombia, Venezuela, Ecuador, Peru, Brazil and Bolivia. The habitat consists of forested foothills in the eastern Andes and lowlands in the upper Amazon basin. It is found at altitudes between about 400 and 1,000 meters.

Adults feed on mineralised moisture.

== Subspecies ==
The following subspecies are recognised:

- H. h. hirlanda (Brazil: Amazonas)
- H. h. helvia (Latreille, [1813]) (Mexico)
- H. h. fulvinota Butler, 1871 (Brazil: Rio de Janeiro)
- H. h. apicalis Fruhstorfer, 1907 (Ecuador, Colombia)
- H. h. niaguida Fruhstorfer, 1907 (Peru)
- H. h. praeclara Fruhstorfer, 1907 (Brazil: Espírito Santo)
- H. h. serda Fruhstorfer, 1907 (Colombia)
- H. h. minturna (Fruhstorfer, 1910) (Venezuela)
- H. h. planasia (Fruhstorfer, 1910) (Brazil: Mato Grosso)
