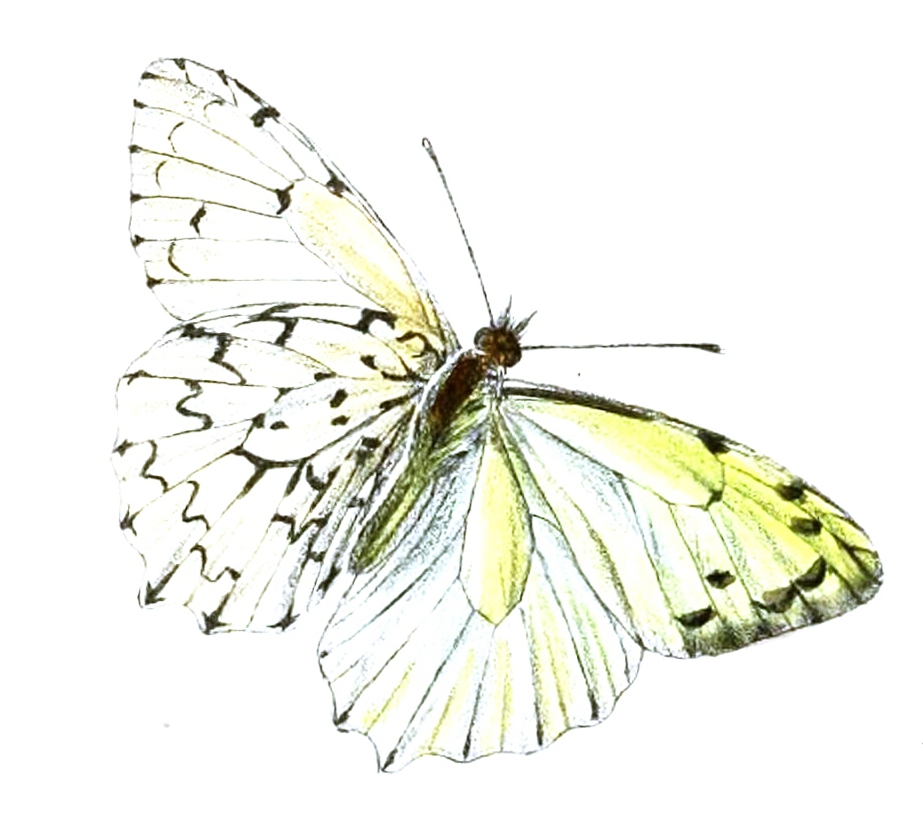

Scientific classification
- Kingdom: Animalia
- Phylum: Arthropoda
- Clade: Pancrustacea
- Class: Insecta
- Order: Lepidoptera
- Family: Pieridae
- Genus: Hesperocharis
- Species: H. graphites

Binomial name
- Hesperocharis graphites H. W. Bates, 1864

Synonyms
- Pieris avivolans Butler, 1865; Papilio xiutzaltzin Arias, 1968 (nom. nud.); Papilio xiutlatzin Arias, 1968 (nom. nud.)

= Hesperocharis graphites =

Species of butterfly

Hesperocharis graphites, the marbled white or Mexican marbled white, is a butterfly in the family Pieridae. It is found in Mexico, Guatemala and Nicaragua. It is found in montane habitats, including cloud forests, open pastures and páramo grassland.

== Subspecies ==
The following subspecies are recognised:

- Hesperocharis graphites graphites (Guatemala)
- Hesperocharis graphites avivolans (Butler, 1865) (Mexico)
