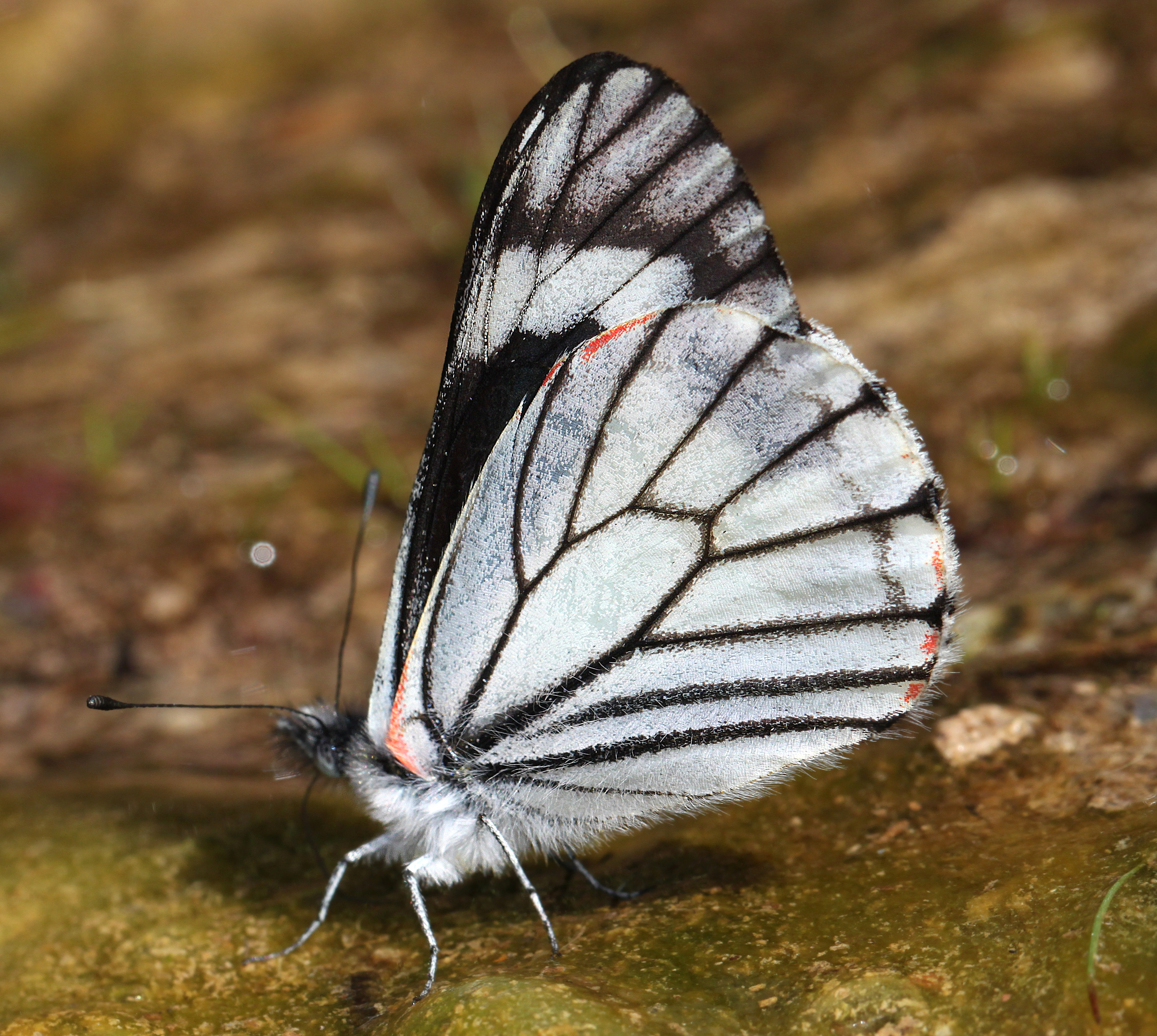
- Neophasia terlooii

Scientific classification
- Kingdom: Animalia
- Phylum: Arthropoda
- Class: Insecta
- Order: Lepidoptera
- Family: Pieridae
- Tribe: Pierini
- Genus: Neophasia; Behr, 1869

= Neophasia =

Butterfly genus in family Pieridae

Neophasia is a genus of pierid butterflies found in North America.

== Species ==
- Neophasia menapia (Felder, C & R Felder, 1859)
- Neophasia terlooii Behr, 1869
