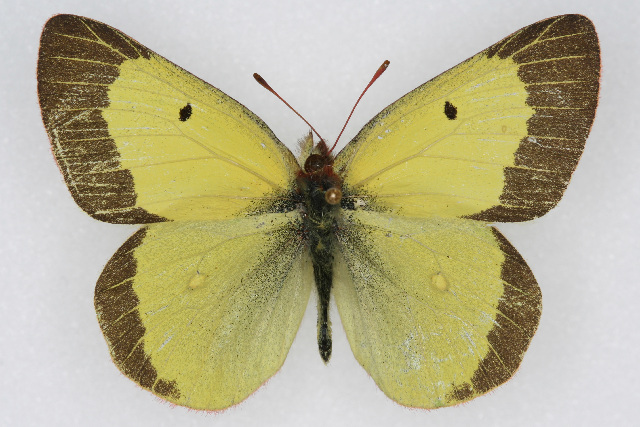

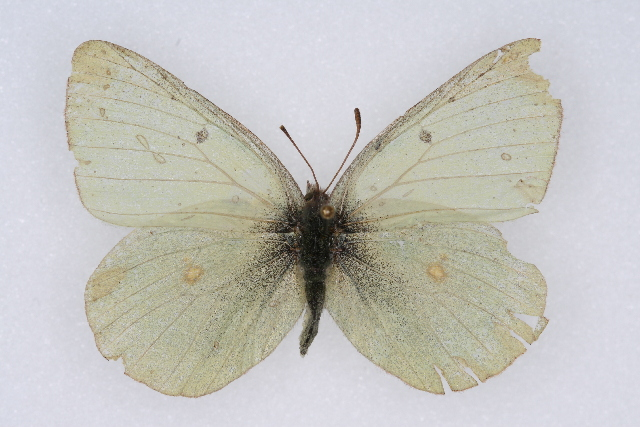

Conservation status
- Apparently Secure (NatureServe)

Scientific classification
- Kingdom: Animalia
- Phylum: Arthropoda
- Clade: Pancrustacea
- Class: Insecta
- Order: Lepidoptera
- Family: Pieridae
- Genus: Colias
- Species: C. scudderii

Binomial name
- Colias scudderii Reakirt, 1865

Synonyms
- Colias scudderi; Eurymus scudderi; Colias flavotincta Cockerell, 1901

= Colias scudderii =

Species of butterfly

Colias scudderii, the willow sulphur, is a butterfly in the family Pieridae. It is found from Alaska south through the Rocky Mountains to northern New Mexico. The habitat consists of mountain meadows and willow bogs.

The wingspan is 38–51 mm (1.5–2.0 in). Adults are on wing from June to August. They feed on flower nectar.

The larvae feed on the leaves of Salix species (including Salix reticulata, Salix lutea and Salix planifolia). Second, third, and fourth instar larvae hibernate.

== Subspecies ==
- Colias scudderii scudderii (Colorado, Utah, New Mexico, Wyoming)
- Colias scudderii ruckesi Klots, 1937 (New Mexico)
