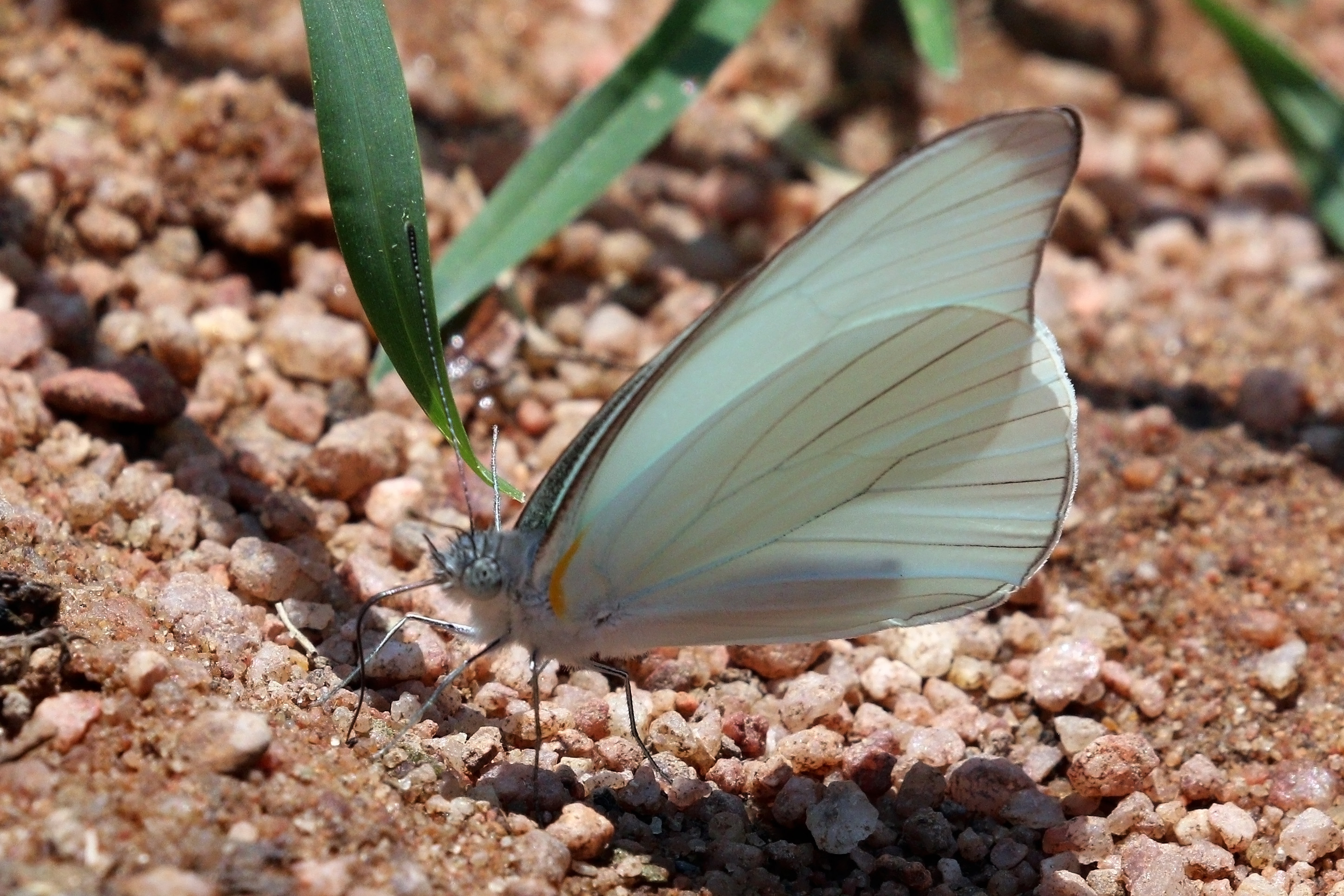
- Ganyra phaloe Crsitalino River, Southern Amazon, Brazil

Scientific classification
- Kingdom: Animalia
- Phylum: Arthropoda
- Clade: Pancrustacea
- Class: Insecta
- Order: Lepidoptera
- Family: Pieridae
- Tribe: Pierini
- Genus: Ganyra; Billberg, 1820

Species
- See text.

= Ganyra =

Butterfly genus in family Pieridae

Ganyra is a Neotropical genus of butterflies in the family Pieridae.

== Species ==
- Ganyra howarthi (Dixey, 1915)
- Ganyra josephina (Godart, 1819)
- Ganyra phaloe (Godart, 1819)
