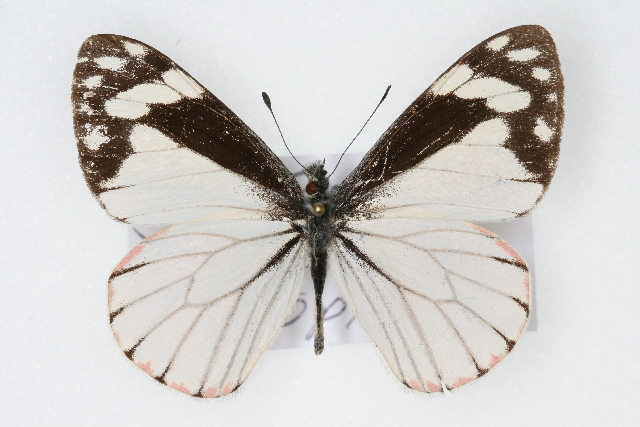

Conservation status
- Apparently Secure (NatureServe)

Scientific classification
- Kingdom: Animalia
- Phylum: Arthropoda
- Clade: Pancrustacea
- Class: Insecta
- Order: Lepidoptera
- Family: Pieridae
- Genus: Neophasia
- Species: N. terlooii

Binomial name
- Neophasia terlooii Behr, 1869

Synonyms
- Leptalis terlooii; Neophasia terlootii Behr, 1889; Neophasia epyaxa Strecker, 1900; Archonias princetonia Strecker, 1900 (nom. nud.); Neophasia terlootii var. princetionia Poling, 1900

= Neophasia terlooii =

Species of butterfly

Neophasia terlooii, the Chiricahua white, Chiricahua pine white, or Mexican pine white is a butterfly in the family Pieridae. It is found in New Mexico, in the high mountains of Arizona, and south into Mexico. Its habitat consists of forests of needled conifers of the family Pinaceae. Its current conservation status is G4.

== Description ==
The males are white while the females are orange. On both, the upperside of the forewing has black cells and a costal margin. The tip of the wing is black with white spots. The wingspan is 45–58 mm (1.8–2.3 in). Males resemble Neophasia menapia.
