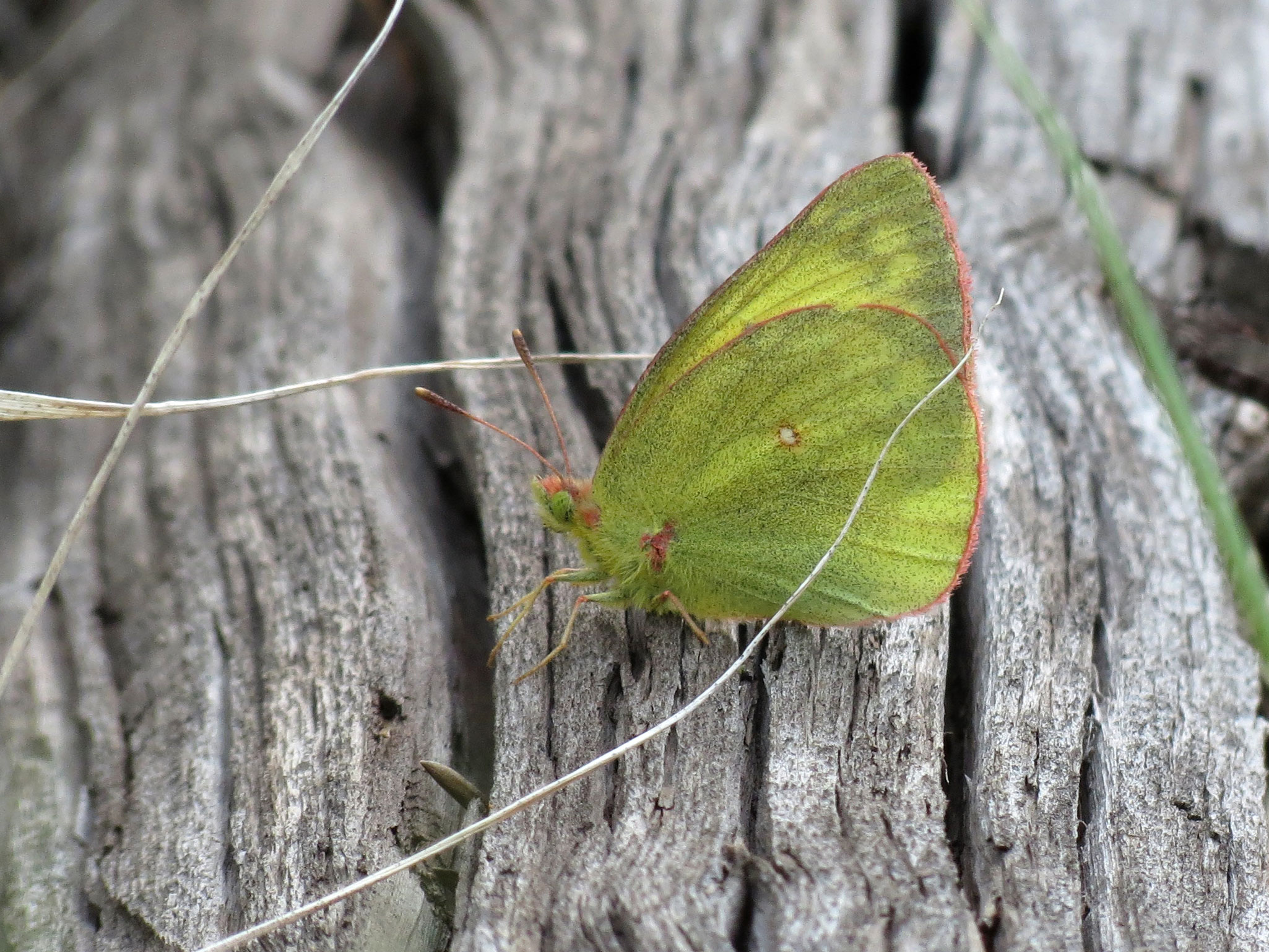

Conservation status
- Secure (NatureServe)

Scientific classification
- Kingdom: Animalia
- Phylum: Arthropoda
- Clade: Pancrustacea
- Class: Insecta
- Order: Lepidoptera
- Family: Pieridae
- Genus: Colias
- Species: C. christina

Binomial name
- Colias christina W.H. Edwards, 1863

Synonyms
- Eurymus christina Lyman, 1884

= Colias christina =

Species of butterfly

Colias christina, the Christina sulphur, is a butterfly in the family Pieridae found in western North America. Its range includes the Yukon and Northwest Territories south through British Columbia, Alberta, and Saskatchewan to Wyoming, Montana, and Utah. This species was named in honor of its first collector Christina Ross.

== Description ==
Colias christina has slight orange-red ground colour and is conspicuous by the yellow basal part of both wings. The underside has no markings except the median spot. The female is almost white, its forewing with only a little dark dusting at the distal margin and black, white-centred median spot. Wingspan is from 35 to 52 mm. Its habitats include montane forest roads, trails, glades, and clearings.

== Biology ==
Flight period is from May until September.

Larvae feed on Trifolium and Hedysarum spp.

== Subspecies ==
Listed alphabetically.

- C. c. astraea Edwards, 1872 (Montana, Wyoming, Utah)
- C. c. christina (Montana, Washington, British Columbia, Alberta, Manitoba, Northwest Territories)
