= List of butterflies of North America (Papilionidae) =

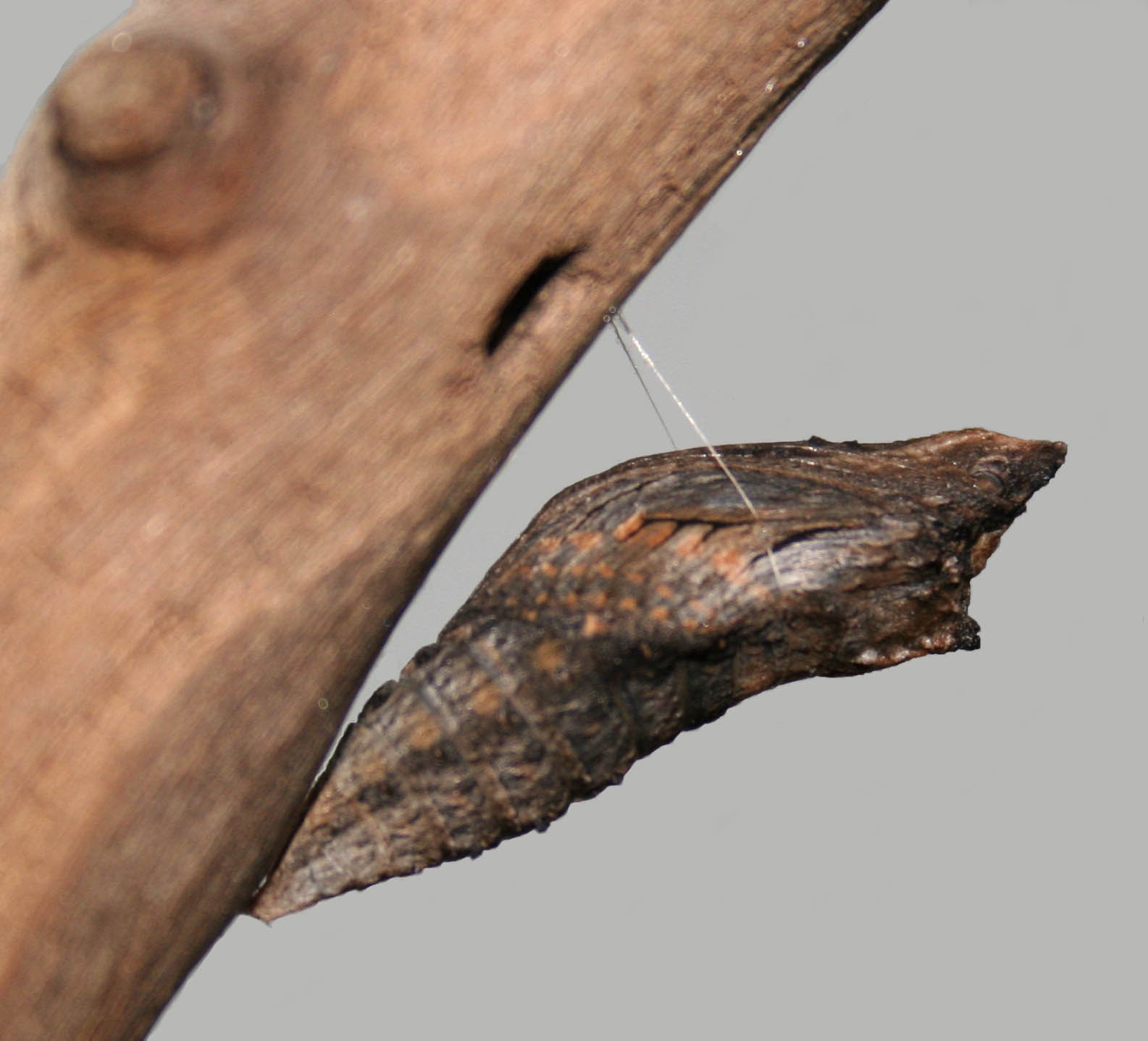
Black swallowtail, Papilio polyxenes, chrysalis

Swallowtails are the largest butterflies. They range in size from 2.5 to 6.4 inches (6.5–16.5 cm). There are about 600 species worldwide with about 31 species in North America. All swallowtails have tails on their hindwings (except the parnassians). Their flight is slow and gliding but, when disturbed, their flight can be quite strong and rapid. They like to feed on various flowers, dung, and urine, and males like to puddle on damp ground. Most male swallowtails locate females by patrolling, and some males perch. The eggs are round and usually laid singly on different kinds of host plants. The larvae have a reddish-orange forked gland, called an osmeterium just behind the head. When frightened, the larva thrusts the gland out releasing a foul odor that will sometimes deter a predator. Many young swallowtail larvae resemble bird droppings. The chrysalis of most species is brown or green and looks like a leaf or branch. It is held upright by a silken loop around the middle called a girdle. The swallowtails overwinter as a chrysalis.

== Subfamily Parnassiinae: parnassians ==
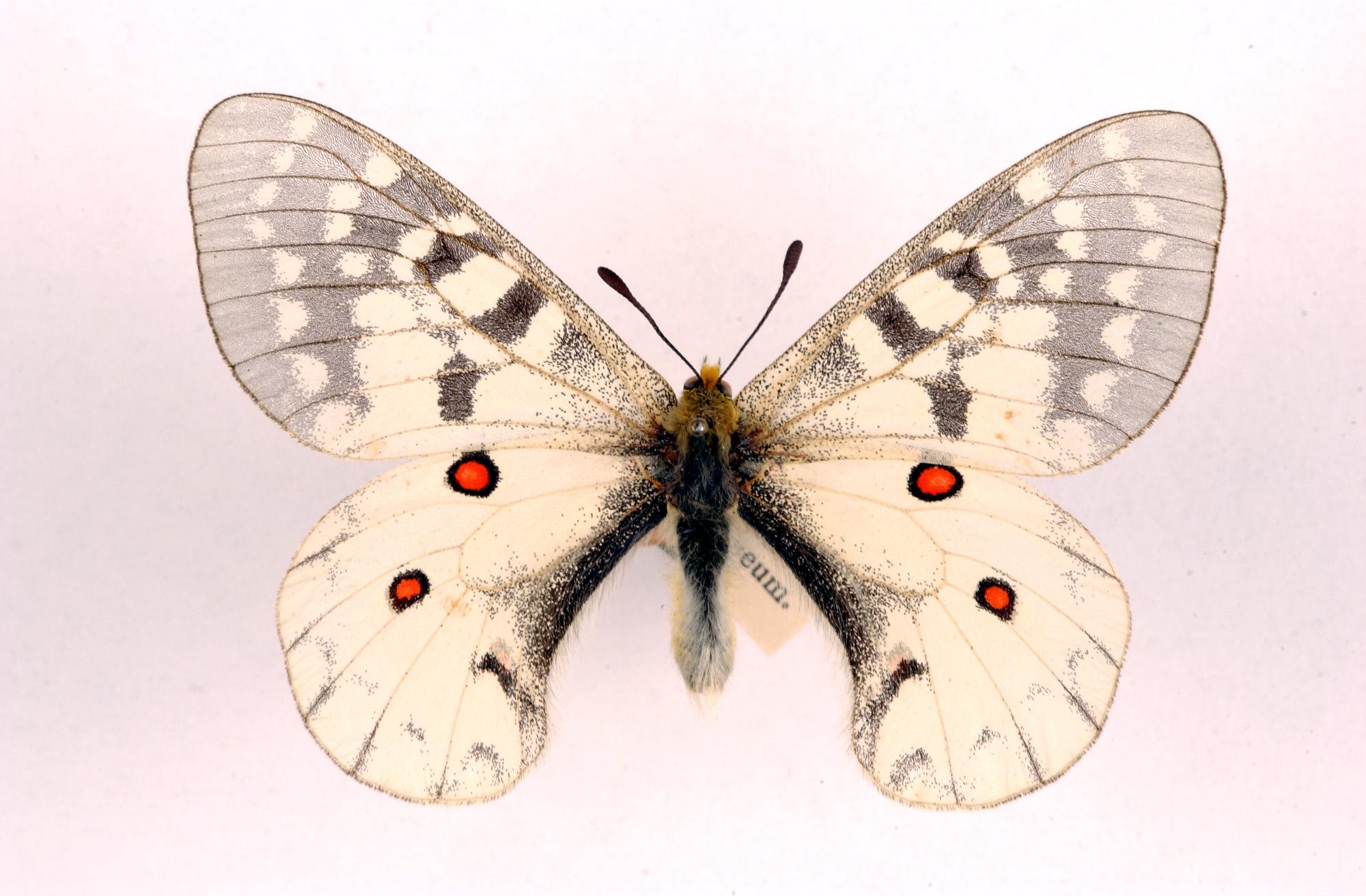
Male Clodius parnassian, Parnassius clodius

- Clodius parnassian, Parnassius clodius
- Eversmann's parnassian, Parnassius eversmanni
- Phoebus parnassian, Parnassius phoebus
  - Phoebus Phoebus parnassian, Parnassius phoebus phoebus
  - Rocky Mountain parnassian, Parnassius phoebus smintheus
  - Sierra Nevada parnassian, Parnassius phoebus behri

== Subfamily Papilioninae: swallowtails ==
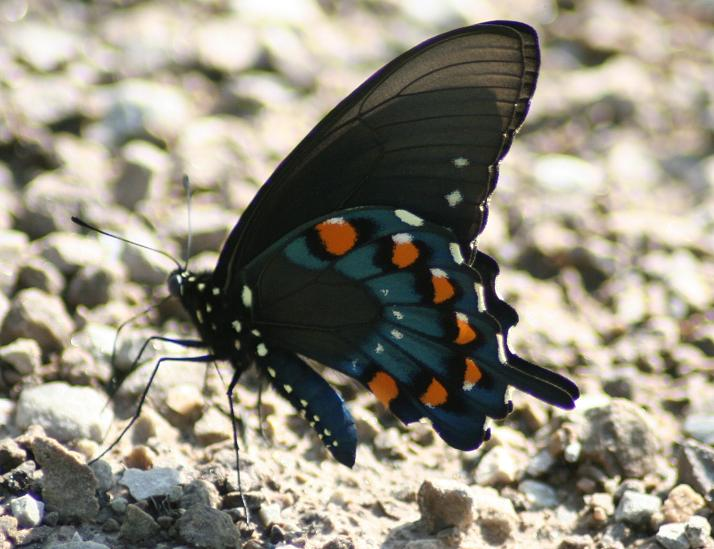
Male pipevine swallowtail, Battus philenor

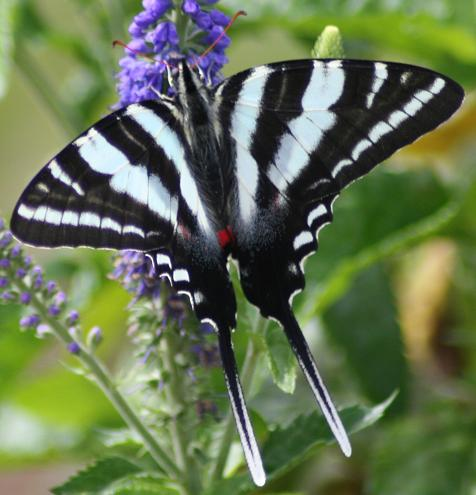
Zebra swallowtail, Protographium marcellus

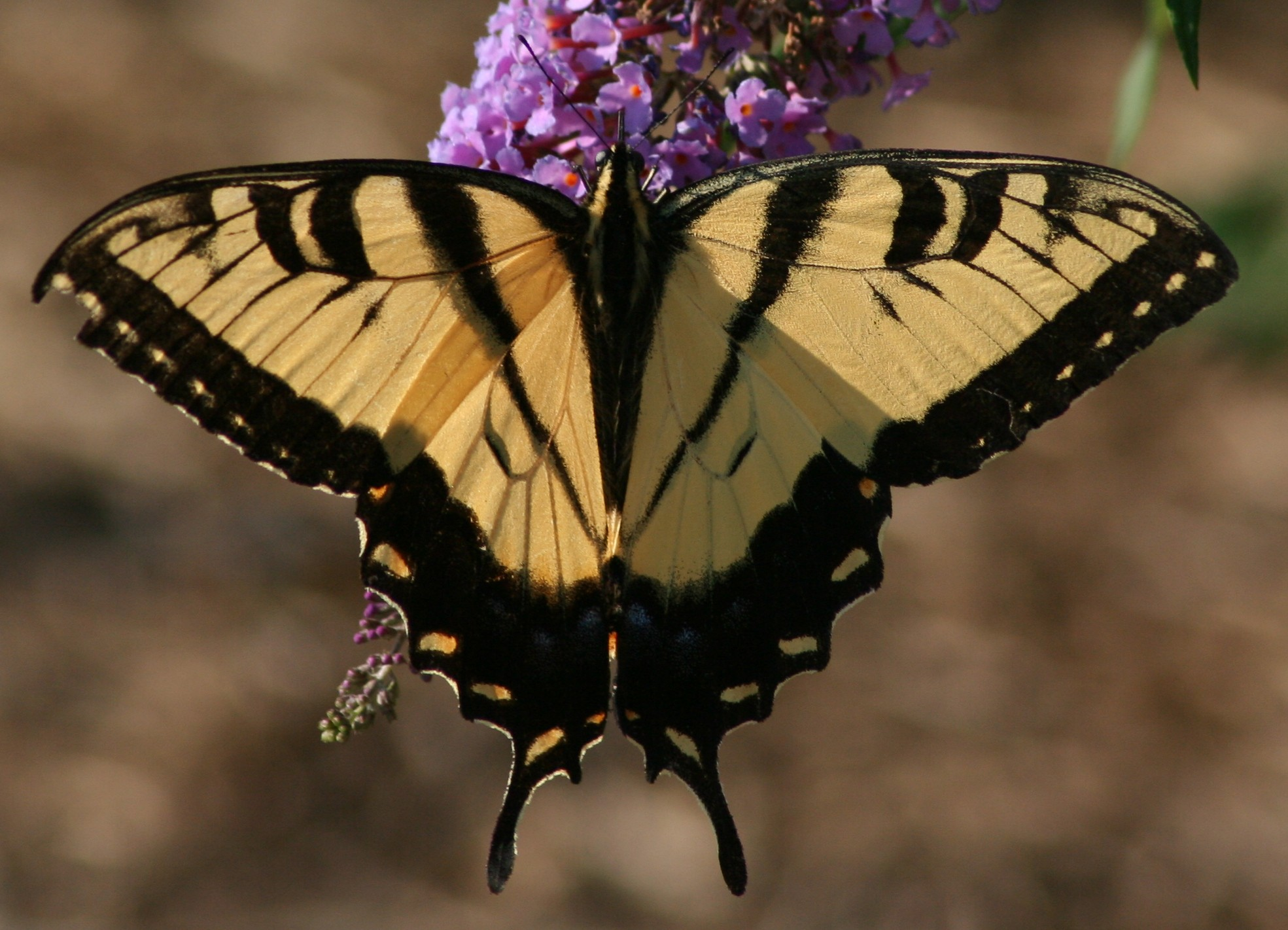
Male eastern tiger swallowtail, Papilio glaucus, on butterfly bush

- Pipevine swallowtail, Battus philenor
- Polydamas swallowtail, Battus polydamas
- Cuban kite swallowtail, Eurytides celadon
- Guatemalan kite-swallowtail, Eurytides epidaus
- Dark kite-swallowtail, Eurytides philolaus
- Red-sided swallowtail, Mimoides phaon
- Ruby-spotted swallowtail, Papilio anchisiades
- Bahamian swallowtail, Papilio andraemon
- Queen swallowtail, Papilio androgeus
- Appalachian tiger swallowtail, Papilio appalachiensis
- Schaus's swallowtail, Papilio aristodemus
- Broad-banded swallowtail, Papilio astyalus
- Short-tailed swallowtail, Papilio brevicauda
- Canadian tiger swallowtail, Papilio canadensis
- Giant swallowtail, Papilio cresphontes
- Pale-spotted swallowtail, Papilio erostratus
- Pale swallowtail, Papilio eurymedon
- Magnificent swallowtail, Papilio garamas
- Eastern tiger swallowtail, Papilio glaucus
- Indra swallowtail, Papilio indra
- Ozark swallowtail, Papilio joanae
- Old World swallowtail, Papilio machaon
  - Baird's Old World swallowtail, Papilio machaon bairdii
  - Oregon swallowtail, Papilio machaon oregonius
- Two-tailed swallowtail, Papilio multicaudata
- Ornythion swallowtail, Papilio ornythion
- Palamedes swallowtail, Papilio palamedes
- Pink-spotted swallowtail, Papilio pharnaces
- Three-tailed swallowtail, Papilio pilumnus
- Black swallowtail, Papilio polyxenes
  - Desert black swallowtail, Papilio polyxenes coloro
- Western tiger swallowtail, Papilio rutulus
- Thoas swallowtail, Papilio thoas
- Band-gapped swallowtail, Papilio torquatus
- Spicebush swallowtail, Papilio troilus
- Victorine swallowtail, Papilio victorinus
- Chinese swallowtail, Papilio xuthus
- Anise swallowtail, Papilio zelicaon
- White-dotted cattleheart, Parides alopius
- Variable cattleheart, Parides erithalion
- Montezuma's cattleheart, Parides montezuma
- Zebra swallowtail, Protographium marcellus
