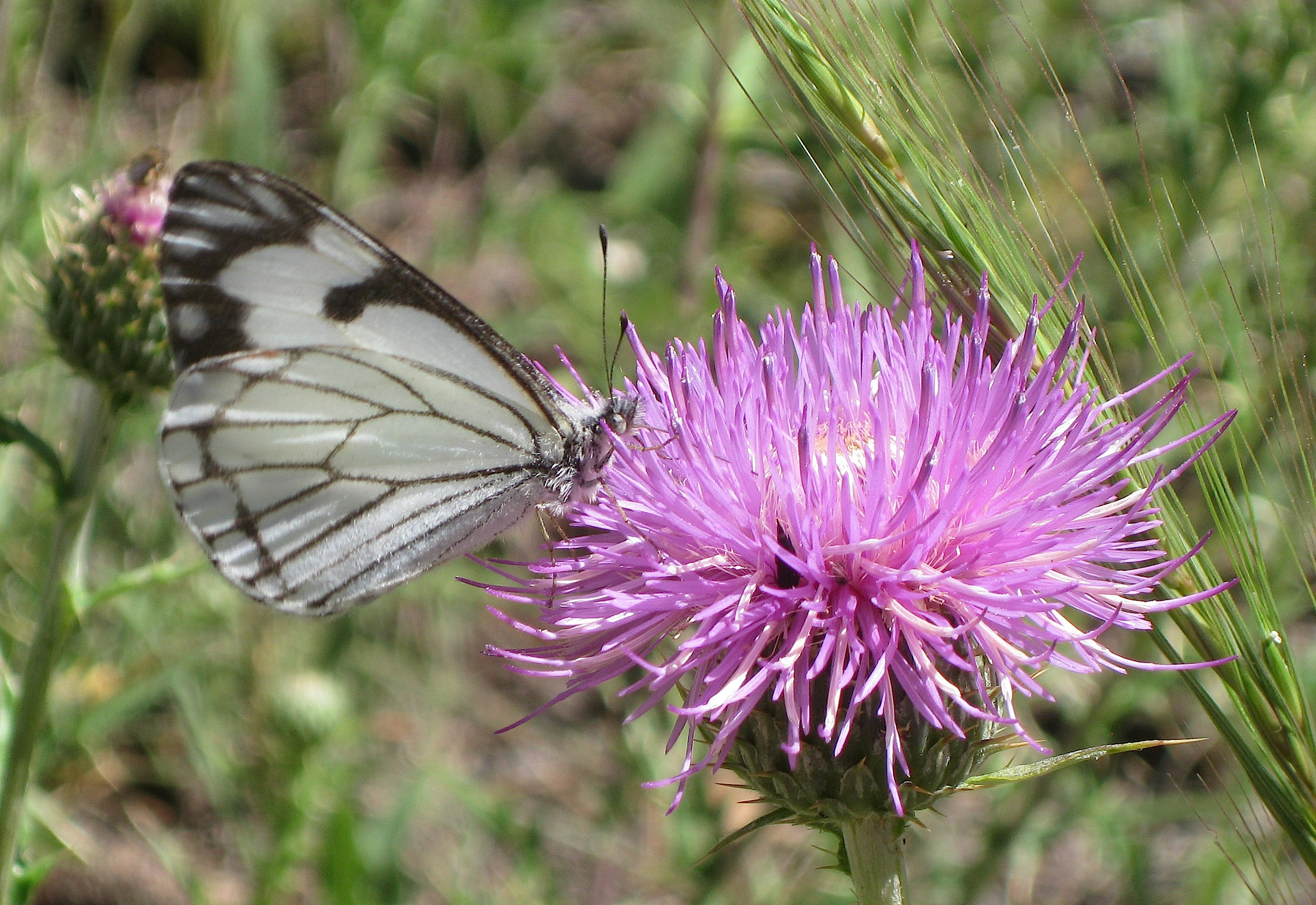
- Male

Conservation status
- Secure (NatureServe)

Scientific classification
- Kingdom: Animalia
- Phylum: Arthropoda
- Clade: Pancrustacea
- Class: Insecta
- Order: Lepidoptera
- Family: Pieridae
- Genus: Neophasia
- Species: N. menapia

Binomial name
- Neophasia menapia (C. & R. Felder, 1859)

Synonyms
- Pieris ninonia; Neophasia menapia f. nigracosta

= Neophasia menapia =

Species of butterfly

Neophasia menapia, the pine white, is a butterfly in the family Pieridae. It is found in the western United States and in southern British Columbia, Canada.

It is mostly white with black veins and wing bars. The species is similar to Neophasia terlooii but their ranges only overlap in New Mexico.

The wingspan is 42–50 millimetres (1.7–2.0 in). Its habitats include pine forests and Douglas fir forests in northern coastal California.

The host plants are Pinus species, Pseudotsuga menziesii, Tsuga heterophylla, Abies balsamea, Abies grandis, and Picea sitchensis. Adults feed on flower nectar from rabbitbrush, other yellow-flowered composites, and monarda.

Neophasia menapia are a univoltine species that lay their eggs on live pine needles, as stated by a scientific research paper ("Phylogeography and the population genertics of pine butterflies") that details the differences between Neophasia.

== Subspecies ==
Subspecies include:

- Neophasia menapia menapia
- Neophasia menapia tau (Scudder, 1861)
- Neophasia menapia melanica Scott, 1981
- Neophasia menapia tehachapina Emmel, Emmel & Mattoon, 1998
- Neophasia menapia megamenapia Austin, 1998
