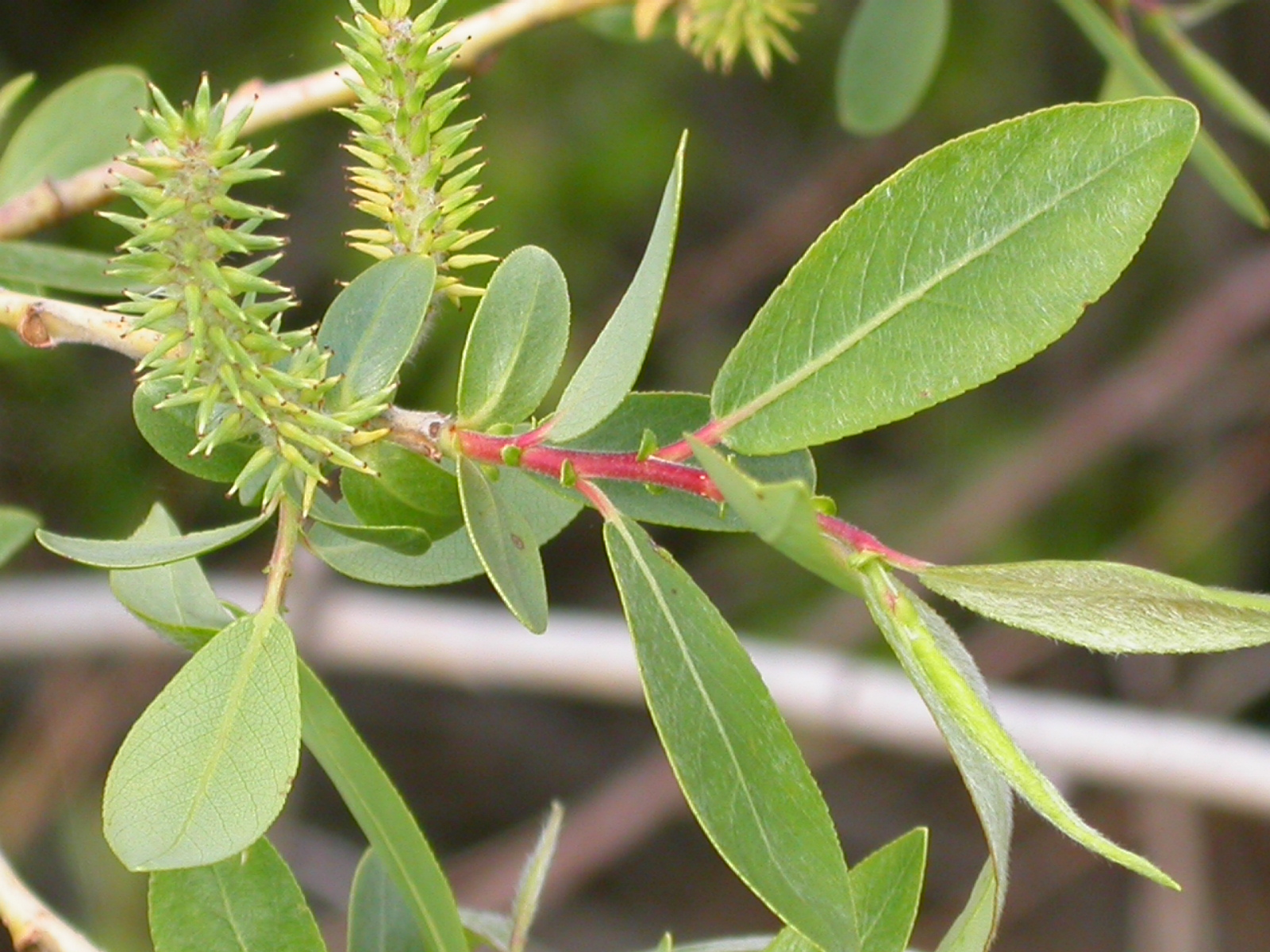

Conservation status
- Least Concern (IUCN 3.1)

Scientific classification
- Kingdom: Plantae
- Clade: Tracheophytes
- Clade: Angiosperms
- Clade: Eudicots
- Clade: Rosids
- Order: Malpighiales
- Family: Salicaceae
- Genus: Salix
- Species: S. lutea

Binomial name
- Salix lutea C.K.Schneid.

= Salix lutea =

Species of willow

Salix lutea is a species of willow known by the common name yellow willow. It is native to North America, including central Canada and parts of the western and central United States, with the exception of the Great Basin. It can be found in moist and wet habitat types, such as riverbanks, meadows, and gullies. It is a shrub up to 7 m tall, sometimes forming colonial thickets or becoming erect and treelike. The lance-shaped leaves may grow over 11 cm long and may have smooth, lightly serrated, wavy, or gland-studded edges. The inflorescence is a catkin of flowers up to 4 or 5 cm long, stout to slender in shape.

This and other willow species are used in revegetation projects in riparian habitat where erosion is a problem. This species reproduces vegetatively by sprouting from pieces of stem, but its primary method of reproduction is sexual, by the dispersal of a large amount of wind-carried seed.
