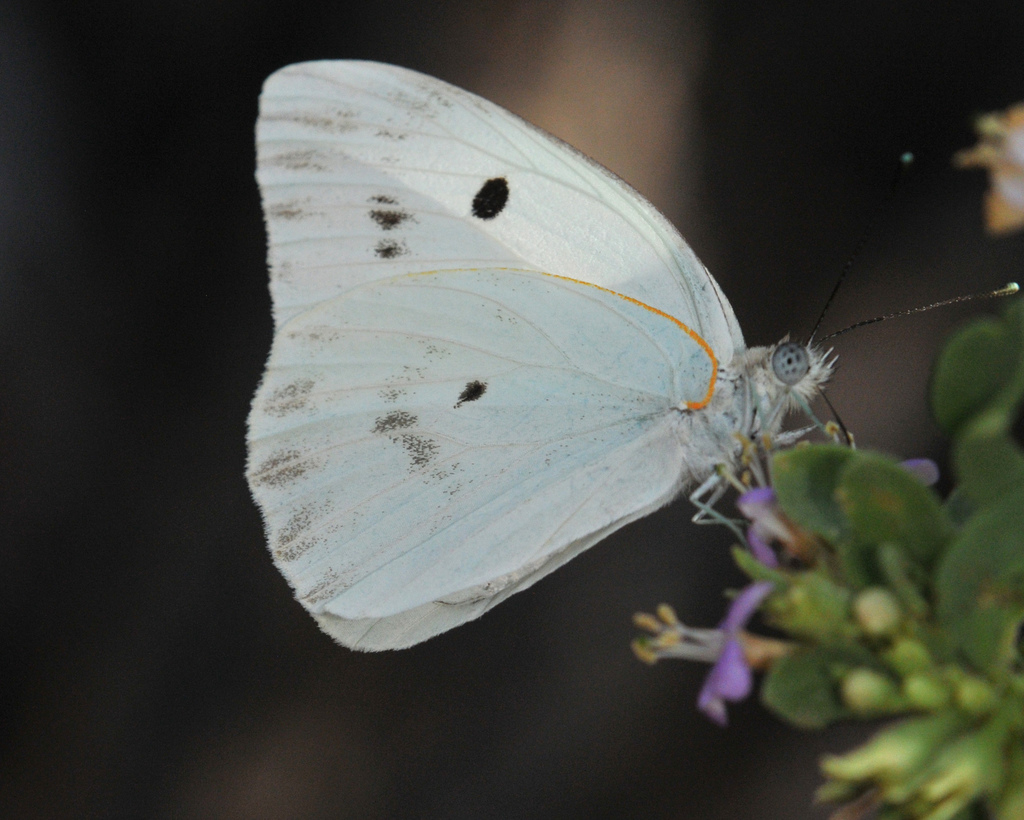

Scientific classification
- Kingdom: Animalia
- Phylum: Arthropoda
- Class: Insecta
- Order: Lepidoptera
- Family: Pieridae
- Genus: Ganyra
- Species: G. howarthi

Binomial name
- Ganyra howarthi (Dixey, 1915)

Synonyms
- Pieris howarthi Dixey, 1915; Pieris kuschei Schaus, 1920

= Ganyra howarthi =

Howarth's white

Species of butterfly

Ganyra howarthi, Howarth's white, is a butterfly in the family Pieridae. It is found along the coast in the southern half of Baja California and Sonora in Mexico. It is also found in extreme southern Arizona. The habitat consists of thorn forests and desert scrubs.

== Description ==
The upperside of the wings are white. The forewing contains black wedges at apex and outer margins, including a black cell spot. On females, markings are diffuse, with additional postmedian black spots. The wingspan is 45–48 mm (1.8–1.9 in).
