= Catasticta lisa =

Scientific classification
- Kingdom: Animalia
- Phylum: Arthropoda
- Class: Insecta
- Order: Lepidoptera
- Family: Pieridae
- Genus: Catasticta
- Species: C. lisa

Binomial name
- Catasticta lisa Baumann & Reissinger, 1969

Species of butterfly

Catasticta lisa is a butterfly in the family Pieridae found in Peru. The species was first described by Baumann and Reissinger in 1969.
