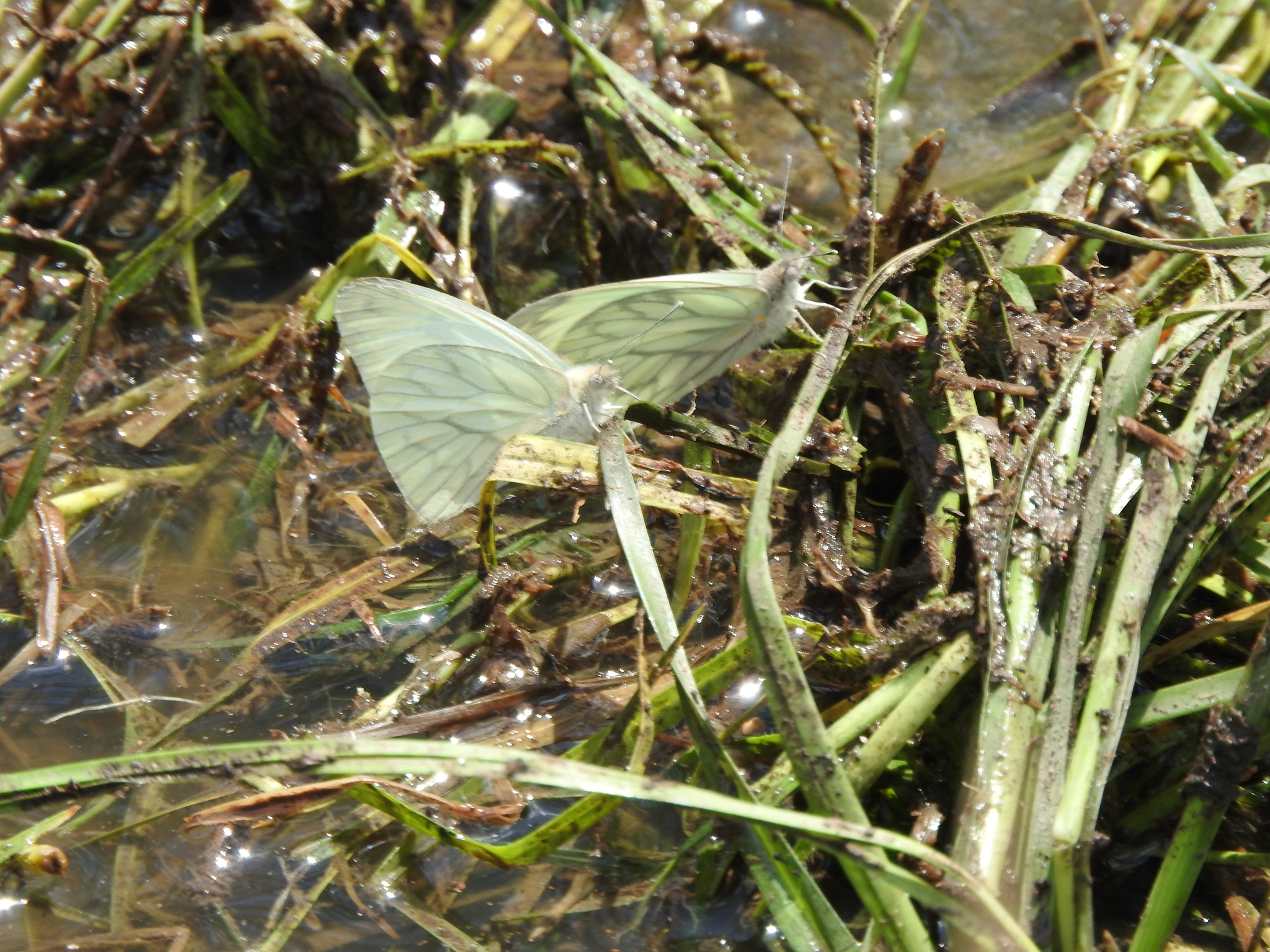
- Hesperocharis costaricensis pasion

Scientific classification
- Kingdom: Animalia
- Phylum: Arthropoda
- Class: Insecta
- Order: Lepidoptera
- Family: Pieridae
- Genus: Hesperocharis
- Species: H. costaricensis

Binomial name
- Hesperocharis costaricensis Bates, 1866

Synonyms
- Pieris pasion Reakirt, [1867]; Hesperocharis pasion; Hesperocharis antipater Druce, 1874

= Hesperocharis costaricensis =

Species of butterfly

Hesperocharis costaricensis, the pallid tilewhite or Costa Rican white, is a butterfly in the family Pieridae. It is found from Mexico, through Central America to Venezuela.

Adults are on wing from February to March and again from June to July in Mexico.

== Subspecies ==
The following subspecies are recognised:

- Hesperocharis costaricensis costaricensis (Costa Rica)
- Hesperocharis costaricensis pasion (Reakirt, [1867]) (Mexico, Guatemala) - Pasion tile-white
