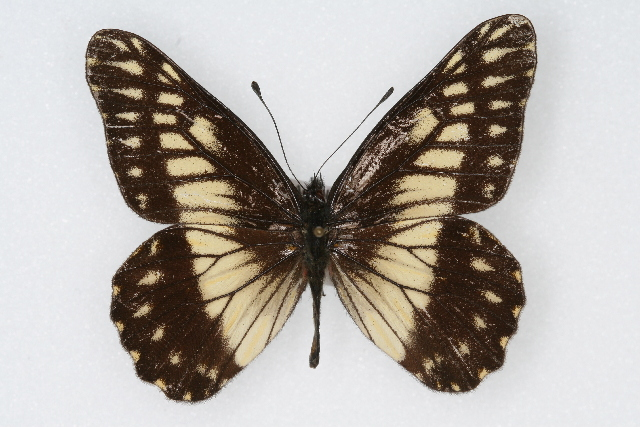

Scientific classification
- Kingdom: Animalia
- Phylum: Arthropoda
- Class: Insecta
- Order: Lepidoptera
- Family: Pieridae
- Genus: Catasticta
- Species: C. nimbice

Binomial name
- Catasticta nimbice (Boisduval, 1836)

Synonyms
- Euterpe nimbice Boisduval, [1836]; Euterpe ochracea Bates, 1864; Catasticta nimbice bryson Röber, 1908 (preocc. Godman & Salvin, 1889); Catasticta bryson Godman & Salvin, [1889]

= Catasticta nimbice =

Species of butterfly

Catasticta nimbice, the pine white or Mexican dartwhite, is a butterfly in the family Pieridae. It is found from Costa Rica north to Mexico. Rare strays can be found as far north as the Chisos Mountains of western Texas.

== Description ==
The upperside of the wing is cream-tan with thick black veins. On the butterfly, wide black outer margins surround cream-colored spots. The wingspan is 45–57 mm (1.8–2.2 in). Adults are on wing year round in Mexico. They have been recorded feeding on nectar from Fuchsia, Lantana and Senecio species in Costa Rica.

The larvae feed on parasitic mistletoes, including Struthanthus species and Phoradendron velutinum.

== Subspecies ==
The following subspecies are recognized:

- Catasticta nimbice nimbice (Mexico)
- Catasticta nimbice ochracea (Bates, 1864) (Guatemala)
- Catasticta nimbice bryson Godman & Salvin, [1889] (Costa Rica, Panama)
- Catasticta nimbice ligata Eitschberger & Racheli, 1998 (Panama)
