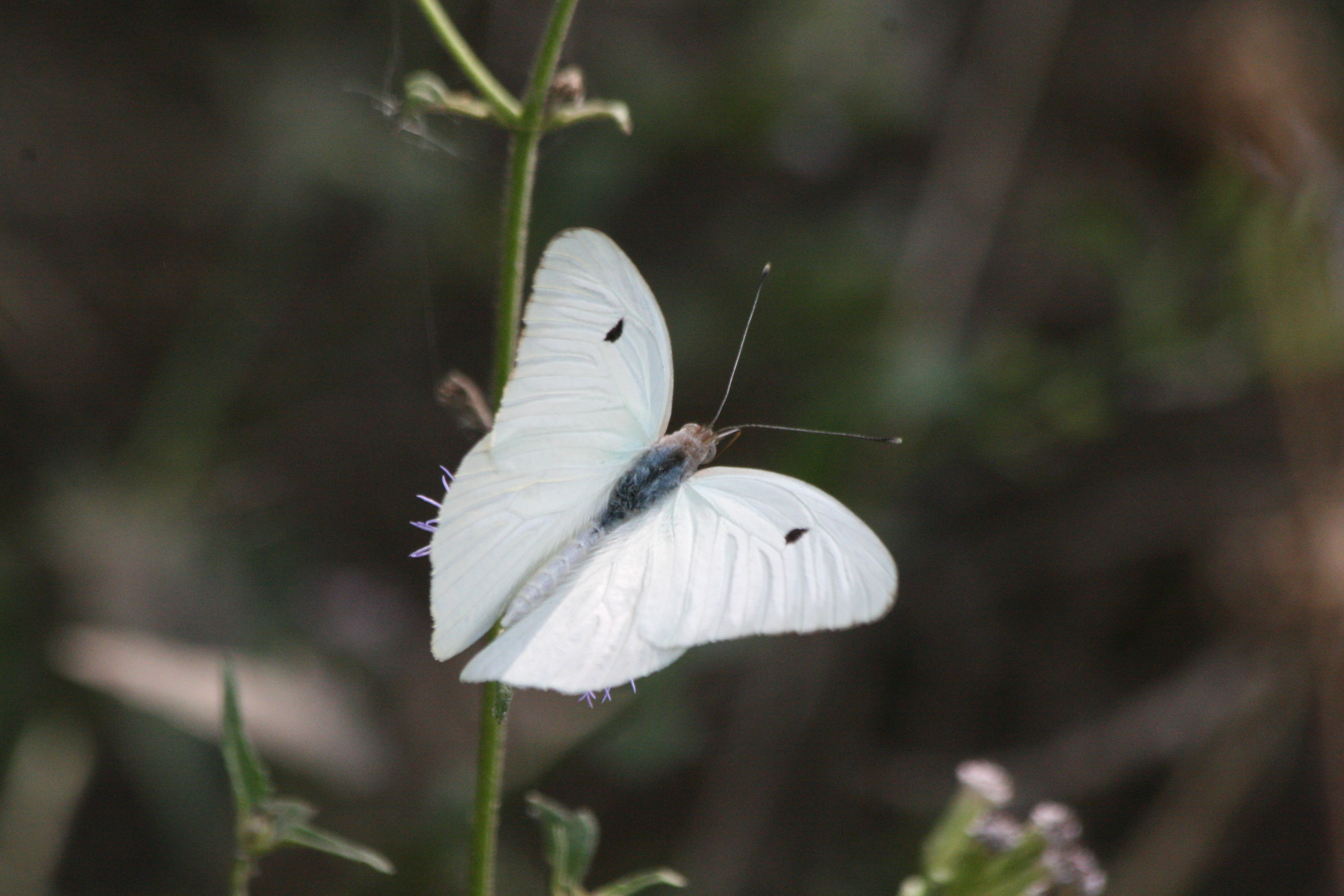

Scientific classification
- Kingdom: Animalia
- Phylum: Arthropoda
- Class: Insecta
- Order: Lepidoptera
- Family: Pieridae
- Genus: Ganyra
- Species: G. josephina

Binomial name
- Ganyra josephina (Godart, [1819])

Synonyms
- Pieris josephina Godart, [1819]; Tachyris amaryllis; Ascia josephina; Papilio amaryllis Fabricius, 1793 (preocc. Stoll, 1782); Pieris josepha Salvin & Godman, 1868; Pieris amaryllis josepha f. gervasia Fruhstorfer, 1907; Pieris amaryllis protasia Fruhstorfer, 1907; Ascia paramaryllis

= Ganyra josephina =

Giant white

Species of butterfly

Ganyra josephina, the giant white, is a butterfly in the family Pieridae.

== Subspecies ==
The following subspecies are recognized:

- G. j. josephina - nominate subspecies (Hispaniola; Dominican Republic, Haiti)
- G. j. josepha (Salvin & Godman, 1868) (southern Texas, Mexico, Guatemala, Honduras, Nicaragua)
- G. j. krugii (Dewitz, 1877) (Puerto Rico, Mona Island)
- G. j. janeta (Dixey, 1915) (Venezuela, Trinidad)
- G. j. paramaryllis (Comstock, 1943) (Jamaica)

The former subspecies Ganyra josephina menciae, the Cuban white, has been separated as its own species, Ganyra menciae.

== Distribution and habitat ==
It is found from southern Texas through Mexico, the Caribbean and Central America to northern South America. The habitat consists of open, dry, subtropical forests.

== Description ==
The wingspan is 73–96 mm (2.9–3.8 in). Adults are on wing from September to December in southern Texas. They feed on flower nectar from a variety of weeds and garden plants including Lantana, Eupatorium and Bougainvillea.

The larvae feed on older leaves of Capparidaceae species.
