= Cheilosia uviformis =

Scientific classification
- Kingdom: Animalia
- Phylum: Arthropoda
- Clade: Pancrustacea
- Class: Insecta
- Order: Diptera
- Family: Syrphidae
- Genus: Cheilosia
- Species: C. uviformis

Binomial name
- Cheilosia uviformis (Becker, 1894)

Species of fly

Cheilosia uviformis is a Palearctic hoverfly. It is found in Fennoscandia south to the Pyrenees and from Ireland eastwards through Central Europe to Yugoslavia.

== Determination ==
External imagesCheilosia uviformis is closely related to several species in theCheilosia proxima group and difficult to identify.
