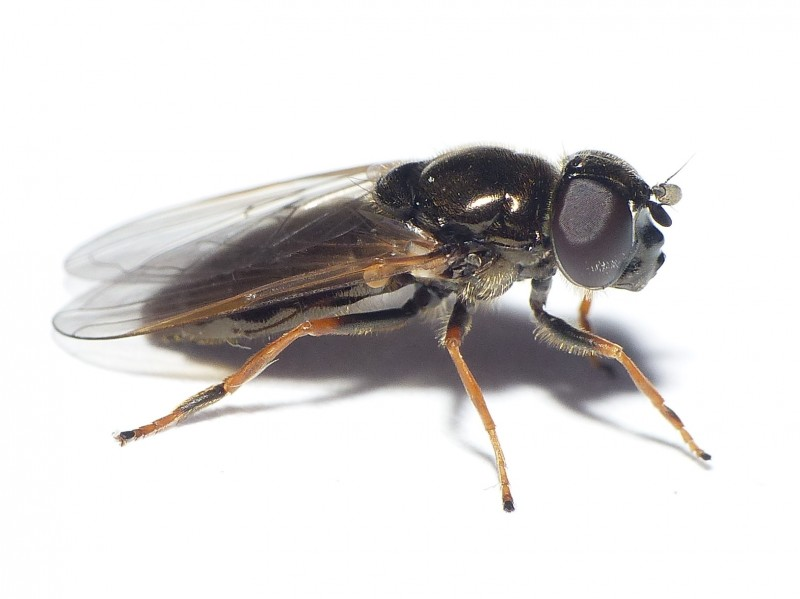

Scientific classification
- Kingdom: Animalia
- Phylum: Arthropoda
- Clade: Pancrustacea
- Class: Insecta
- Order: Diptera
- Family: Syrphidae
- Genus: Cheilosia
- Species: C. psilophthalma

Binomial name
- Cheilosia psilophthalma (Becker, 1894)

= Cheilosia psilophthalma =

Species of insect

Cheilosia psilophthalma is a Palearctic hoverfly closely related and very similar to Cheilosia latigenis, Cheilosia mutabilis and Cheilosia urbana . It is a rare and little known species recorded from Scandinavia, Ireland, Britain, France, Poland, Switzerland, Greece, Montenegro, Serbia, Ukraine and European Russia. Flowers visited include Acer platanoides, Anemone nemorosa, Primula veris, Prunus spinosa and Salix spp. Cheilosia psilophthalma flies in April and May (July at higher altitudes). Open, grassy areas within sparse woodland and unimproved, montane subalpine grassland are preferred habitats. Larvae are recorded as developing in Hieracium pilosella and Hieracium caespitosum.
