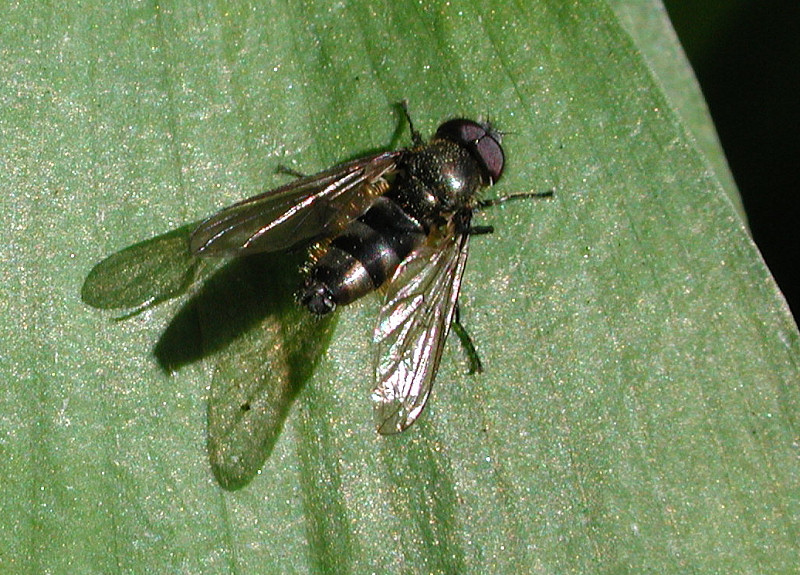
- Cheilosia fasciata male

Scientific classification
- Kingdom: Animalia
- Phylum: Arthropoda
- Clade: Pancrustacea
- Class: Insecta
- Order: Diptera
- Family: Syrphidae
- Genus: Cheilosia
- Species: C. fasciata

Binomial name
- Cheilosia fasciata Schiner & Egger, 1853

= Cheilosia fasciata =

Species of fly

Cheilosia fasciata is a European species of hoverfly. Like most Cheilosia it is mostly black,

Cheilosia semifasciata (Becker, 1894) is often misidentified as Cheilosia fasciata.

== Distribution ==
It is widespread in Europe, but absent from Great Britain.

== Biology ==
It is usually found in association with ramsons (Allium ursinum).
