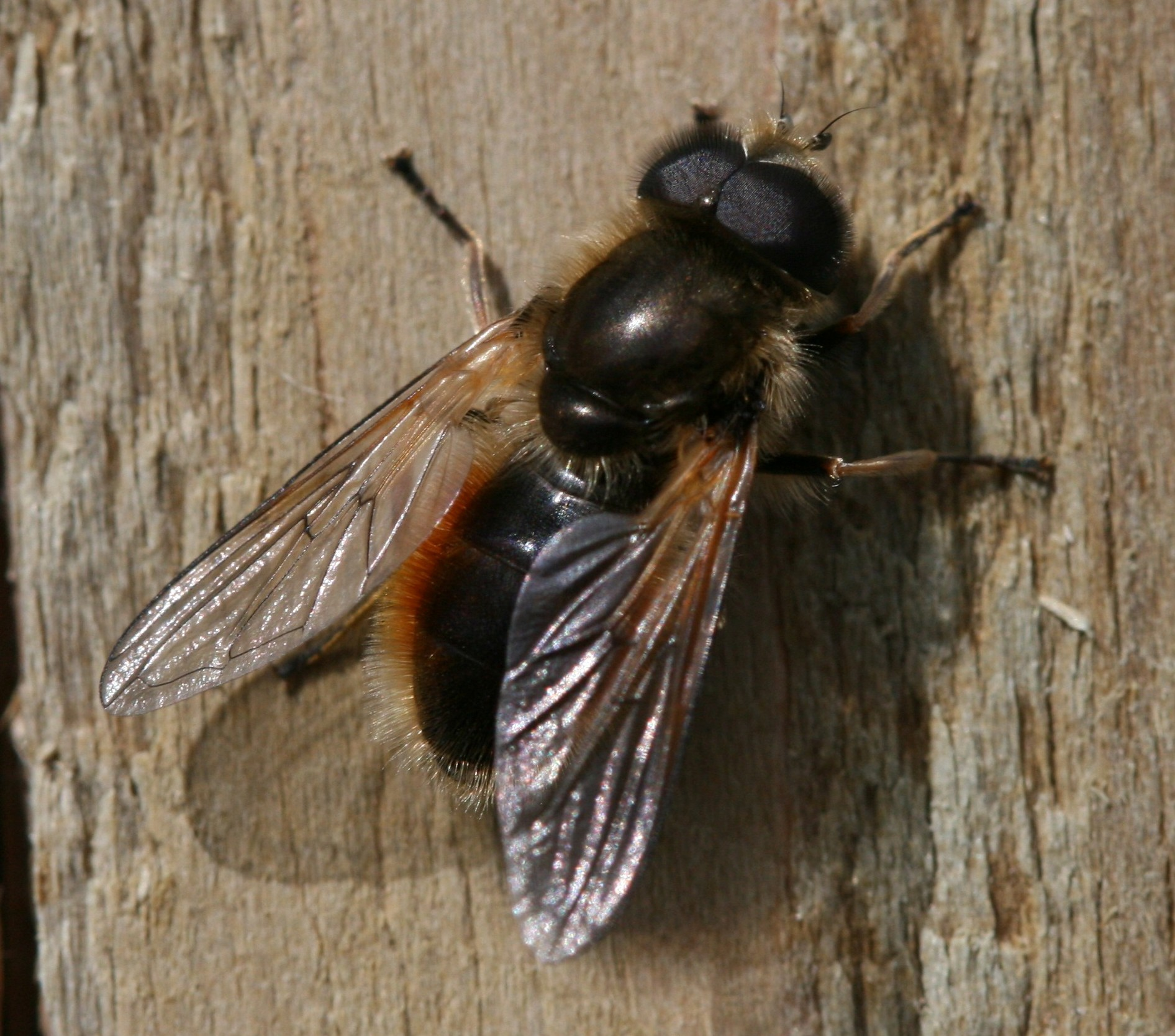
- Male
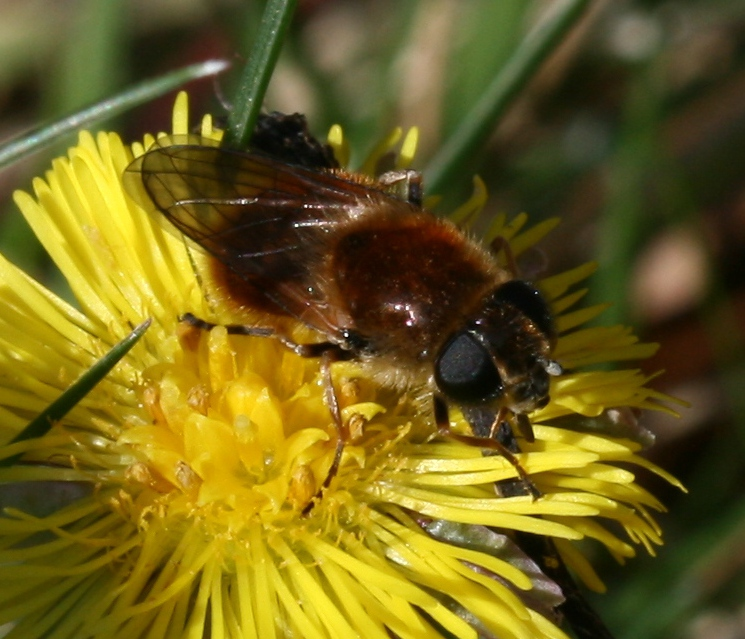
- Female

Scientific classification
- Kingdom: Animalia
- Phylum: Arthropoda
- Clade: Pancrustacea
- Class: Insecta
- Order: Diptera
- Family: Syrphidae
- Genus: Cheilosia
- Species: C. grossa

Binomial name
- Cheilosia grossa (Fallén, 1817)

= Cheilosia grossa =

Species of fly

Cheilosia grossa is a widespread European species of hoverfly. Adults can be found in spring on sallow catkins and the larvae tunnel in the stems of various thistle species.

== Description ==
For terms see Morphology of Diptera

The wing length is 8·5-11·75 mm. Differs from Cheilosia chrysocoma in these characters. Segment 3 of antennae brown to black. Pubescence foxy-tawny. All tarsi segments black.

== Distribution ==
Most of the Palearctic and the western North America.

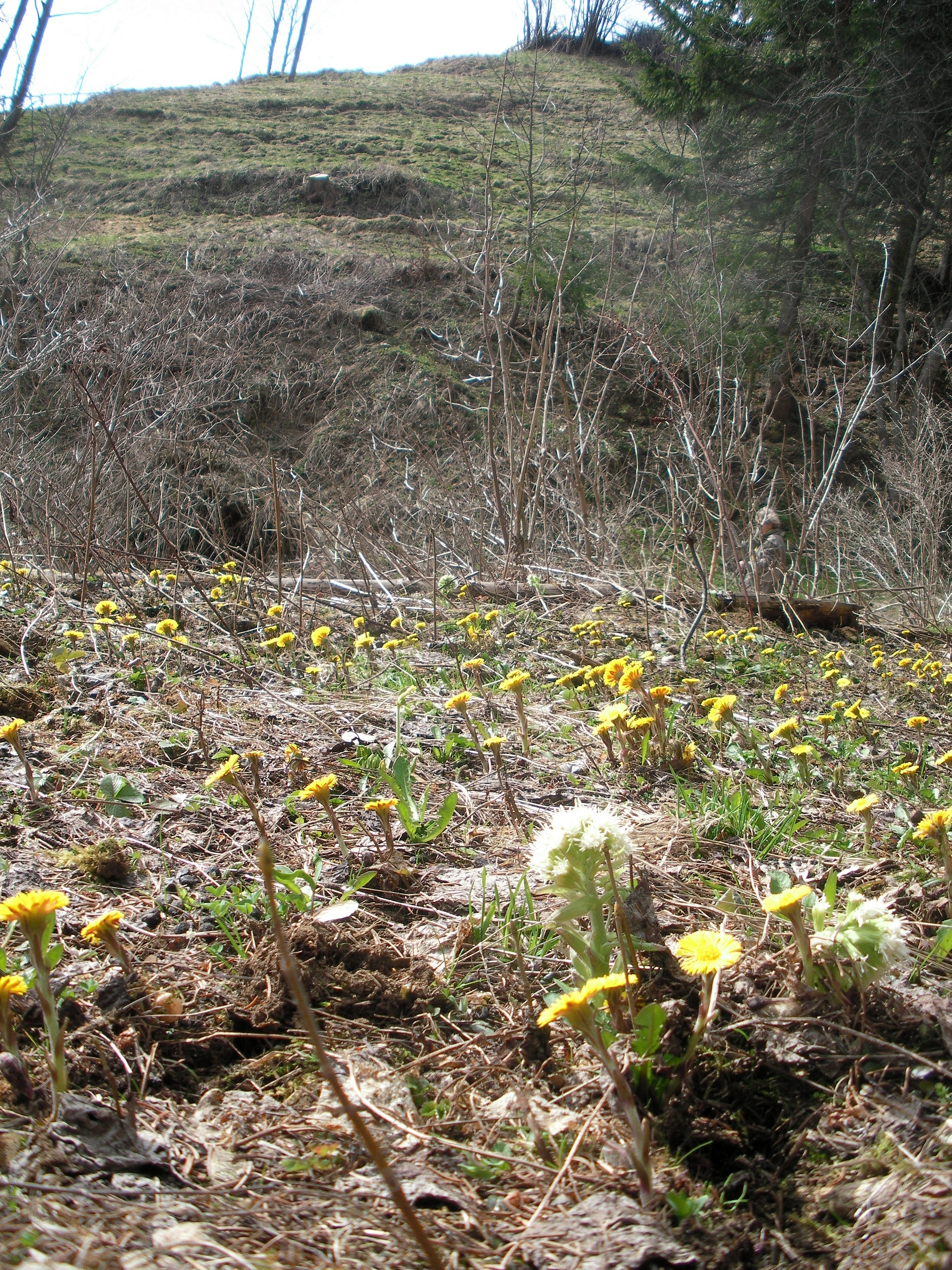
Habitat.Austria

== Biology ==
Deciduous forest in open areas, clearings and tracksides in woodland and scrub; poorly drained pasture. Flowers visited include Anemone nemorosa, Corylus, Prunus spinosa, Ranunculus, Salix, Taraxacum, Tussilago. Flies in March and April, (later at higher altitudes).
