= Cheilosia griseiventris =

Scientific classification
- Kingdom: Animalia
- Phylum: Arthropoda
- Clade: Pancrustacea
- Class: Insecta
- Order: Diptera
- Family: Syrphidae
- Genus: Cheilosia
- Species: C. griseiventris

Binomial name
- Cheilosia griseiventris (Loew, 1857)

Species of fly

Cheilosia griseiventris is a Palearctic hoverfly. It is not considered as distinct from Cheilosia latifrons (= Cheilosia intonsa) by most European workers. It is variously treated in other and older works.
