= Cheilosia nigripes =

Scientific classification
- Kingdom: Animalia
- Phylum: Arthropoda
- Clade: Pancrustacea
- Class: Insecta
- Order: Diptera
- Family: Syrphidae
- Genus: Cheilosia
- Species: C. nigripes

Binomial name
- Cheilosia nigripes (Meigen, 1822)

Synonyms
- Syrphus tropicus Meigen, 1822; Eristalis schmidtii Zetterstedt, 1843; Eristalis lugubris Zetterstedt, 1838; Cartosyrphus castaneiventris Bigot, 1884; Chilosia minuta Hellen, 1914

Species of fly

Cheilosia nigripes is a Palearctic hoverfly.

== Description ==
Very similar to Cheilosia vicina with a black body bare eyes, black legs and fused antennal pits. The central prominence of the face gently slopes downwards (not retrousse). Male: all the thorax hairs black the tergites with fine punctures. Female:thorax with mainly dark hairs and tergites with coarse punctures. Wing length 6·25-7·5 mm

== Distribution and biology ==
From Fennoscandia south to the Pyrenees; from England eastwards through Central and Southern Europe (north Italy, Yugoslavia) into Turkey and European Russia through Siberia and the Russian Far East to the Pacific. The habitat is open grassy areas in Fagus, Abies and Picea forest up to the lowest levels of subalpine grassland. Flowers visited include white umbellifers Prunus padus, Ranunculus, Rubus idaeus, Taraxacum. Flies May to June, later at higher altitudes. The larva is undescribed.
