= C. antiqua =

C. antiqua may refer to one of the following species:

- Cheilosia antiqua, a hoverfly species
- Condorchelys antiqua, a stem turtle species from Middle to Upper Jurassic of Argentina
- Cyrnaonyx antiqua, an extinct genus of otters
