= Cheilosia prima =

Scientific classification
- Kingdom: Animalia
- Phylum: Arthropoda
- Clade: Pancrustacea
- Class: Insecta
- Order: Diptera
- Family: Syrphidae
- Genus: Cheilosia
- Species: C. prima

Binomial name
- Cheilosia prima (Hunter 1896)

Synonyms
- Cartosyrphus slossonae (Shannon, 1922); Chilosia ontario (Curran, 1922); Chilosia prima (Hunter, 1896); Chilosia slossoni (Shannon, 1922)

Species of insect

Cheilosia prima (Hunter 1896), the swarthy blacklet, is a common species of syrphid fly observed in the eastern half of North America. Hoverflies can remain nearly motionless in flight. The adults are also known as flower flies for they are commonly found on flowers from which they get both energy-giving nectar and protein rich pollen. Larvae when known are plant feeders.
