= Cheilosia barbata =

Scientific classification
- Kingdom: Animalia
- Phylum: Arthropoda
- Clade: Pancrustacea
- Class: Insecta
- Order: Diptera
- Family: Syrphidae
- Genus: Cheilosia
- Species: C. barbata

Binomial name
- Cheilosia barbata Loew, 1857

Species of fly

Cheilosia barbata is a Palearctic hoverfly.

== Description ==
Resembles several other Cheilosia. Determination is problematic. Key references include Van der Goot, V.S. (1981) The male terminalia are illustrated Stubbs and Falk (1983).

== Distribution and biology ==
It is found from Fennoscandia south to central Spain and Britain east through most of Central Europe to parts of European Russia and through high altitude areas of southern Europe to Yugoslavia in deciduous woodland. Adults visit flowers of Caltha, Chaerophyllum, Crataegus, Euphorbia, Ranunculus, Sambucus, Taraxacum from May to August.
