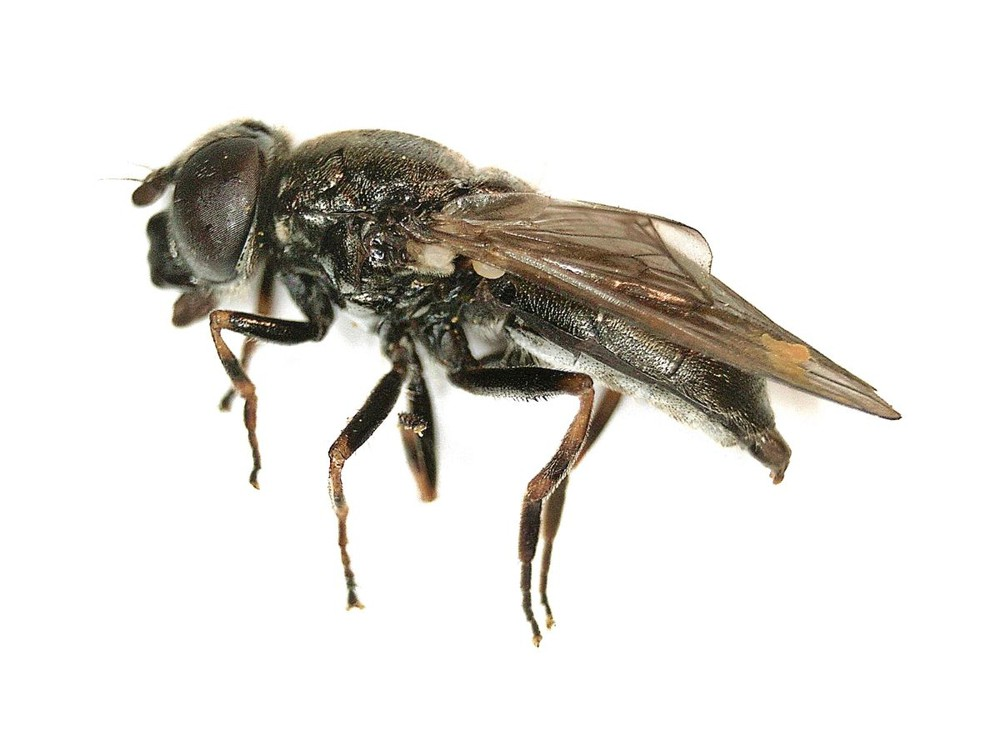
- Cheilosia cynocephala Elst, Gelderland, the Netherlands

Scientific classification
- Kingdom: Animalia
- Phylum: Arthropoda
- Clade: Pancrustacea
- Class: Insecta
- Order: Diptera
- Family: Syrphidae
- Genus: Cheilosia
- Species: C. cynocephala

Binomial name
- Cheilosia cynocephala Loew, 1840

Synonyms
- Eristalis rostrata Zetterstedt, 1843; Eristalis coracina Zetterstedt, 1843

= Cheilosia cynocephala =

Species of fly

Cheilosia cynocephala is a Palearctic species of hoverfly.

== Description ==
A black Cheilosia with a bluish sheen, darkened wings and dark hairs.

== Distribution and biology ==
It is found from Fennoscandia south to central France and England eastwards through Central Europe and on into central Russia.Southwards into the mountains of northern Italy and Yugoslavia. The habitat is open ground near rivers, streams or flushes in unimproved grassland, usually on calcareous soils, including montane pasture. where it flies from July–October. The larvae mine the stems of Carduus nutans. Adults visit white umbellifers, Calluna vulgaris., Cirsium arvense, Parnassia palustris, Pulicaria, Ranunculus, Salix repens, Saxifraga azoides, Scabiosa, Senecio Sonchus...
