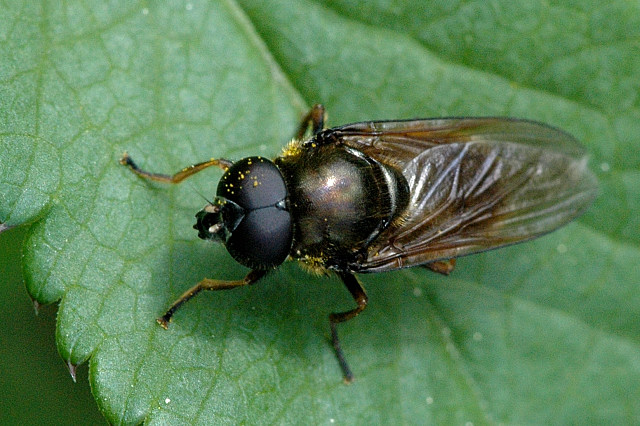
- Cheilosia albipila male

Scientific classification
- Kingdom: Animalia
- Phylum: Arthropoda
- Class: Insecta
- Order: Diptera
- Family: Syrphidae
- Subfamily: Eristalinae
- Tribe: Rhingiini
- Subtribe: Cheilosiina
- Genus: Cheilosia; Meigen, 1822

Synonyms
- Chilosia Agassiz, 1846

= Cheilosia =

Genus of insects

Cheilosia is a genus of hoverfly. Most Cheilosia are black or largely un-coloured, lacking the bright colours and patterns of many hoverfly species. It is one of the most species diverse genera of hoverflies. The biology of many species is little understood, but where known, the larvae of Cheilosia species feed in the stems of plants or in fungi.

== Systematics ==
Species include:

- C. abagoensis Scufjin, 1979
- C. abbreviata Shiraki, 1953
- C. aenigmatosa Barkalov, 1993
- C. aerea (Dufour, 1848)
- C. ahenea (von Roser, 1840)
- C. alaskensis (Hunter, 1897)
- C. alba Vujic & Claussen, 2000
- C. albipila Meigen, 1838
- C. albitarsis (Meigen, 1822)
- C. albohirta (Hellén, 1930)
- C. aldrichi (Hunter, 1896)
- C. alpestris (Becker, 1894)
- C. alpina (Zetterstedt, 1838)
- C. amicorum van der Goot, 1964
- C. andalusiaca Torp Pedersen, 1971
- C. angustigena (Becker, 1894)
- C. annulifemur (Stackelberg, 1930)
- C. antiqua (Meigen, 1822)
- C. aokii Shiraki, 1953
- C. aratica Barkalov, 1978
- C. aristata Barkalov & Ståhls, 1997
- C. arkita Zimina, 1970
- C. armeniaca Stackelberg, 1960
- C. atriseta (Oldenberg, 1916)
- C. atrocapilla Hull and Fluke, 1950
- C. baldensis (Marcuzzi, 1941)
- C. balkana Vujic, 1994
- C. balu Violovitsh, 1966
- C. barbata Loew, 1857
- C. bardus (Harris, 1780)
- C. barkalovi Stahls, 1977
- C. baroni (Williston, 1887)
- C. barovskii (Stackelberg, 1930)
- C. beckeri (Strobl, 1909)
- C. bergenstammi (Becker, 1894)
- C. bicolorata (Shannon, 1922)
- C. bigelowi (Curran, 1926)
- C. bombiformis (Matsumura, 1911)
- C. borealis (Coquillett, 1900)
- C. brachysoma Egger, 1860
- C. bracusi Vujic & Claussen, 1994
- C. brevipennis (Becker, 1894)
- C. brevipila Shiraki, 1968
- C. browni Curran, 1931
- C. brunnipennis (Becker, 1894)
- C. burkei (Shannon, 1922)
- C. caerulescens (Meigen, 1822)
- C. caltha (Shannon, 1922)
- C. canada Hull and Fluke, 1950
- C. canicularis (Panzer, 1801)
- C. capillata (Loew, 1863)
- C. carbonaria Egger, 1860
- C. catalina (Shannon, 1922)
- C. chalybescens (Williston, 1893)
- C. changaica Peck, 1979
- C. chintimini (Lovett, 1921)
- C. chloris (Meigen, 1822)
- C. christophori (Becker, 1894)
- C. chrysochlamys (Williston, 1891)
- C. chrysocoma (Meigen, 1822)
- C. clama Claussen & Vujic, 1995
- C. clausseni Barkalov & Ståhls, 1997
- C. coerulea Fluke and Hull, 1946
- C. columbiae (Curran, 1922)
- C. comosa (Loew, 1863)
- C. conifacies Stackelberg, 1963
- C. consentiens (Curran, 1926)
- C. convexifrons Stackelberg, 1963
- C. cottrelli Telford, 1939
- C. crassiseta Loew, 1859
- C. cratorhina Hull and Fluke, 1950
- C. cumanica (Szilády, 1938)
- C. curvitibia (Becker, 1894)
- C. cyanescens Loew, 1863
- C. cynocephala Loew, 1840
- C. cynoprosopa Hull and Fluke, 1950
- C. cystorhyncha Barkalov, 1999
- C. derasa Loew, 1857
- C. difficilis (Herve-Bazin, 1929)
- C. distincta Barkalov & Cheng, 1998
- C. edashigei Shiraki, 1968
- C. egregia Barkalov & Cheng, 1998
- C. eurodes (Shiraki, 1930)
- C. exigua Barkalov & Peck, 1977
- C. fasciata Schiner & Egger, 1853
- C. faucis (Becker, 1894)
- C. ferruginea (Lovett, 1919)
- C. flavipes (Panzer, 1798)
- C. flavosericea Hull and Fluke, 1950
- C. florella (Shannon, 1922)
- C. formasana (Shiraki, 1930)
- C. fraterna (Meigen, 1830)
- C. frontalis Loew, 1857
- C. gagatea Loew, 1857
- C. gemini (Shannon, 1922)
- C. gerstackeri (Becker, 1894)
- C. gibbosa (Becker, 1894)
- C. gigantea (Zetterstedt, 1838)
- C. gorodkovi Stackelberg, 1963
- C. grahami Barkalov, 1999
- C. granulata (Becker, 1894)
- C. griseifacies Vujic, 1994
- C. griseiventris Loew, 1857
- C. grisella (Becker, 1894)
- C. grossa (Fallén, 1817)
- C. heptapotamica Stackelberg, 1963
- C. herculana Bradescu, 1982
- C. hercyniae Loew, 1857
- C. hermiona Hull and Fluke, 1950
- C. hesperia (Shannon, 1922)
- C. hiantha Hull and Fluke, 1950
- C. himantopa (Panzer, 1798)
- C. honesta Rondani, 1868
- C. hoodiana (Bigot, 1883)
- C. hunteri (Curran, 1922)
- C. hypena (Becker, 1894)
- C. iberica Marcos-Garcia & Claussen, 1989
- C. illustrata (Harris, 1780)
- C. imperfecta (Becker, 1921)
- C. impressa Loew, 1840
- C. impudens (Becker, 1894)
- C. ingerae Nielsen & Claussen, 2001
- C. ingrica Stackelberg, 1958
- C. insignis Loew, 1857
- C. intermedia Barkalov, 1999
- C. iwawakiensis (Shiraki, 1930)
- C. japonica (Hervé-Bazin, 1914)
- C. josankeiana (Shiraki, 1930)
- C. julietta (Shannon, 1922)
- C. katara Claussen & Vujic, 1993
- C. kerteszi (Szilády, 1938)
- C. kirgizorum Peck, 1971
- C. kiritshenkoi Stakelberg, 1963
- C. kolomietsi Barkalov, 1999
- C. kuznetzovae Skufjin, 1977
- C. laevifrons (Jones, 1907)
- C. laeviseta Claussen, 1987
- C. laevis (Bigot, 1884)
- C. laeviventris Loew, 1857
- C. lasiopa (Kowarz, 1885)
- C. lasiophthalmus Williston, 1882
- C. laticornis Rondani, 1857
- C. latifaciella (Shiraki, 1930)
- C. latifrons (Zetterstedt, 1843)
- C. latigena Barkalov & Peck, 1994
- C. latigenis Claussen & Kassebeer, 1993
- C. latrans (Walker, 1849)
- C. lenis (Becker, 1894)
- C. lenta (Becker, 1894)
- C. leucoparea (Loew, 1863)
- C. limbicornis (Strobl, 1909)
- C. livida (Wehr, 1922)
- C. loewi (Becker, 1894)
- C. lola Zimina, 1970
- C. longipennis (Shiraki, 1930)
- C. longiptera Shiraki, 1968
- C. longistyla Barkalov & Peck, 1994
- C. longula (Zetterstedt, 1838)
- C. lucida Barkalov & Cheng, 1998
- C. lucta (Snow, 1895)
- C. lukashovae Barkalov, 1993
- C. luna Hull and Fluke, 1950
- C. lutea Barkalov, 1979
- C. margarita Hull and Fluke, 1950
- C. marginata (Becker, 1894)
- C. matsumurana (Shiraki, 1930)
- C. meganosa Hull and Fluke, 1950
- C. megatarsa Fluke and Hull, 1947
- C. melanopa (Zetterstedt, 1843)
- C. melanura (Becker, 1894)
- C. metallina (Becker, 1894)
- C. milkoi Barkalov, 2003
- C. montana Egger, 1860
- C. montanipes Hull and Fluke, 1950
- C. morio (Zetterstedt, 1838)
- C. motodomariensis Matsumura, 1916
- C. mupinensis Barkalov, 1999
- C. mutabilis (Fallén, 1817)
- C. mutini Barkalov, 1984
- C. nannomorpha Hull and Fluke, 1950
- C. nartshukae Barkalov & Peck, 1977
- C. naruska Haarto & Kerppola, 2007
- C. nasica Hull and Fluke, 1950
- C. nebulosa (Verrall, 1871)
- C. neversicolor Barkalov & Cheng, 1998
- C. nigrescens Hull and Fluke, 1950
- C. nigripes (Meigen, 1822)
- C. nigroapicata (Curran, 1926)
- C. nigrobarba Hull and Fluke, 1950
- C. nigrofasciata (Curran, 1926)
- C. nigrovittata (Lovett, 1919)
- C. nikkoensis (Shiraki, 1930)
- C. nivalis (Becker, 1894)
- C. nuda Shiraki, 1930
- C. nudifacies (Becker, 1821)
- C. nudiseta (Becker, 1894)
- C. obesa Hull and Fluke, 1950
- C. occidentalis Williston, 1882
- C. occulta Barkalov, 1988
- C. okinawae (Shiraki, 1930)
- C. orilliaensis Curran, 1922
- C. orthotricha Vujic & Claussen, 1994
- C. pacifica Hunter, 1897
- C. pagana (Meigen, 1822)
- C. pallipes Loew, 1863
- C. parachloris (Herve-Bazin, 1929)
- C. paralobi Malski, 1962
- C. pascuorum (Becker, 1894)
- C. pedemontana Rondani, 1857
- C. pedestris (Becker, 1894)
- C. personata Loew, 1857
- C. pictipennis Egger, 1860
- C. pikei Shannon, 1922
- C. pilifacies Peck, 1971
- C. pilifer (Becker, 1894)
- C. pilosipes Hull and Fluke, 1950
- C. pini (Becker, 1894)
- C. planifacies (Becker, 1894)
- C. plumbella (Becker, 1894)
- C. plutonia Hunter, 1897
- C. pluto Hull and Fluke, 1950
- C. polita (Becker, 1894)
- C. polja Barkalov, 1990
- C. pollinata Barkalov, 1982
- C. pollinifacies Stackelberg, 1968
- C. pontiaca (Shannon, 1922)
- C. porcina Hull and Fluke, 1950
- C. posjetica Barkalov, 1981
- C. prima (Hunter, 1896)
- C. primoriensis Barkalov, 1990
- C. primoveris (Shannon, 1915)
- C. promethea Hull and Fluke, 1950
- C. proxima (Zetterstedt, 1843)
- C. psilophthalma (Becker, 1894)
- C. pubera (Zetterstedt, 1838)
- C. punctulata (Hunter, 1897)
- C. ranunculi Doczkal, 2000
- C. recens (Becker, 1894)
- C. reniformis (Hellén, 1930)
- C. rhinoprosopa Hull and Fluke, 1950
- C. rhodiolae Schmid, 2000
- C. rhynchops Egger, 1860
- C. rita (Curran, 1922)
- C. robusta (Hine, 1922)
- C. rodgersi (Wainwright, 1911)
- C. romigi (Claußen & Van de Weyer, 2004)
- C. rotundiventris (Becker, 1894)
- C. ruficollis (Becker, 1894)
- C. rufimana (Becker, 1894)
- C. rufiventris Peck, 1969
- C. sahlbergi (Becker, 1894)
- C. sapporensis (Shiraki, 1930)
- C. schineri Egger, 1860
- C. schnabli (Becker, 1894)
- C. scilla Hull and Fluke, 1950
- C. scutellata (Fallén, 1817)
- C. semenovi Barkalov, 2003
- C. semifasciata (Becker, 1894)
- C. sensua (Curran, 1922)
- C. sera Barkalov, 1999
- C. seripila Hull and Fluke, 1950
- C. shannoni (Curran, 1923)
- C. sibirica (Becker, 1894)
- C. sichotana (Stackelberg, 1930)
- C. siciliana Becker, 1894
- C. signaticornis (Becker, 1894)
- C. signatiseta Hunter, 1897
- C. sini Barkalov & Cheng, 1998
- C. sonoriana (Shannon, 1922)
- C. sootryeni Nielsen, 1970
- C. soror (Zetterstedt, 1843)
- C. sororcula (Williston, 1891)
- C. speculum Hull and Fluke, 1950
- C. stackelbergiana Barkalov, 2003
- C. stackelbergi Barkalov & Peck, 1994
- C. subalbipila (Violovitsh, 1956)
- C. subchalybea (Curran, 1923)
- C. submodesta (Becker, 1922)
- C. subpictipennis Claussen, 1998
- C. sulcifrons Kaplan, 1981
- C. suspecta Barkalov & Cheng, 1998
- C. swannanoa Brimley, 1925
- C. tantalus Hull and Fluke, 1950
- C. thalassica Peck, 1971
- C. tokushimaensis Shiraki, 1968
- C. tonsa (Sack, 1938)
- C. transcaucasica Stackelberg, 1960
- C. tristis Loew, 1863
- C. tyanshanica Barkalov & Peck, 1994
- C. umbrisquama (Becker, 1894)
- C. urakawensis (Shiraki, 1930)
- C. urbana (Meigen, 1822)
- C. ussuriana Barkalov, 1980
- C. uviformis (Becker, 1894)
- C. vangaveri (Timon-David, 1937)
- C. variabilis (Panzer, 1798)
- C. varnensis Claussen, 2000
- C. velutina Loew, 1840
- C. venosa Loew, 1857
- C. vernalis (Fallén, 1817)
- C. versicolor Curran, 1929
- C. vicina (Zetterstedt, 1849)
- C. victoria (Hervé-Bazin, 1930)
- C. violaceozonata Palma, 1863
- C. violovitshi Barkalov, 1979
- C. vtorovi Peck, 1969
- C. vujici Claussen & Doczkal, 1998
- C. vulpina (Meigen, 1822)
- C. wisconsinensis Fluke and Hull, 1947
- C. xantella Barkalov & Peck, 1997
- C. yesonica Matsumura, 1905
- C. yukonensis (Shannon, 1922)
- C. zinchenkoi Barkalov, 2003
- C. zinovievi Stackelberg, 1963
- C. zlotini Peck, 1969
- C. zmilampis Violovitsh, 1975
