= Cheilosia shannoni =

Scientific classification
- Kingdom: Animalia
- Phylum: Arthropoda
- Clade: Pancrustacea
- Class: Insecta
- Order: Diptera
- Family: Syrphidae
- Genus: Cheilosia
- Species: C. shannoni

Binomial name
- Cheilosia shannoni (Curran, 1923)

Synonyms
- Cartosyrphus shannoni Curran, 1923; Chilosia similis Shannon, 1916

Species of fly

Cheilosia shannoni is a species of syrphid fly in the family Syrphidae.
