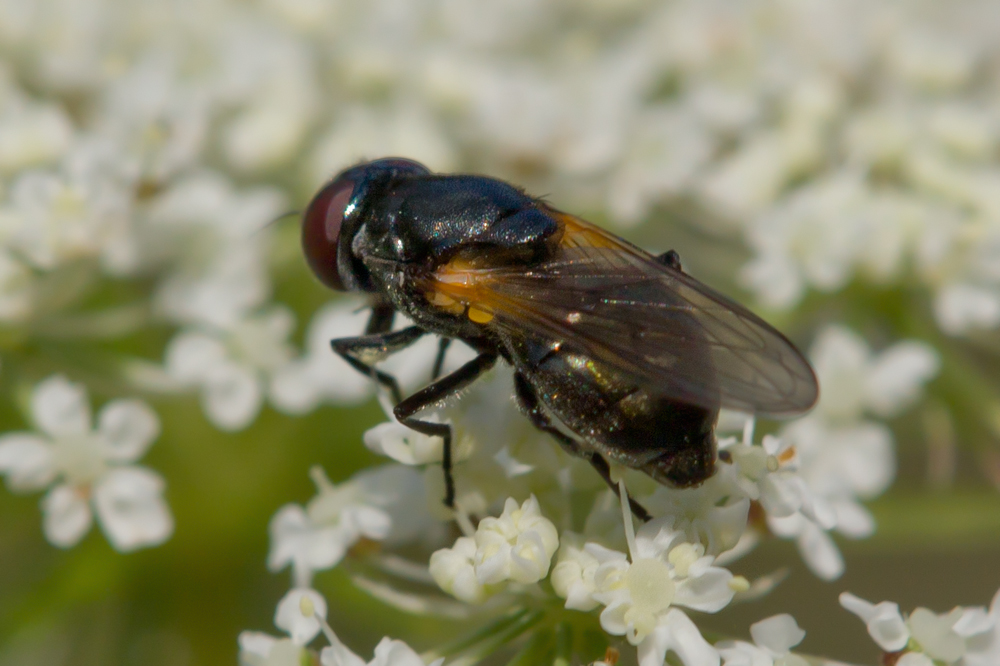
- Female

Scientific classification
- Kingdom: Animalia
- Phylum: Arthropoda
- Clade: Pancrustacea
- Class: Insecta
- Order: Diptera
- Family: Syrphidae
- Genus: Cheilosia
- Species: C. impressa

Binomial name
- Cheilosia impressa Loew, 1840

= Cheilosia impressa =

Species of fly

Cheilosia impressa is a Palearctic species of hoverfly. Like most members of its genus C. impressa is a rather small, dark insect and identification can be problematic.

== Description ==
For terms see Morphology of Diptera

Wing length 5·75–8 mm. A broadly built species. Thorax coarsely punctate, shining, undusted. Legs black Wing base yellow. Coxa 1 with a hornlike projection at the base of the outer side. Facial knob rounded. Part of the impressa species group. The larva is figured by Schmid (1999)

== Distribution ==
Present in most of Europe and in the eastern Palearctic realm. East to Siberia.

== Biology ==
Habitat: Deciduous forest, wetland, open areas in deciduous forest, montane, unimproved grassland, grassland up to above 2,000m in the alpine zone, fen. Flowers visited include white Umbelliferae, Compositae. Cirsium, Euphorbia, Filipendula, Geranium, Mentha, Prunus, Ranunculus, Rubus. Flight period is May to July and August to September.
