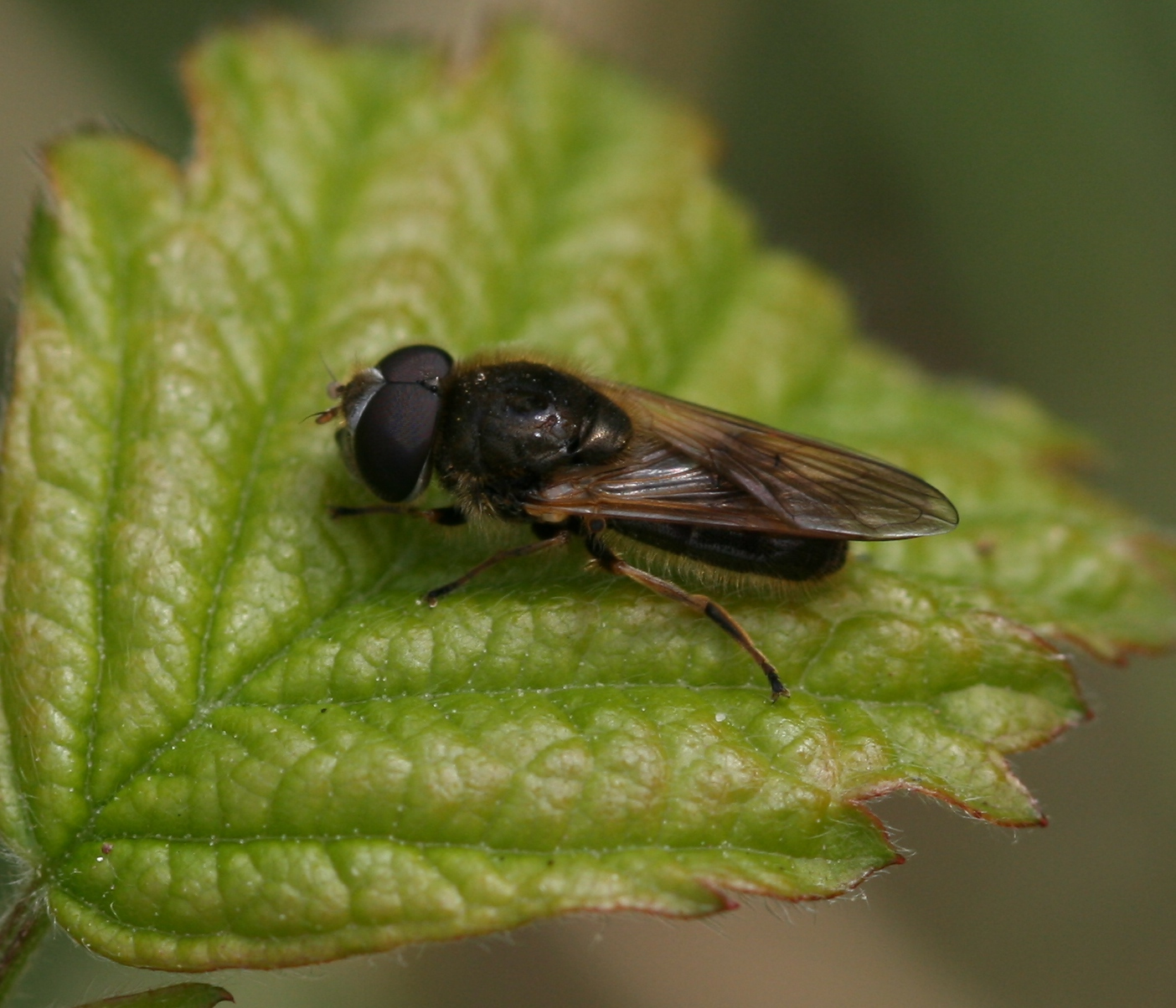
- Cheilosia nebulosa male

Scientific classification
- Kingdom: Animalia
- Phylum: Arthropoda
- Clade: Pancrustacea
- Class: Insecta
- Order: Diptera
- Family: Syrphidae
- Genus: Cheilosia
- Species: C. nebulosa

Binomial name
- Cheilosia nebulosa Verrall, 1871

= Cheilosia nebulosa =

Species of fly

Cheilosia nebulosa is a Palearctic species of hoverfly.

== Description ==
External images For terms see Morphology of Diptera
Wing length 6-8·5 mm. Face with conspicuous central knob. Legs partly yellow or orange. Scutellum without margin bristles. Wing with central cross veins darkened and with dusky clouds on anterior part. Antennae with third segment rounded and pale with dark tip.

== Distribution ==
Present in most of Europe and the western Palearctic realm east to the Urals.

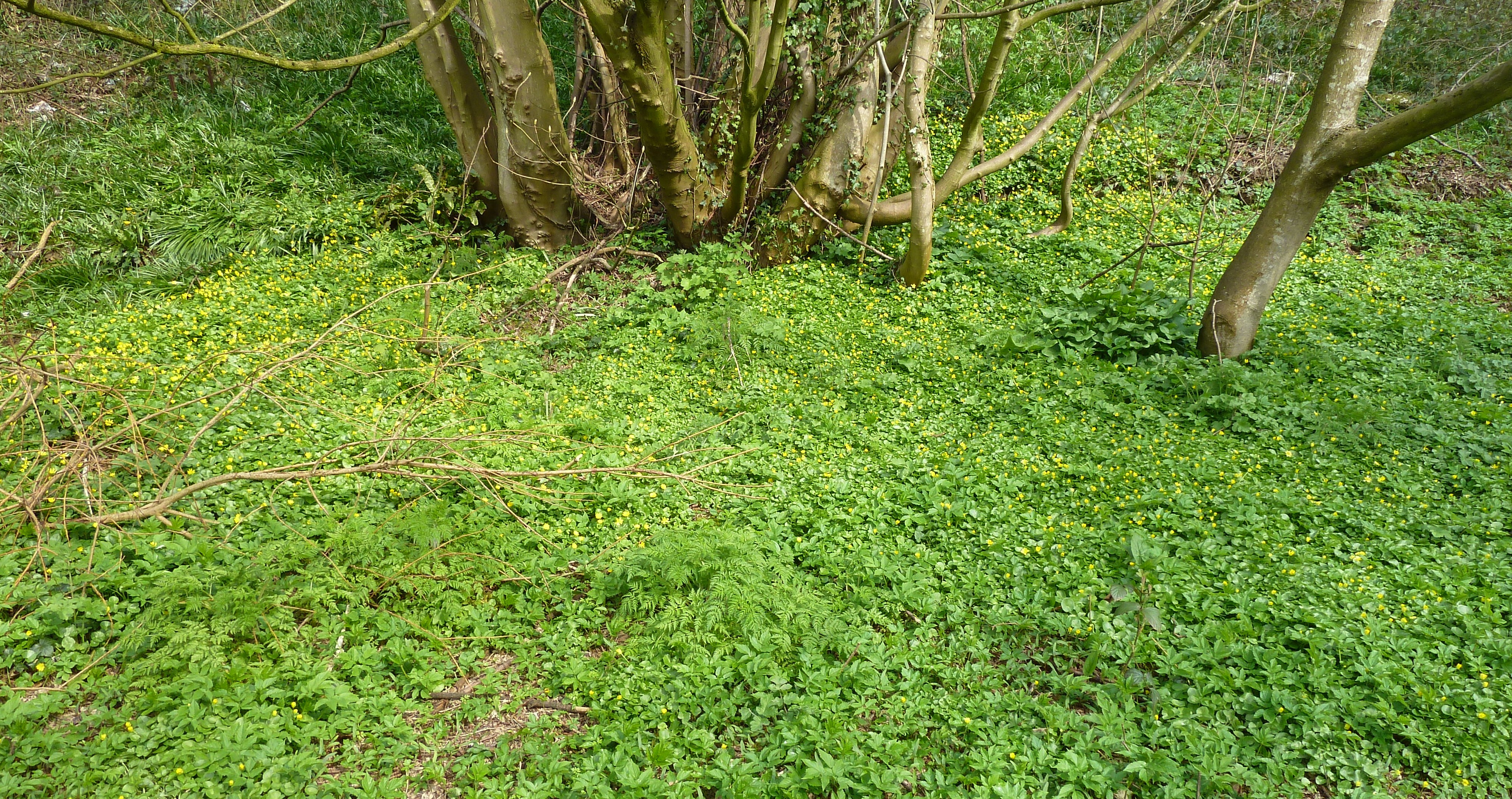
Habitat.Ireland.

== Biology ==
Habitat Wetlands, woodlands, Alnus and Salix carr and poorly drained scrub (Prunus spinosa). Flowers visited include Crataegus, Prunus, Salix, Taraxacum and Tussilago. Flies from the end of April to beginning June (later at higher altitudes).
