= Cheilosia pallipes =

Conservation status
- Unranked (NatureServe)

Scientific classification
- Kingdom: Animalia
- Phylum: Arthropoda
- Clade: Pancrustacea
- Class: Insecta
- Order: Diptera
- Family: Syrphidae
- Genus: Cheilosia
- Species: C. pallipes

Binomial name
- Cheilosia pallipes Loew 1863

Synonyms
- Cheilosia flavoscutellata (Shiraki, 1968); Chilosia flavissima (Becker, 1894); Chilosia pallipes (Loew, 1863)

Species of insect

Cheilosia pallipes, the yellow-shouldered blacklet, is a common species of syrphid fly observed in eastern North America. Hoverflies can remain nearly motionless in flight. The adults are also known as flower flies for they are commonly found on flowers from which they get both energy-giving nectar and protein rich pollen. Larvae, when known, are plant feeders.
