= Cheilosia caltha =

Scientific classification
- Kingdom: Animalia
- Phylum: Arthropoda
- Clade: Pancrustacea
- Class: Insecta
- Order: Diptera
- Family: Syrphidae
- Genus: Cheilosia
- Species: C. caltha

Binomial name
- Cheilosia caltha (Shannon, 1922)

Synonyms
- Cartosyrphus caltha Shannon, 1922

Species of insect

Cheilosia caltha, the prairie blacklet, is a fairly common species of syrphid fly observed across North America. Hoverflies can remain nearly motionless in flight. The adults are also known as flower flies for they are commonly found on flowers from which they get both energy-giving nectar and protein rich pollen. Larvae, when known, are plant feeders.
