= Cheilosia rita =

Scientific classification
- Kingdom: Animalia
- Phylum: Arthropoda
- Clade: Pancrustacea
- Class: Insecta
- Order: Diptera
- Family: Syrphidae
- Genus: Cheilosia
- Species: C. rita

Binomial name
- Cheilosia rita Curran, 1922

Synonyms
- Cartosyrphus sialia (Shannon, 1922); Cheilosia argentipila (Fluke and Hull, 1947); Chilosia rita (Curran, 1922); Cheilosia alpinensis (Fluke & Hull, 1947); Cheilosia argentipila (Fluke & Hull, 1947)

Species of fly

Cheilosia rita the inky blacklet, is a fairly common species of syrphid fly observed in The United States and Canada. Hoverflies can remain nearly motionless in flight. The adults are also known as flower flies for they are commonly found on flowers, from which they get both energy-giving nectar and protein-rich pollen. The larvae, when they are known, are plant feeders.
