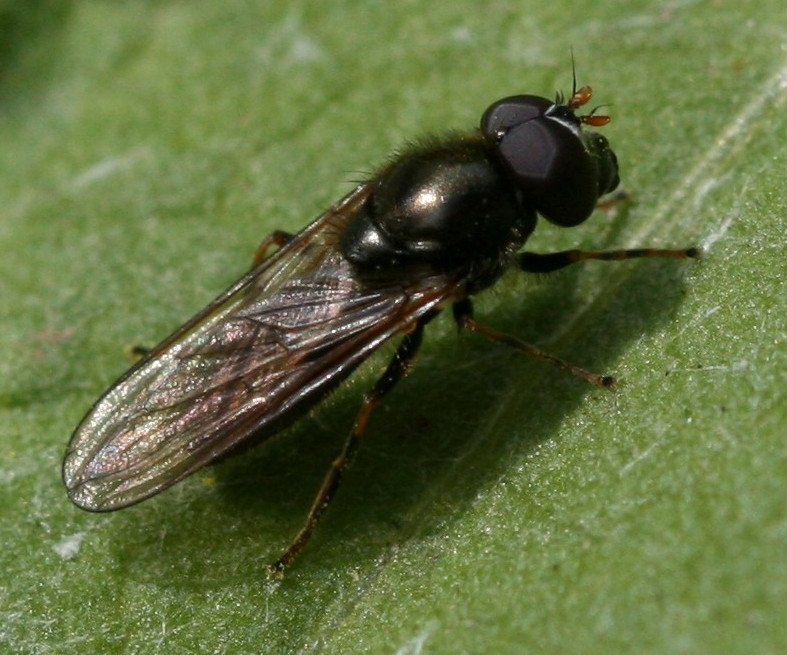
- Male
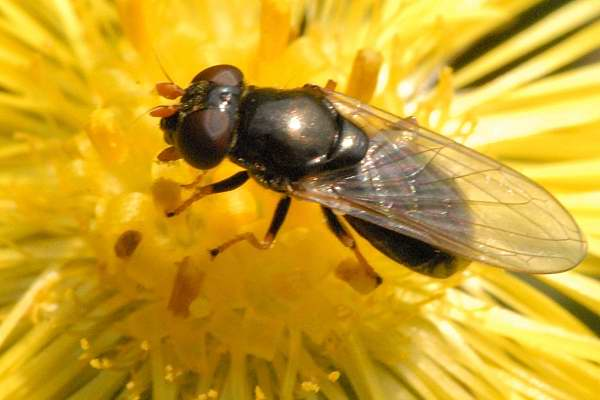
- Female

Scientific classification
- Kingdom: Animalia
- Phylum: Arthropoda
- Clade: Pancrustacea
- Class: Insecta
- Order: Diptera
- Family: Syrphidae
- Genus: Cheilosia
- Species: C. pagana

Binomial name
- Cheilosia pagana (Meigen, 1822)

Synonyms
- Cheilosia floccosa (Verrall, 1901); Cheilosia means Walker, 1851; Cheilosia pulchripes Loew, 1857; Chilosia floccosa Verrall, 1901; Syrphus paganus Meigen, 1822

= Cheilosia pagana =

Species of fly

Cheilosia pagana is a Holarctic species of hoverfly. Like most Cheilosia it is black, and because of this may often be overlooked as a hoverfly. One identifying feature is a large red to orange 3rd antennal segment.

== Description ==
For terms see Morphology of Diptera

Wing length 4.75-8·5 mm. Antennae with third segment clear orange and very large:no furrow. Frons flat in male. Thoracic pubescence variable. Female scutellum entirely black. Legs part yellow. Tarsi 1 with pale central segments pale. Part of the pagana species group.

== Distribution ==
Present in most of Europe and in the eastern Palearctic realm. East to Siberia. Nearctic

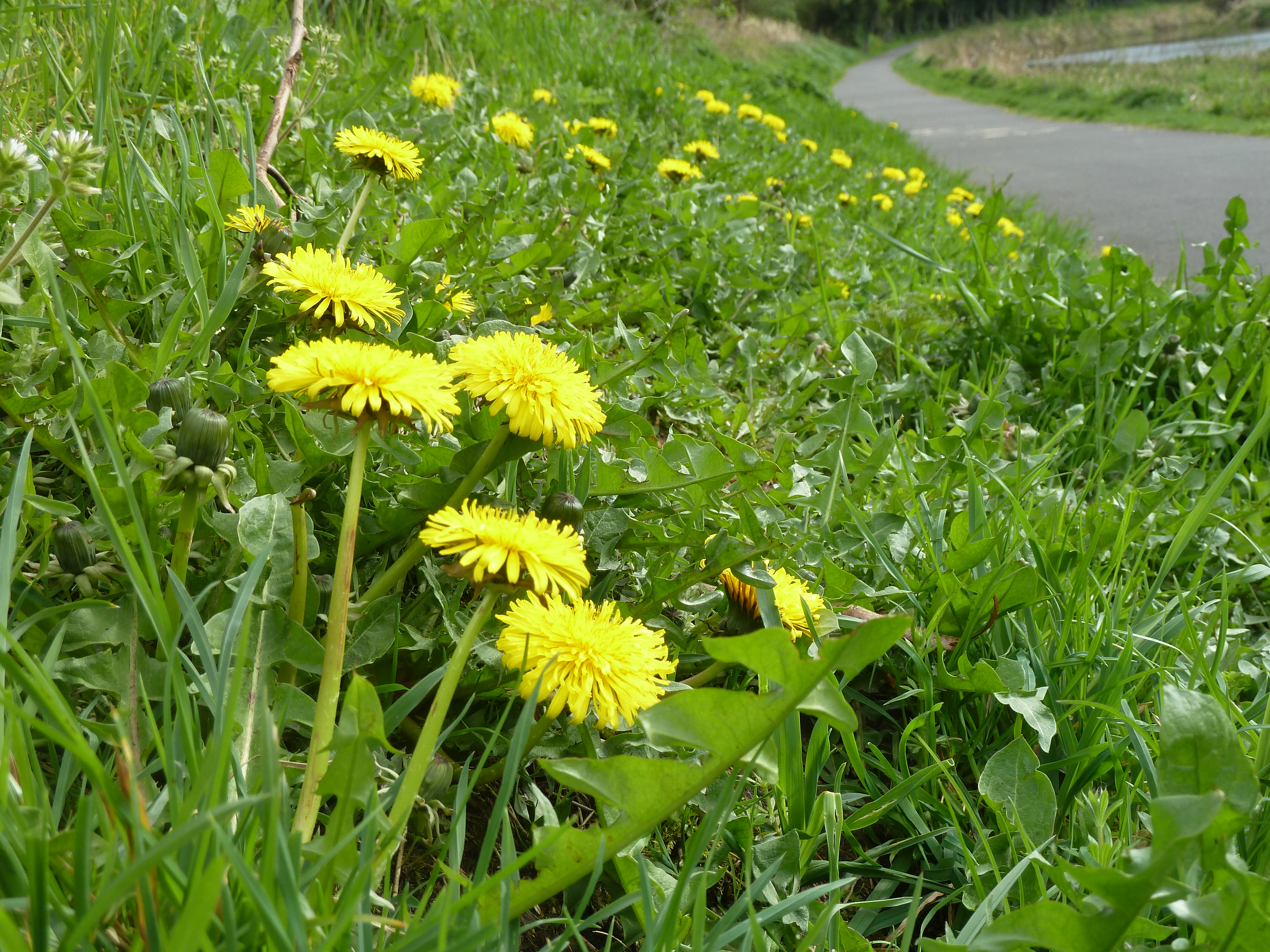
Riverside habitat.Ireland.

== Biology ==
Habitat: coniferous and deciduous woodland, unimproved grassland, along hedgerows in farmland and at roadsides. Scrub and carr. Flowers visited include yellow composites, Ranunculaceae, white umbellifers, Allium ursinum, Anemone nemorosa, Fragaria, Potentilla erecta, Primula, Prunus spinosa and Salix. Flight period is from May to September. In southern Europe, on the wing from mid March. Larvae are known to inhabit semi-liquid, decaying tissue of the roots of plants. There is a rearing record from decaying roots of Cow Parsley.
