= Cheilosia bardus =

Scientific classification
- Kingdom: Animalia
- Phylum: Arthropoda
- Clade: Pancrustacea
- Class: Insecta
- Order: Diptera
- Family: Syrphidae
- Subfamily: Eristalinae
- Tribe: Rhingiini
- Subtribe: Cheilosiina
- Genus: Cheilosia
- Species: C. bardus

Binomial name
- Cheilosia bardus (Harris, 1780)

Synonyms
- Musca bardus Harris, 1780; Syrphus albitarsis Meigen, 1822; Cheilosia flavimana Meigen, 1838; Eristalis innupta Zetterstedt, 184; Chilosia hiawatha Shannon, 1922

Species of fly

Cheilosia bardus is a species of hoverfly belonging to the family Syrphidae.

== Distribution ==
United States:Vermont, Maine Canada: Ontario, New Brunswick, Nova Scotia, Quebec Western Palaearctic region
