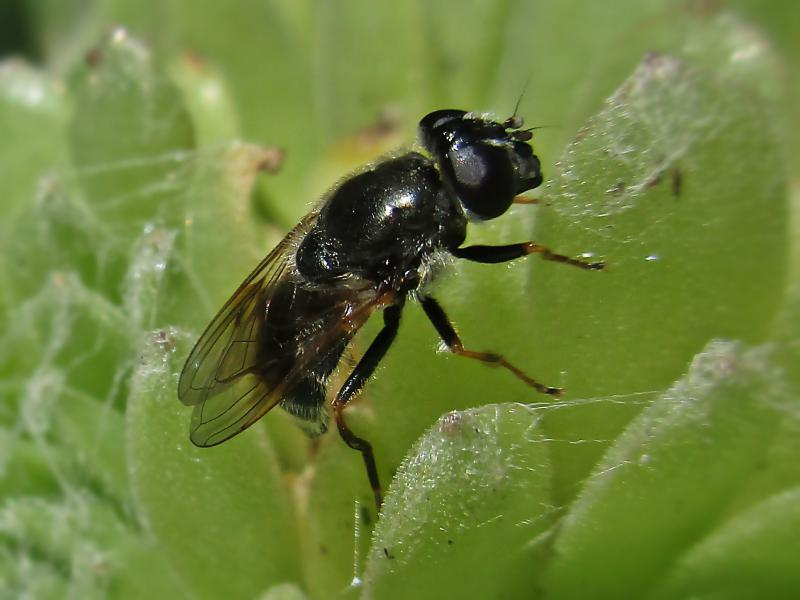
- Cheilosia caerulescens female, Arnhem, the Netherlands

Scientific classification
- Kingdom: Animalia
- Phylum: Arthropoda
- Clade: Pancrustacea
- Class: Insecta
- Order: Diptera
- Family: Syrphidae
- Genus: Cheilosia
- Species: C. caerulescens

Binomial name
- Cheilosia caerulescens (Meigen, 1822)

= Cheilosia caerulescens =

Species of fly

Cheilosia caerulescens is a Palearctic hoverfly.

== Description ==
A bluish-grey Cheilosia with dark legs and, sometimes, pale knees There are distinct dark shades, varying in extent over the two cross veins of the wings. The lower face is strongly protruding, the third antennal segment is brownish-red .It is bare-eyed.

== Distribution and biology ==
It is found from Britain and the Netherlands south to the Pyrenees and France east through Central Europe to European Russia and southeast to Yugoslavia and Roumania. The habitat is subalpine grassland and heath to above 2000m. where it flies from April to September, with peaks in May and August. The larvae feed internally on Sempervivum
