= Cheilosia sahlbergi =

Scientific classification
- Kingdom: Animalia
- Phylum: Arthropoda
- Clade: Pancrustacea
- Class: Insecta
- Order: Diptera
- Family: Syrphidae
- Genus: Cheilosia
- Species: C. sahlbergi

Binomial name
- Cheilosia sahlbergi Becker, 1894

Species of fly

Cheilosia sahlbergi is a Palearctic hoverfly.

== Description ==
One of the Cheilosia species with bare eyes, black legs and fused antennal pits. For identification see references.

== Distribution and biology ==
From Fennoscandia south through mountainous parts of Europe to the Alps, the Balkans and the Caucasus and from Britain (Scottish Highlands) eastwards through Northern Europe to the Baltic states and on to the Kola Peninsula The habitat is near streams and base-rich flushes in moorland, montane heath, and non-calcareous subalpine grassland. Flowers visited include Caltha palustris, Potentilla erecta, Ranunculus, Saxifraga.Flies from April to May at lower altitudes and June to July in the alpine zone. The larva has been seen feeding on Polygonum viviparum L.
