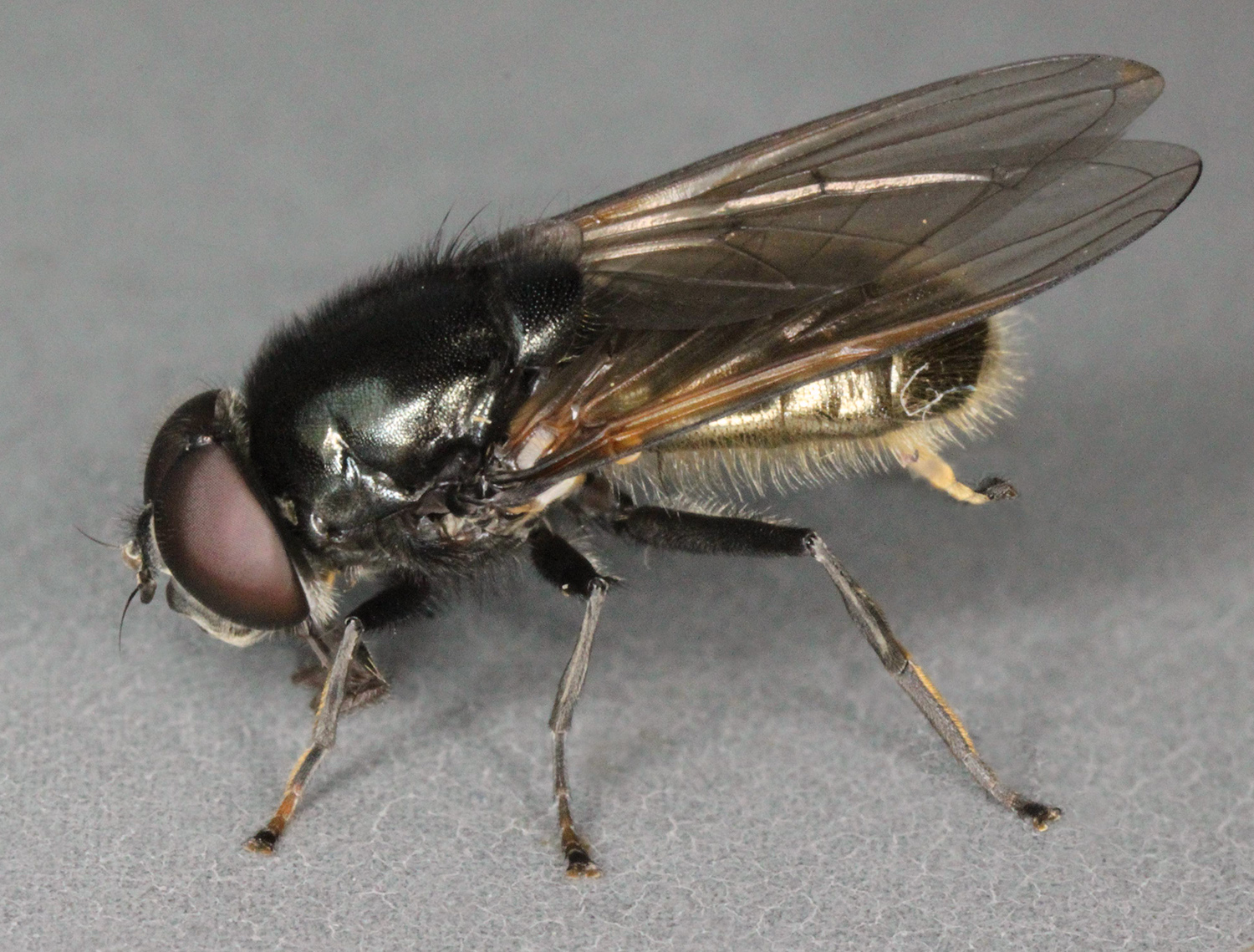
- Cheilosia albitarsis (male)

Scientific classification
- Kingdom: Animalia
- Phylum: Arthropoda
- Clade: Pancrustacea
- Class: Insecta
- Order: Diptera
- Family: Syrphidae
- Genus: Cheilosia
- Species: C. albitarsis

Binomial name
- Cheilosia albitarsis (Meigen, 1822)

Synonyms
- Syrphus albitarsis Meigen, 1822; Syrphus vidua Meigen, 1822; Cheilosia flavimana Meigen, 1838; Musca bardus Harris, 1780

= Cheilosia albitarsis =

Species of fly

Cheilosia albitarsis is an abundant European species of hoverfly. Adults can be found in spring visiting buttercup flowers and this plant is also the larval hostplant.

== Description ==
A large, broadly-built Cheilosia (wing length 7-9·5 mm.) Male: thorax dorsum black-haired. Tarsae 1 tarsomere 5 square. Antero-lateral black hairs on tergite 2. Female: tarsae 1 middle tarsomeres pale. Mouth margin not protruding downwards. Arista of hair length equal to diameter of arista. See references for determination The larva is illustrated by Rotheray (1993).

== Distribution ==
Throughout the Palearctic.

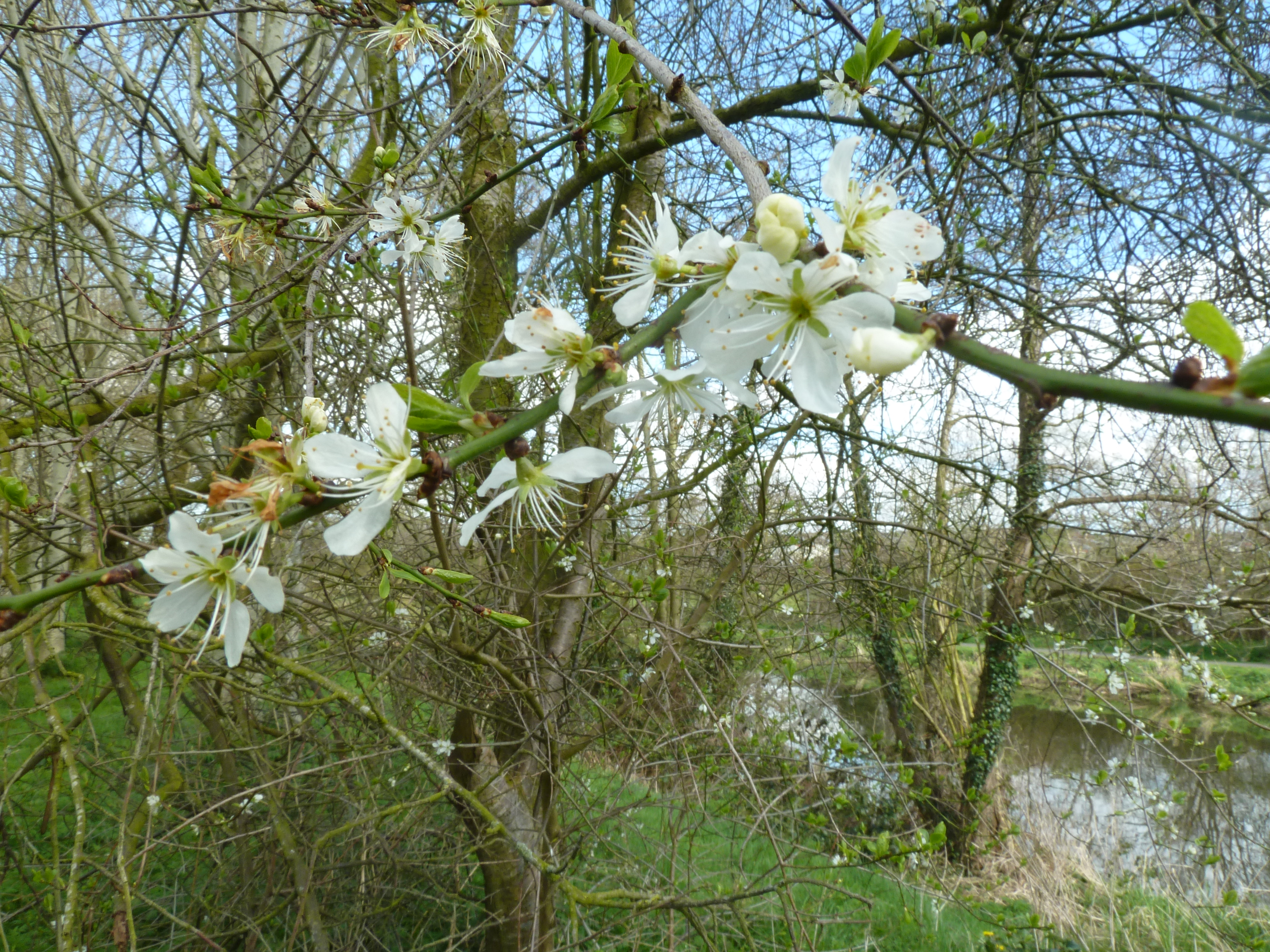
Habitat.Ireland

== Biology ==
The habitat is woodland and forest clearings, agricultural land and forest clearings. Also montane and subalpine pasture. Flowers visited include white umbellifers, composites Ajuga, Allium ursinum, Caltha, Crataegus, Matricaria, Potentilla, Prunus spinosa, Ranunculus, Sorbus, Stellaria.The flight period is April to June, and into July at higher altitudes.
