= Cheilosia comosa =

Scientific classification
- Kingdom: Animalia
- Phylum: Arthropoda
- Clade: Pancrustacea
- Class: Insecta
- Order: Diptera
- Family: Syrphidae
- Genus: Cheilosia
- Species: C. comosa

Binomial name
- Cheilosia comosa (Loew 1863)

Synonyms
- Cartosyrphus brevichaeta (Shannon, 1922); Cheilosia laevifrons (Jones, 1907); Chilosia comosa (Loew, 1863); Chilosia laevifrons (Jones, 1907); Chilosia tarda (Snow, 1895); Pachysphyria crassicalx (Enderlein, 1938)

Species of insect

Cheilosia comosa (Loew 1863), the prairie blacklet, is a species of syrphid fly observed across North America. Hoverflies can remain nearly motionless in flight. The adults are also known as flower flies for they are commonly found on flowers from which they get both energy-giving nectar and protein-rich pollen. Larvae when known are plant feeders.
