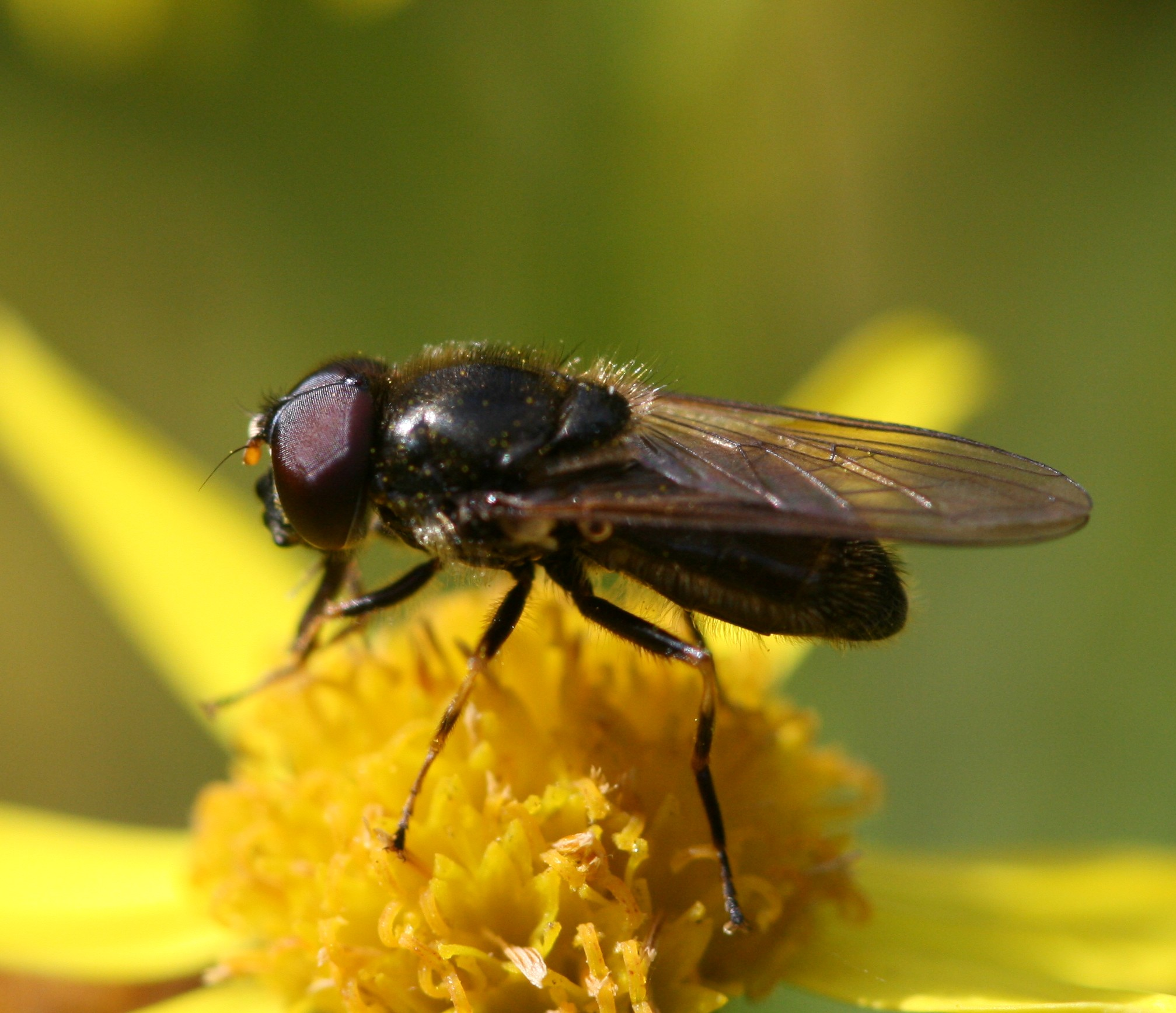
- Cheilosia bergenstammi (male)

Scientific classification
- Kingdom: Animalia
- Phylum: Arthropoda
- Clade: Pancrustacea
- Class: Insecta
- Order: Diptera
- Family: Syrphidae
- Genus: Cheilosia
- Species: C. bergenstammi

Binomial name
- Cheilosia bergenstammi Becker, 1894

= Cheilosia bergenstammi =

Species of fly

Cheilosia bergenstammi is a widespread European species of hoverfly. Adults can be found in summer visiting ragwort flowers and this plant is also the larval hostplant.

== Description ==
External images For terms see Morphology of Diptera
A moderately large (wing length 7·25-9 25 mm.), rather broadly-built brown species (abdomen elongate in males oval in females). Third segment of the antennae entirely reddish. Hind tibia 3 pale with black ring. Part of the Cheilosia bergenstammi species group and difficult to determine. The larva is figured by Smith (1979)

== Distribution ==
Scandinavia South to the Pyrenees and North Spain. Ireland east through central Europe to European Russia.

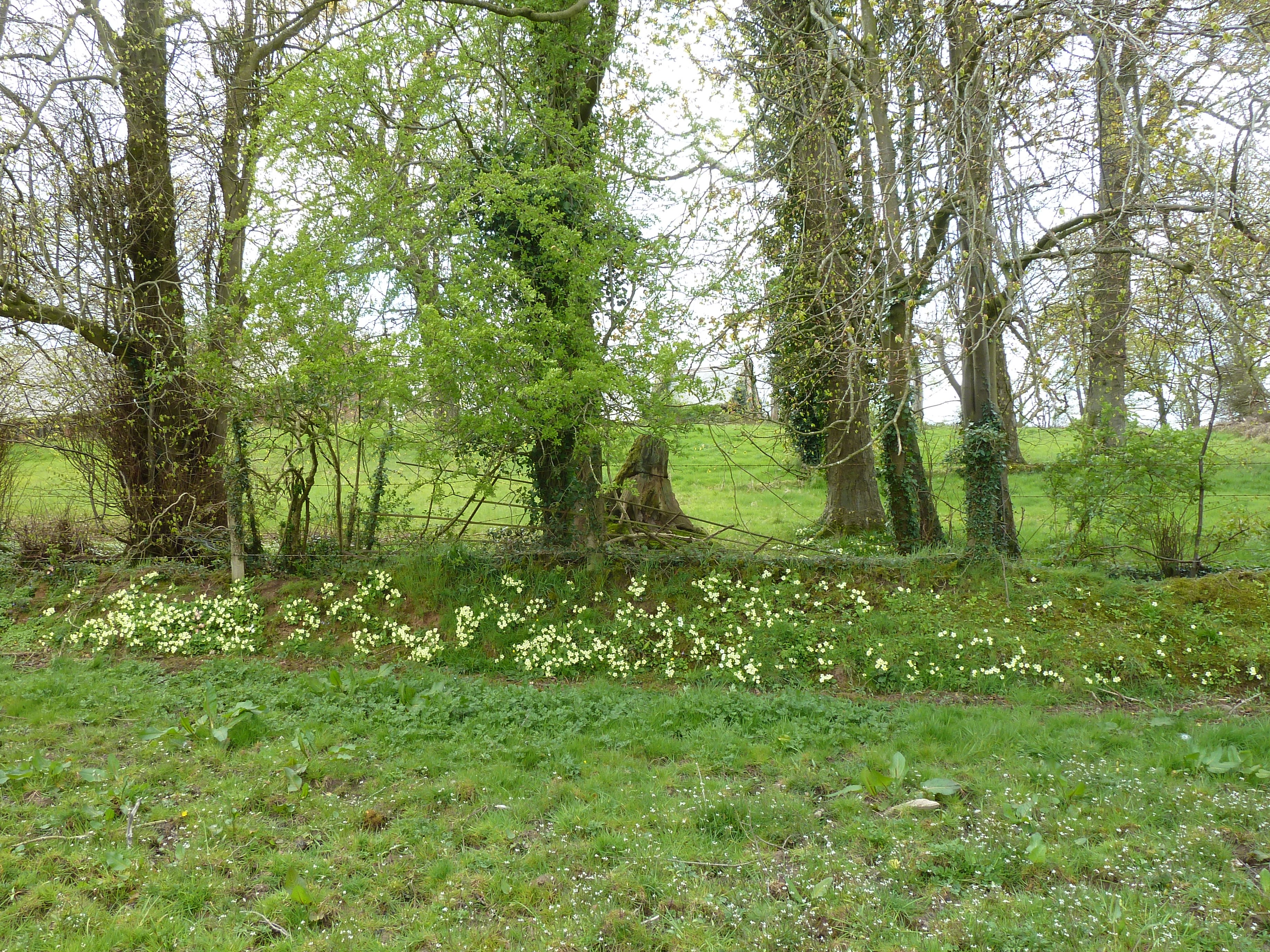
Habitat.Ireland.

== Biology ==
Habitat:open, grassy areas in coniferous and deciduous forest, eutrophic dune grassland; unimproved alpine pasture (the normal larval food-plant of Senecio jacobaea, is systematically removed from grassland grazed by cows and horses), edges of clearings, tracks and fields. Flowers visited include Allium, Caltha, Geranium, Hieracium, Primula, Ranunculus, Senecio, Taraxacum, umbellifers. The flight period is April to June and middle July to September.
