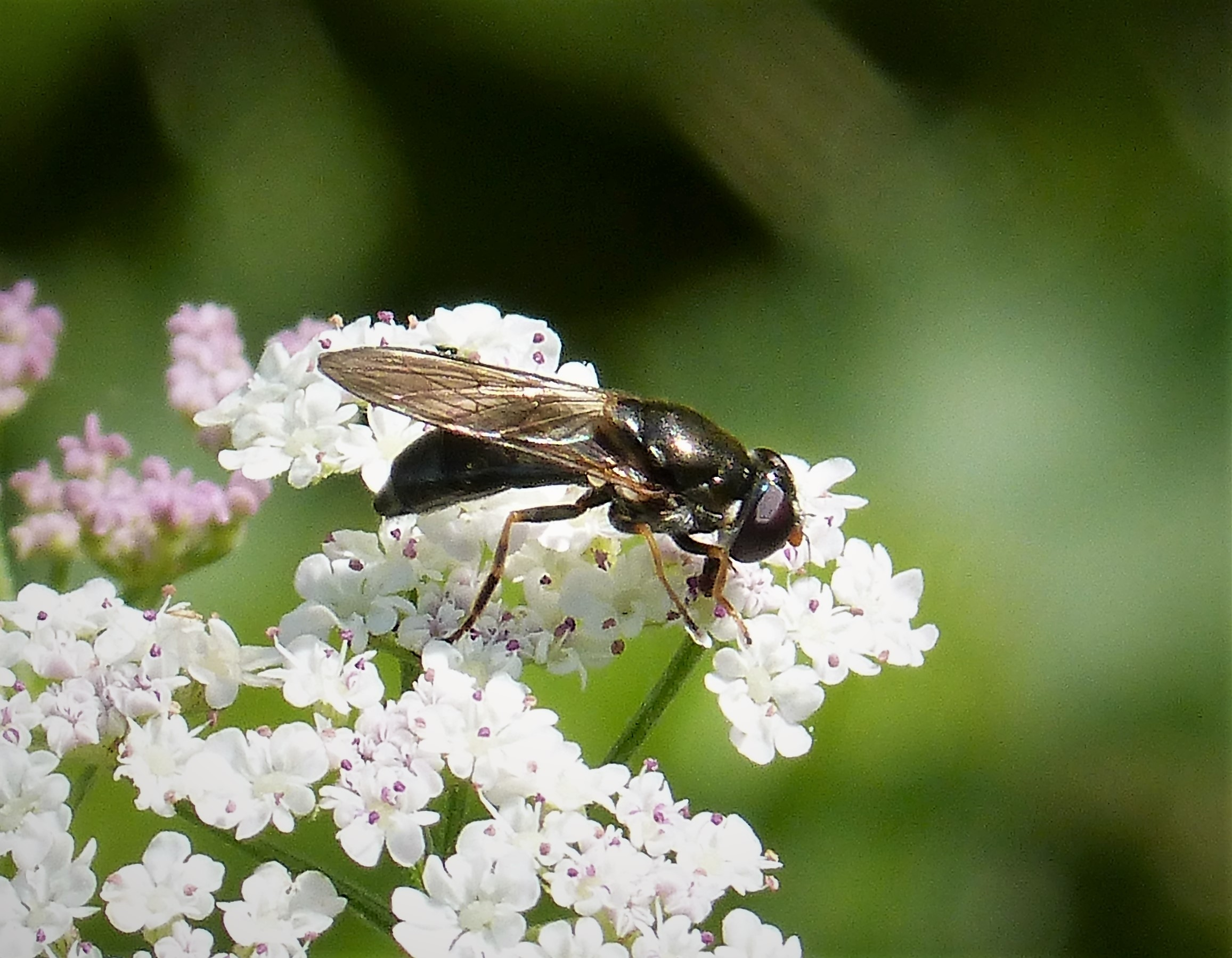
- Cheilosia soror Haugh Wood, England

Scientific classification
- Kingdom: Animalia
- Phylum: Arthropoda
- Clade: Pancrustacea
- Class: Insecta
- Order: Diptera
- Family: Syrphidae
- Genus: Cheilosia
- Species: C. soror

Binomial name
- Cheilosia soror (Zetterstedt, 1843)

Synonyms
- Cheilosia ruffipes (Preyssler)

= Cheilosia soror =

Species of fly

Cheilosia soror is a Palearctic hoverfly.

== Description ==
One of the Cheilosia species with bare eyes, long wings, partially pale legs and fused antennal pits. For identification see references.

== Distribution and biology ==
From Fennoscandia south to North Africa from England eastwards through Europe into Central Asia, Siberia, the Russian Far East and Japan. The habitat Fagus and Quercus (including Quercus suber) old forest and alluvial softwood forest of Salix and Populus. Flowers visited include white umbellifers, Cirsium, Taraxacum. Flies from May to September. The undescribed larva feeds on Basidiomycota.
