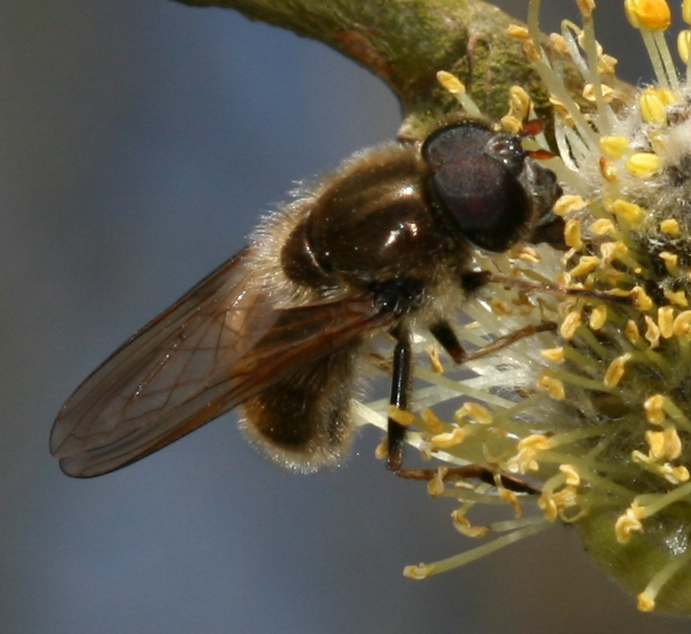
- Cheilosia albipila male

Scientific classification
- Kingdom: Animalia
- Phylum: Arthropoda
- Clade: Pancrustacea
- Class: Insecta
- Order: Diptera
- Family: Syrphidae
- Genus: Cheilosia
- Species: C. albipila

Binomial name
- Cheilosia albipila Meigen, 1838

Synonyms
- Cheilosia flavicornis Verrall, 1870; Cheilosia flavipes Walker, 1851; Chilosia flavicornis Verrall, 1870

= Cheilosia albipila =

Species of fly

Cheilosia albipila is a European and Palearctic species of hoverfly. Like most Cheilosia it is black, and because of this may often be overlooked as a hoverfly. It is little recorded but probably widespread and common and maybe overlooked because adult flight periods are early in the year, before many hoverfly recorders are active.

== Description ==
External images.Wing length 8·75–10·75 mm. The wings are unclouded. The entire pubescence is long and reddish. The tergites have a purple sheen. The antennae are clear orange, the tip sometimes slightly darkened. The face of the male with the central prominence sometimes peculiarly depressed at middle. Female has yellow femora and tarsi. The larva is illustrated by Rotheray (1993)

== Distribution ==
It is distributed from Scandinavia to south of the Pyrenees, and from Ireland eastwards through much of northern and central Europe and European parts of Russia and central Siberia.

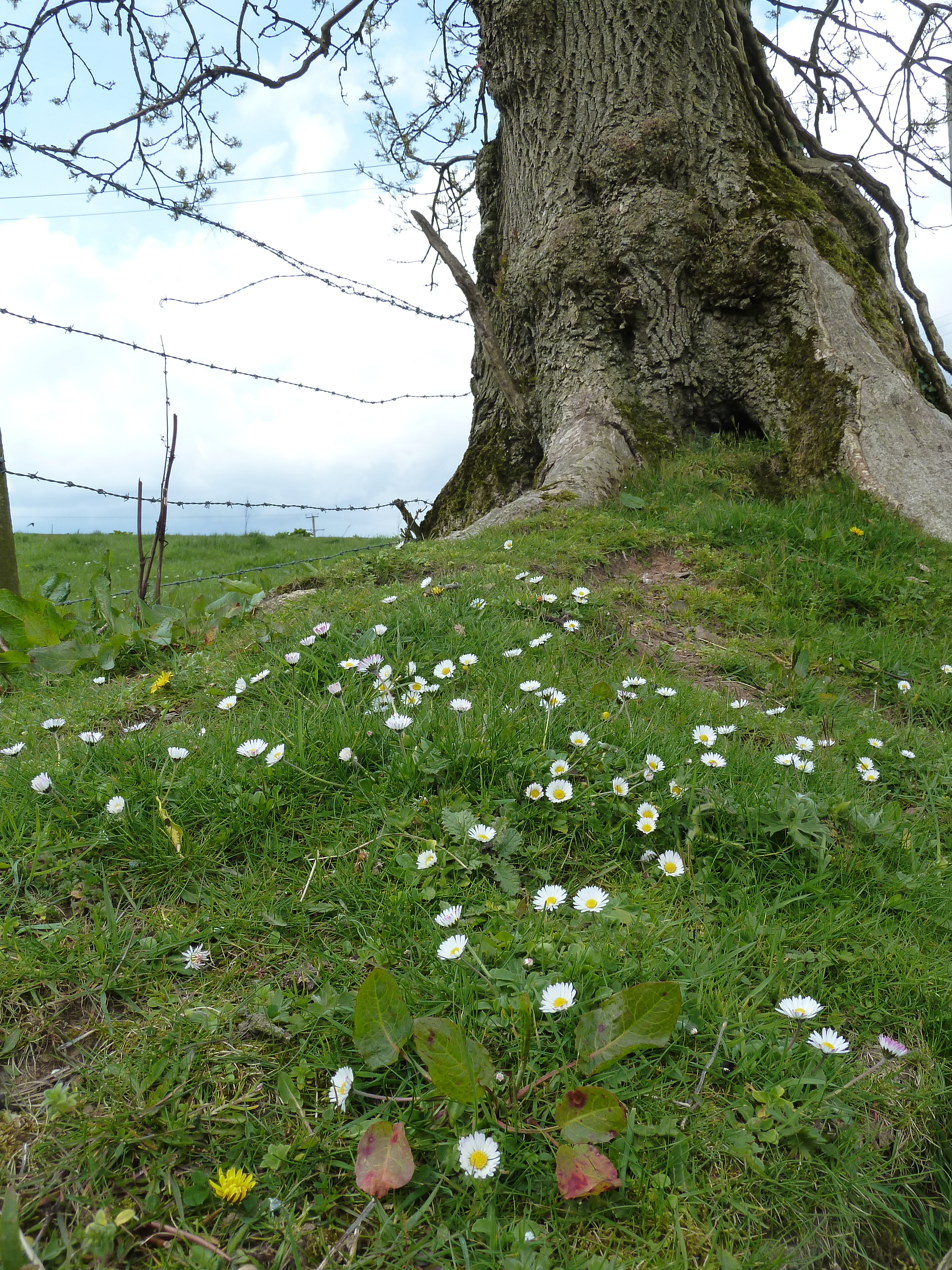
Habitat.Ireland

== Biology ==
Habitat tracks and clearings in forest and at the edge of woodland and tracks through carr. The larvae of C. albipila feed inside the base of the stems of Marsh Thistles (Cirsium palustre) Adult Females lay eggs in the rosettes of mature plants in early spring when adults are most active. Usually there is only one larvae per plant and they feed by tunnelling up the pithy centre of the main thistles stem. The larvae mature about mid to late June in southern UK and then leave the plant to pupate in the soil around the thistle. Flight times of adults are Late February to May, peeking around mid April. Adults feed on Bellis, Betula, Caltha, Cardamine, Corylus, Prunus spinosa, Ribes uvacrispa, Salix, Taraxacum, Tussilago and Vaccinium.
