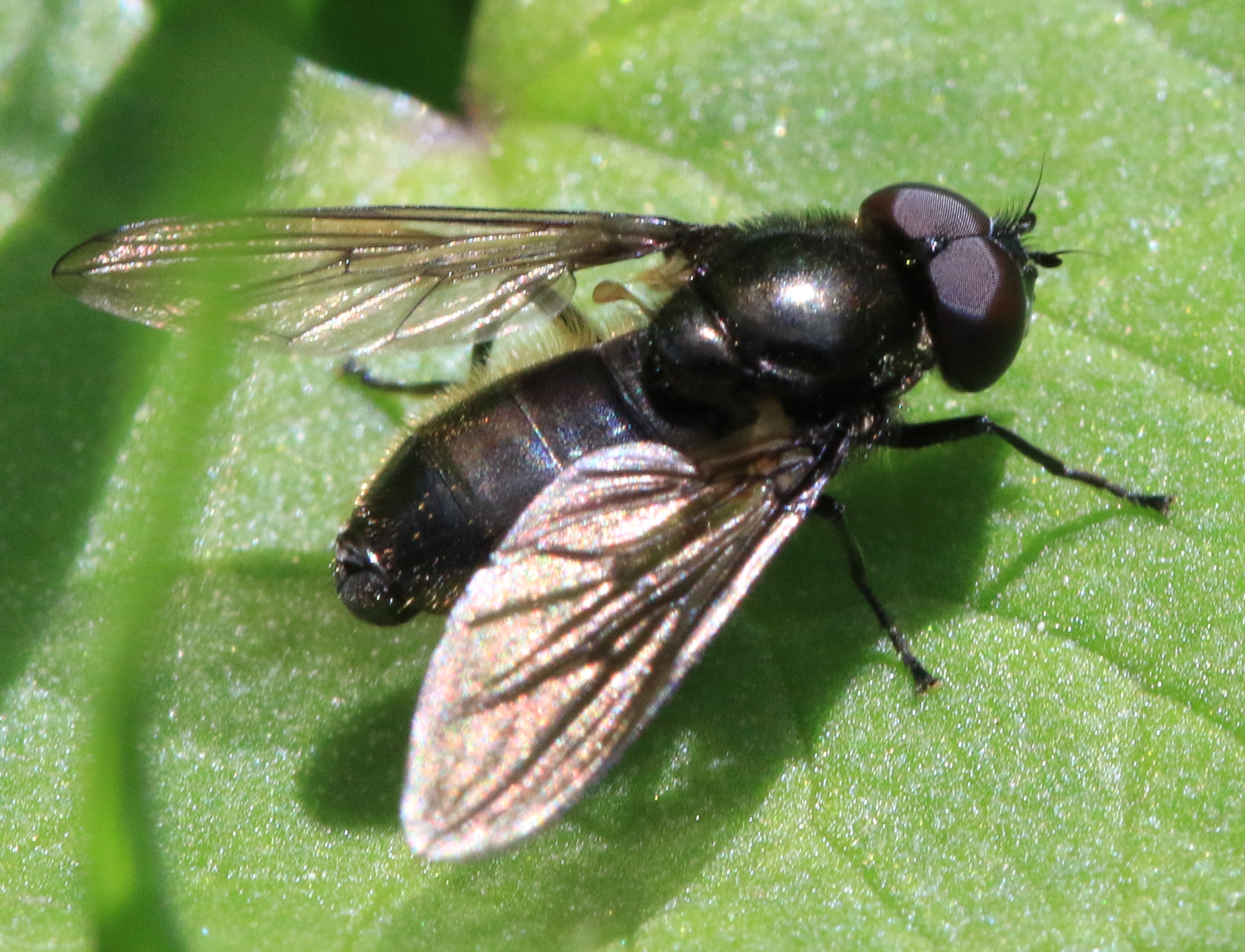
- Crichton Glen, Midlothian, Scotland

Scientific classification
- Kingdom: Animalia
- Phylum: Arthropoda
- Clade: Pancrustacea
- Class: Insecta
- Order: Diptera
- Family: Syrphidae
- Genus: Cheilosia
- Species: C. pubera

Binomial name
- Cheilosia pubera (Zetterstedt, 1838)

= Cheilosia pubera =

Species of fly

Cheilosia pubera is a Palearctic hoverfly.

== Description ==
For terms see Morphology of Diptera
Body 7.0 mm. to 8.0.mm. long. The finely punctured mesonotum is clothed with uniformly long golden brown hairs and the abdomen with uniformly yellowish brown hairs. The wingbases are yellowish brown.

== Distribution ==
Fennoscandia, Ardennes, North Spain and the Alps; from Ireland East through northern and central Europe. Mountains of northern Italy and Yugoslavia into European Russia.

== Habitat ==
Forest wetland, montane pasture and fen carr and beside streams in Fagus and Picea forest.

== Biology ==
Low flying and settling on the foliage of large-leaved plants. Flowers visited include Acer platanoides, Caltha, Cardamine, Prunus padus, Pulsatilla alpina, Ranunculus and Taraxacum. Flies from the end of April to June at lower altitudes, and June to July at higher altitudes and more northerly latitudes.
