= Cheilosia orilliaensis =

Conservation status
- Secure (NatureServe)

Scientific classification
- Kingdom: Animalia
- Phylum: Arthropoda
- Clade: Pancrustacea
- Class: Insecta
- Order: Diptera
- Family: Syrphidae
- Genus: Cheilosia
- Species: C. orilliaensis

Binomial name
- Cheilosia orilliaensis Curran, 1922

Synonyms
- Cheilosia angelica (Telford, 1939); Cheilosia dakota (Hull and Fluke, 1950); Cheilosia minnesotensis (Telford, 1939); Cheilosia nokomis (Hull and Fluke, 1950); Chilosia orilliaenis (Curran, 1922)

Species of insect

Cheilosia orilliaensis, the black-backed blacklet, is a common species of syrphid fly observed across North America. Hoverflies can remain nearly motionless in flight. The adults are also known as flower flies for they are commonly found on flowers, from which they get both energy-giving nectar and protein-rich pollen. Larvae when known are plant feeders.
