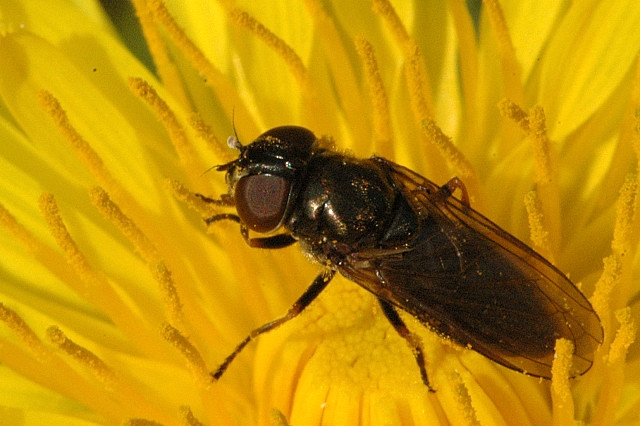
- Cheilosia carbonaria female

Scientific classification
- Kingdom: Animalia
- Phylum: Arthropoda
- Clade: Pancrustacea
- Class: Insecta
- Order: Diptera
- Family: Syrphidae
- Genus: Cheilosia
- Species: C. carbonaria

Binomial name
- Cheilosia carbonaria Egger, 1860

= Cheilosia carbonaria =

Species of fly

Cheilosia carbonaria is a European species of hoverfly. Like most Cheilosia it is black, and because of this may often be overlooked as a hoverfly. It is little recorded, and is considered rare and scarce throughout most of its range.

== Distribution ==
It is distributed from Scandinavia to France, and from the southern part of the UK eastwards through most of central Europe as far south as Greece.
