= Cheilosia capillata =

Scientific classification
- Kingdom: Animalia
- Phylum: Arthropoda
- Clade: Pancrustacea
- Class: Insecta
- Order: Diptera
- Family: Syrphidae
- Genus: Cheilosia
- Species: C. capillata

Binomial name
- Cheilosia capillata Loew, 1863

Synonyms
- Cartosyrphus lamprurus (Bigot, 1884); Chilosia capillata (Loew, 1863)

Species of fly

Cheilosia capillata, the scar-horned blacklet, is an uncommon species of syrphid fly observed in the northeastern United States. Hoverflies can remain nearly motionless in flight. The adults are also known as flower flies for they are commonly found on flowers, from which they get both energy-giving nectar and protein-rich pollen. Larvae when known are plant feeders.
