= Cheilosia ahenea =

Scientific classification
- Kingdom: Animalia
- Phylum: Arthropoda
- Clade: Pancrustacea
- Class: Insecta
- Order: Diptera
- Family: Syrphidae
- Genus: Cheilosia
- Species: C. ahenea

Binomial name
- Cheilosia ahenea (von Roser, 1840)

Synonyms
- Cheilosia laskai Speight, 1978

Species of fly

Cheilosia ahenea is a Palearctic species of hoverfly.

== Description ==
External images For terms see Morphology of Diptera
Black with infuscated wings. Adult males have a shining abdomen, and all-black legs. Thorax with pale hairs of a single length, sternites weakly dusted, scutellar bristles sometimes lacking. Identification by examination of the male genitalia. The male genitalia are figured by Barkalov and Ståhls,(1997).

== Distribution ==
Cheilosia ahenea is a Palearctic species with a limited distribution in Europe - Central Europe, North Spain, Ireland.

== Biology ==
The habitat is grassland including both calcareous and non-calcareous subalpine pasture, in central Europe in the montane zone up to nearly 2000 metres. In Ireland, this species occurs on the coast at sea level, in calcareous grassland. Adult habitat and habits. The insect flies close to the ground and often settles on bare ground or stones. It also hovers. Flowers visited include Ranunculus, Taraxacum, Antennaria, Dryas, and Hieracium The flight period is May to July.
