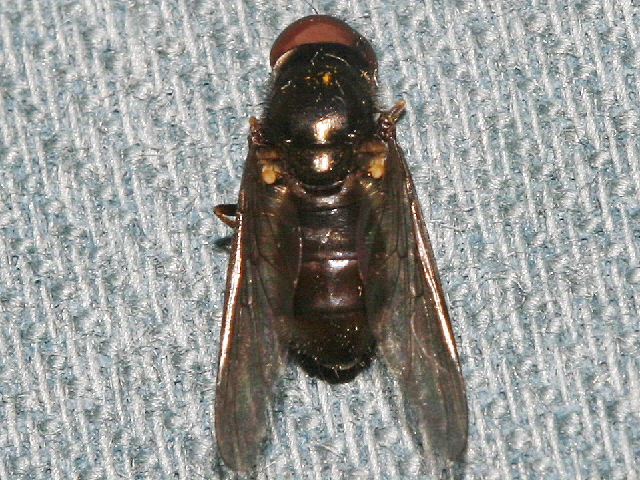

Scientific classification
- Kingdom: Animalia
- Phylum: Arthropoda
- Clade: Pancrustacea
- Class: Insecta
- Order: Diptera
- Family: Syrphidae
- Genus: Cheilosia
- Species: C. latrans

Binomial name
- Cheilosia latrans Walker 1849

Synonyms
- Cartosyrphus longipilosa Wehr, 1922; Chilosia tristis Loew, 1863; Syrphus aesyctes Walker, 1849; Syrphus latrans Walker, 1849

= Cheilosia latrans =

Species of fly

Cheilosia latrans, the steely blacklet, is a very common species of syrphid fly observed in northern North America. Hoverflies can remain nearly motionless in flight. The adults are also known as flower flies for they are commonly found on flowers from which they get nutrient-rich nectar and pollen. Larvae when known are plant feeders.
