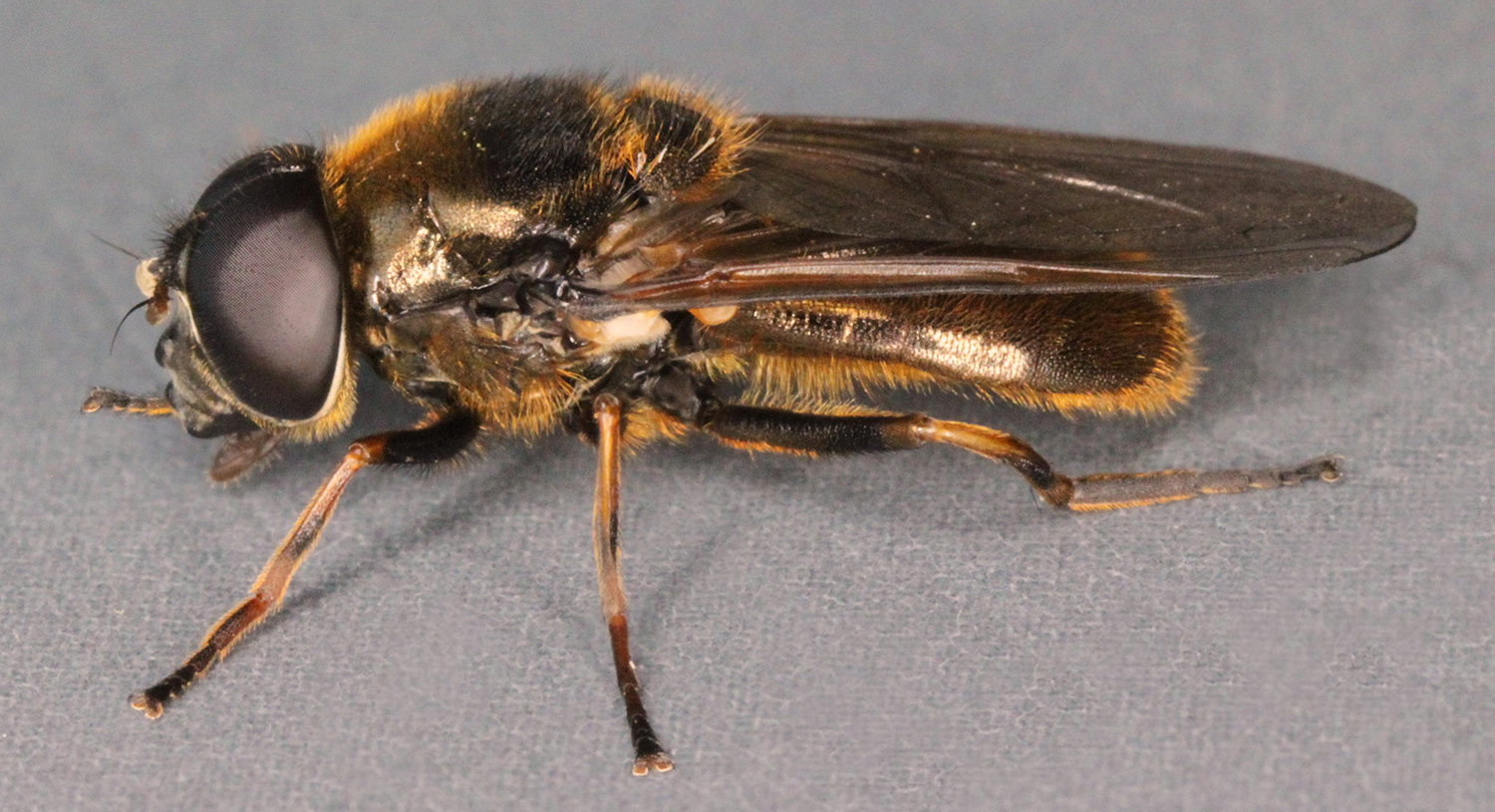
- Cheilosia fraterna, Trawscoed, North Wales

Scientific classification
- Kingdom: Animalia
- Phylum: Arthropoda
- Clade: Pancrustacea
- Class: Insecta
- Order: Diptera
- Family: Syrphidae
- Genus: Cheilosia
- Species: C. fraterna

Binomial name
- Cheilosia fraterna (Meigen, 1830)

Synonyms
- Cheilosia rufitibia Egger, 1860; Eristalis dimidiata Zetterstedt, 1849

= Cheilosia fraterna =

Species of fly

Cheilosia fraterna is a Palearctic hoverfly.

== Description ==
A Cheilosia with dark eye hairs, glossed sternites and a low facial prominence The larva is described and figured by Rotheray (1994).

== Distribution and biology ==
It is found from Fenno-Scandia south to the Pyrenees (montane in southern parts of its range) and from Britain eastwards through Central Europe into European Russia and on into much of Siberia. The habitat is deciduous forest of Quercus and Fagus along streams and rivers. Flowers visited include Caltha, Ranunculus, Stellaria, Taraxacum.Flies from April to June (at higher altitudes July to September. The larva mines Cirsium palustre and species of Carduus.
