= Cheilosia lasiopa =

Scientific classification
- Kingdom: Animalia
- Phylum: Arthropoda
- Clade: Pancrustacea
- Class: Insecta
- Order: Diptera
- Family: Syrphidae
- Genus: Cheilosia
- Species: C. lasiopa

Binomial name
- Cheilosia lasiopa Kowarz, 1885

Species of fly

Cheilosia lasiopa is a Palearctic hoverfly. This species was previously misidentified as Cheilosia honesta (= honesta sensu auct. not or nec Rondani).

== Description ==
A broad, brown 9–10 mm. Cheilosia with dark legs (sometimes pale knees) and short scutellar bristles: arista at most twice as long as antennomere 3.

== Distribution and biology ==
It is found from Fennoscandia south to the Vosges mountains and from Britain eastwards through the mountains of Central Europe into Yugoslavia and European Russia. The habitat is deciduous and conifer forest. Flowers visited include white Umbelliferae Cochlearia, Crataegus, Euphorbia, Fragaria, Menyanthes, Ranunculus, Salix, Stellaria, Taraxacum and Vaccinium. It flies from May to June (April in the South). The larva feeds on Plantago lanceolata.
