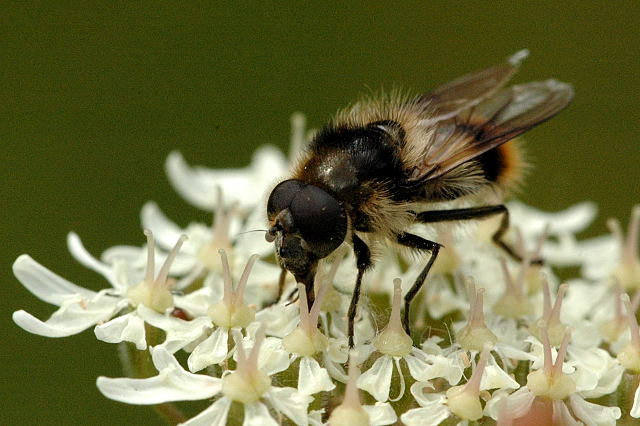
- male
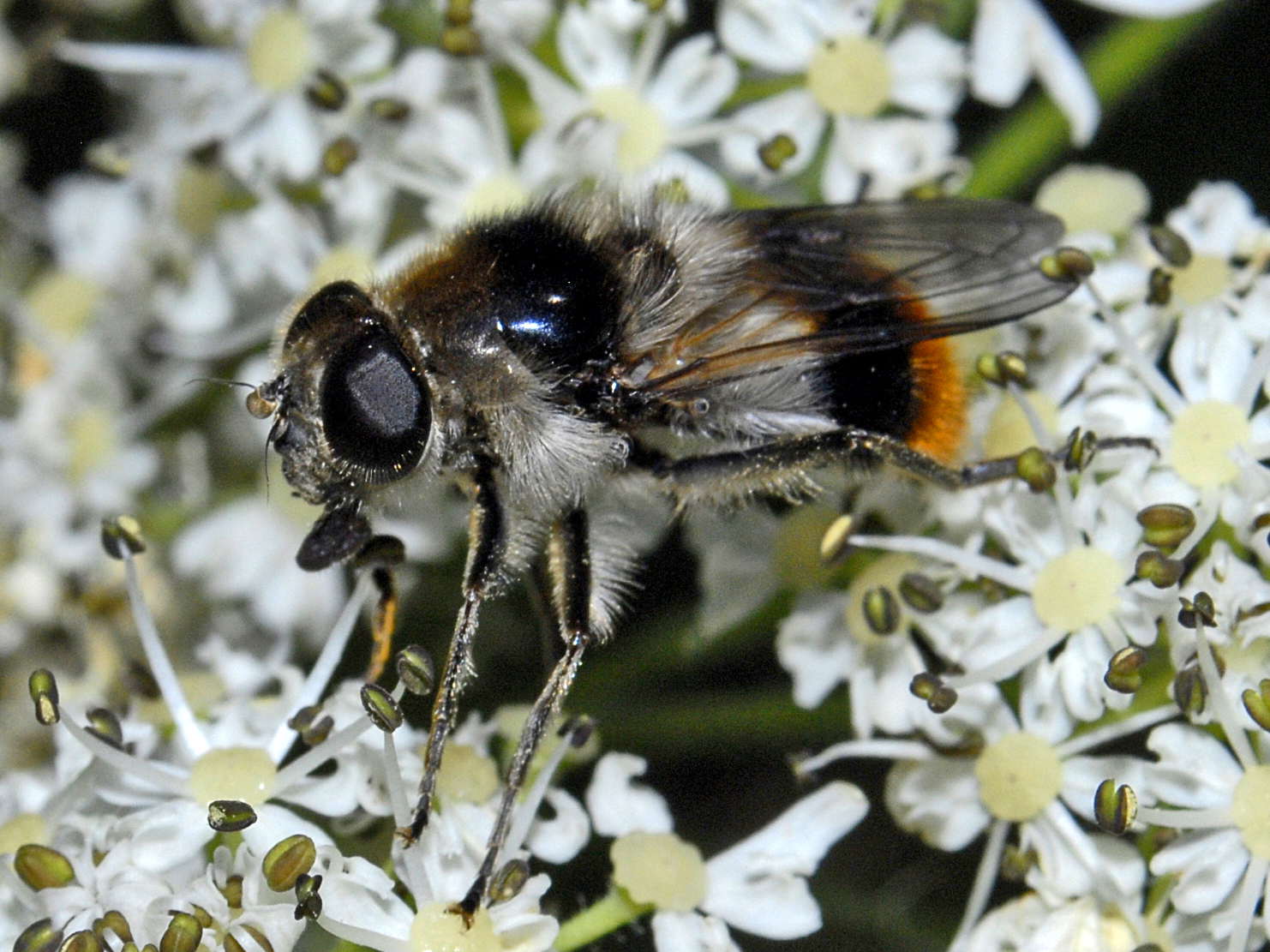
- female

Scientific classification
- Kingdom: Animalia
- Phylum: Arthropoda
- Clade: Pancrustacea
- Class: Insecta
- Order: Diptera
- Family: Syrphidae
- Genus: Cheilosia
- Species: C. illustrata

Binomial name
- Cheilosia illustrata (Harris, 1780)

Synonyms
- Cheilosia intonsa Loew, 1857; Musca illustrata Harris, 1780

= Cheilosia illustrata =

Species of fly

Cheilosia illustrata is a species of hoverfly belonging to the family Syrphidae.

== Distribution ==
This common species is present in most of Europe and in the eastern Palearctic realm. East to Siberia.

== Habitat ==
These hoverflies can be seen in forest roads, clearings, hedgerows and roadsides.

== Description ==
External images Cheilosia illustrata can reach a length of 9–11 millimetres (0.35–0.43 in). These hoverflies show a black face, a black scutellum, a band of black hair on the thorax and another on the third tergite. They have a dark area in the middle of the wings and long white hairs at the base of the forelegs and below the scutellum. The antennae are dark. The end of the abdomen is covered with reddish orange hair.

== Biology ==
They usually feed on umbellifers flowers, particularly on common hogweed (Heracleum sphondylium) and Angelica species. They fly from June to September with a peak during July and August. In autumn the larvae bore galleries into stems of hogweeds and in the roots of parsnip (Pastinaca sativa).
