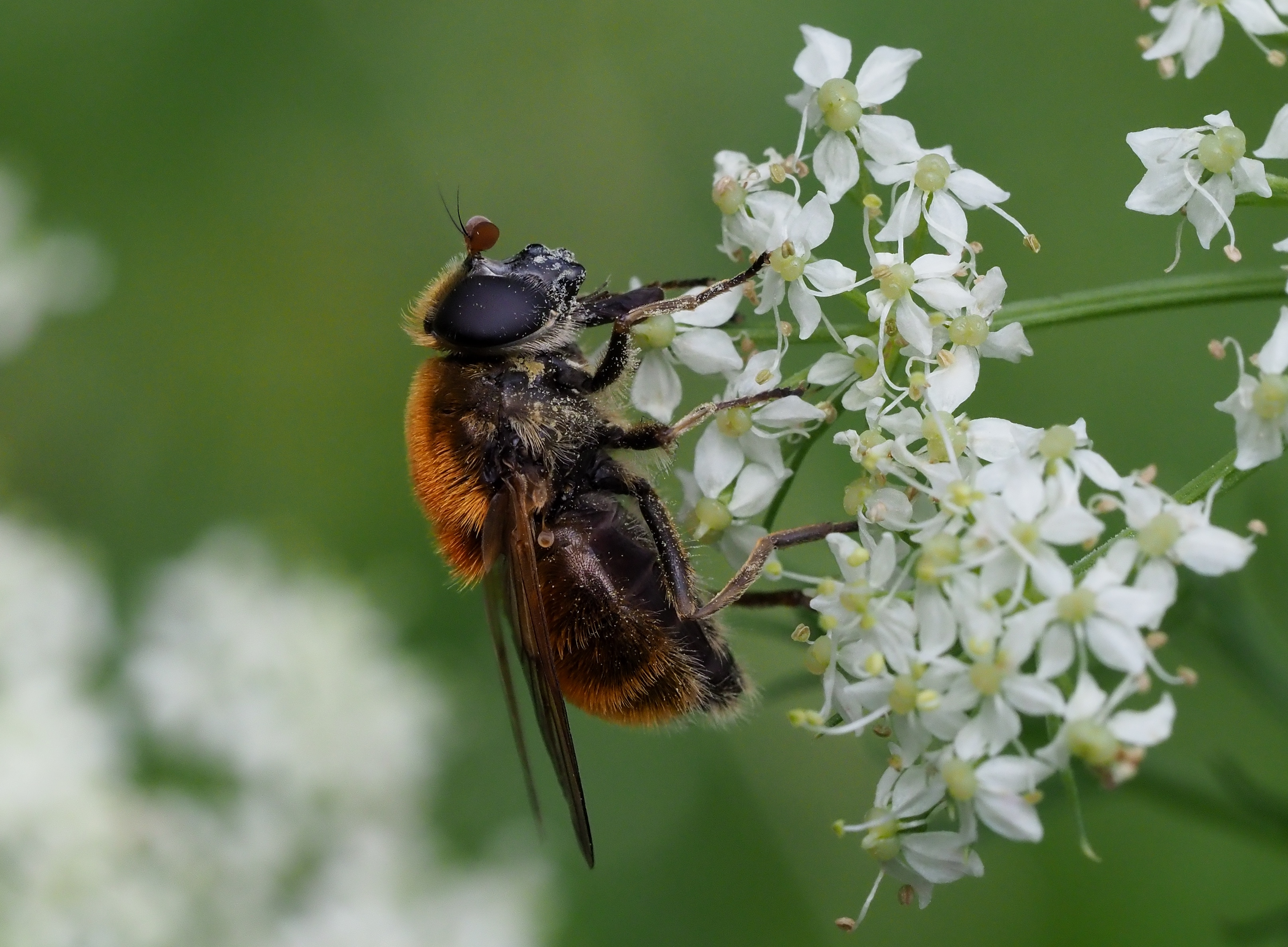

Scientific classification
- Kingdom: Animalia
- Phylum: Arthropoda
- Clade: Pancrustacea
- Class: Insecta
- Order: Diptera
- Family: Syrphidae
- Genus: Cheilosia
- Species: C. chrysocoma

Binomial name
- Cheilosia chrysocoma (Meigen 1822)

= Cheilosia chrysocoma =

Species of fly

Cheilosia chrysocoma is a European species of hoverfly.

== Description ==
External images For terms see Morphology of Diptera
The wing length is 8-10·25 mm. Wing cross veins darkened. Antennae with third segment brownish-red to yellowish-red and squarish above at the tip and the arista almost bare. Face with a small and rounded central knob situated lower than is usual in Cheilosia. Abdomen with conspicuously bright foxy-tawny pubescence. Mimics Osmia (Apidae).

== Distribution ==
Cheilosia chrysocoma is a Palearctic species. North Europe and Central Europe East to Russian Far East and Siberia.

== Biology ==
The habitat is wetland and Alnus and Salix woodland. Fen carr and alluvial softwood forest. Along tracks and in glades, on low-growing vegetation in the sun. Flowers visited include Caltha, Crataegus, Narcissus, Prunus, Ranunculus and Salix. Females have been seen egg-laying on Angelica sylvestris which may be the larval host plant. Flight period is April to June.
