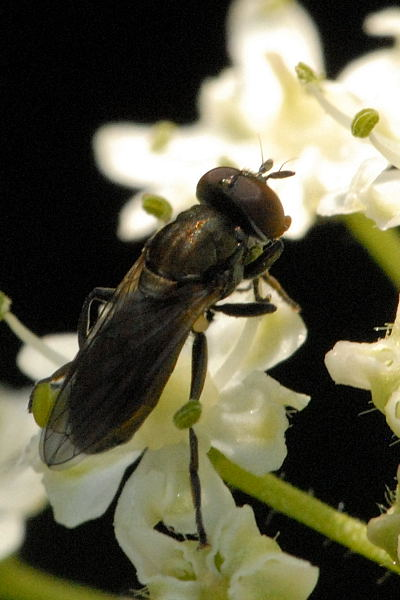

Scientific classification
- Kingdom: Animalia
- Phylum: Arthropoda
- Clade: Pancrustacea
- Class: Insecta
- Order: Diptera
- Family: Syrphidae
- Genus: Cheilosia
- Species: C. mutabilis

Binomial name
- Cheilosia mutabilis (Fallén, 1817)

Synonyms
- Eristalis mutabilis Fallén, 1817

= Cheilosia mutabilis =

Species of fly

Cheilosia mutabilis is a European species of hoverfly. Like most Cheilosia it is black, and because of this may often be overlooked as a hoverfly. It is little recorded, and is considered rare and scarce throughout most of its range.
