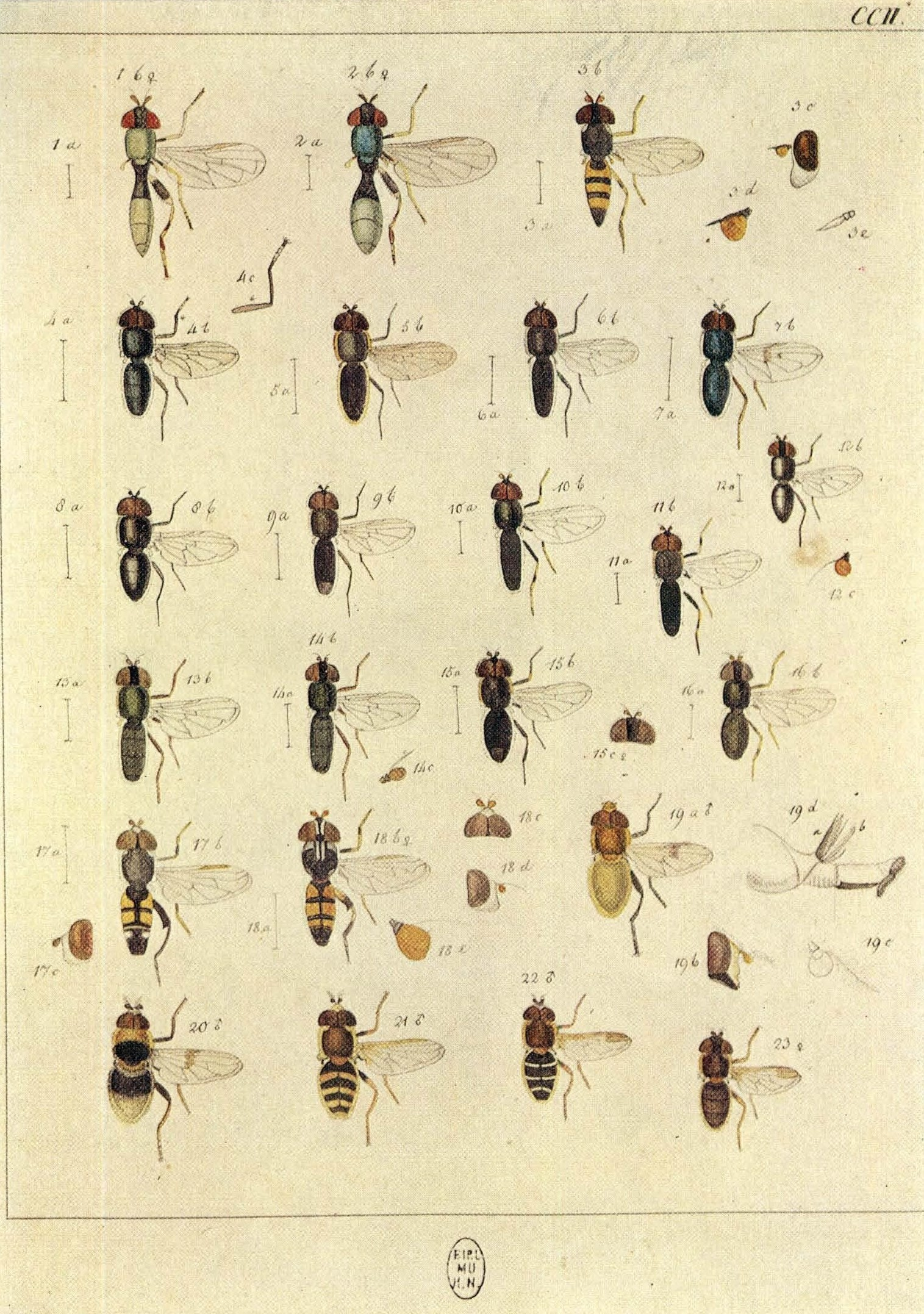
- Cheilosia antiqua in Meigen Europäischen Zweiflügeligen (figure 8)

Scientific classification
- Kingdom: Animalia
- Phylum: Arthropoda
- Clade: Pancrustacea
- Class: Insecta
- Order: Diptera
- Family: Syrphidae
- Genus: Cheilosia
- Species: C. antiqua

Binomial name
- Cheilosia antiqua (Meigen, 1822)

Synonyms
- Syrphus antiqua Meigen, 1822; Cheilosia sparsa Loew, 1837

= Cheilosia antiqua =

Species of fly

Cheilosia antiqua is a European species of hoverfly.

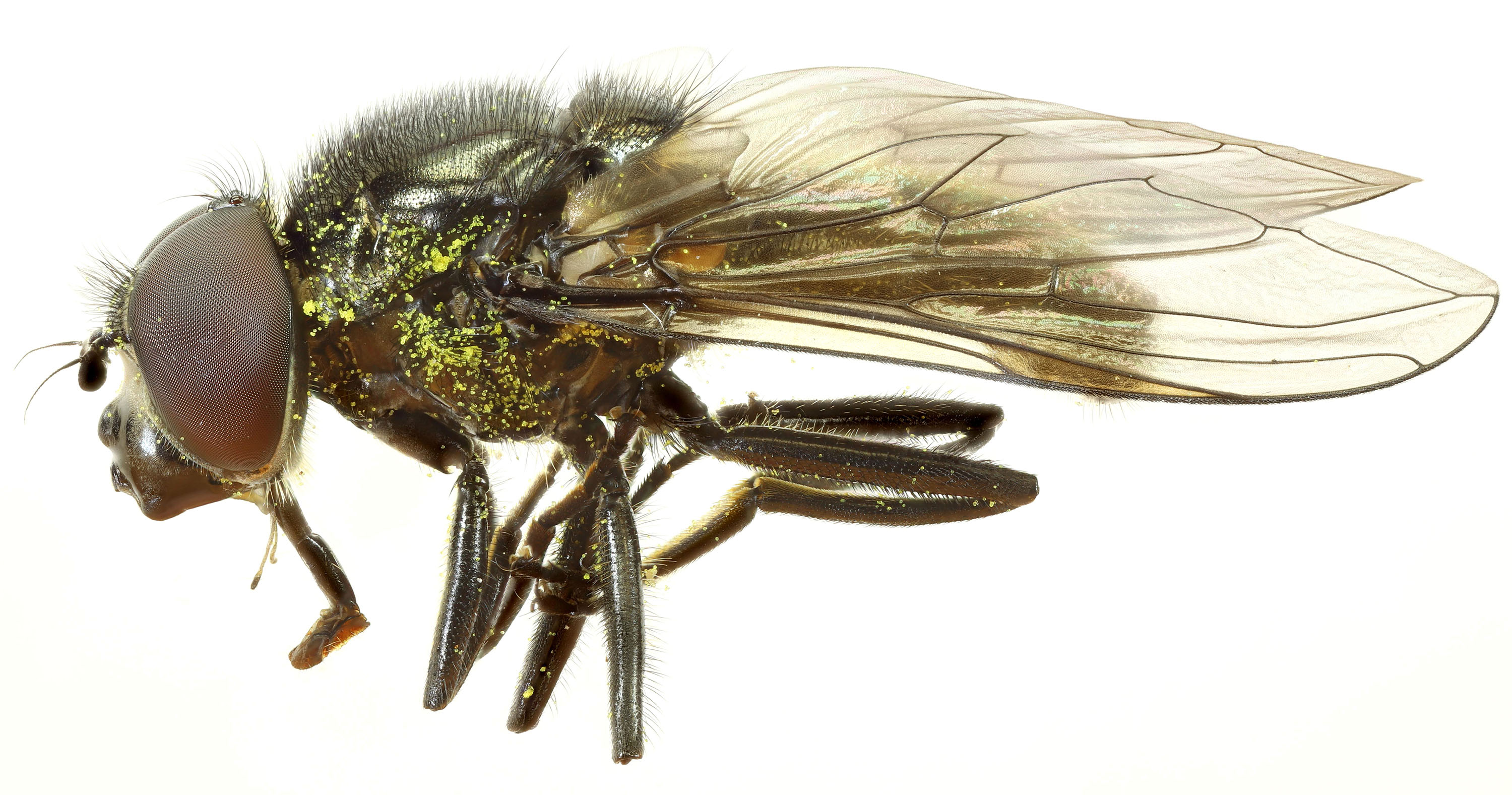
Cheilosia antiqua, Minera, North Wales

== Description ==
External images For terms see Morphology of Diptera
The wing length is 5 ·75-8·25 mm. Face with a conspicuous central prominence. Frons and facial prominence undusted. Thorax shining black with fine punctures. Legs entirely black. Part of the antiqua species group and difficult to determine. The larva is illustrated by Rotheray (1993)

== Distribution ==
Cheilosia antiqua is a Palearctic species with a limited distribution in Europe Ireland to Central Europe and Southern Europe, Balkans, Greece, European parts of Russia.

== Biology ==
The habitat is deciduous forest and unimproved pasture, including montane and subalpine pasture. Found in clearings and beside tracks in woodland and along old hedgerows. In the open in montane pasture. Flowers visited include Caltha, Cardamine, Fragaria, Iris, Ranunculusand Taraxacum.The flight period is April to June.
