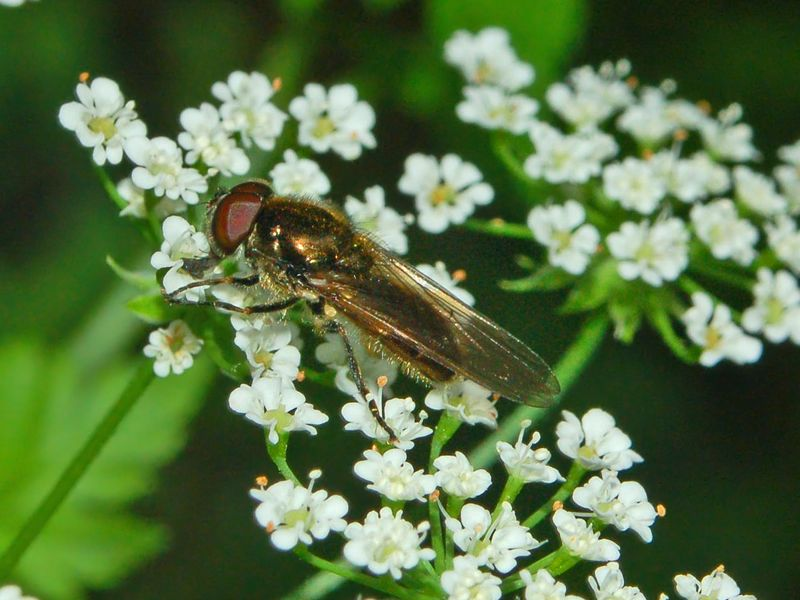
- Cheilosia cf. latifrons

Scientific classification
- Kingdom: Animalia
- Phylum: Arthropoda
- Clade: Pancrustacea
- Class: Insecta
- Order: Diptera
- Family: Syrphidae
- Genus: Cheilosia
- Species: C. latifrons

Binomial name
- Cheilosia latifrons (Zetterstedt, 1843)

Synonyms
- Cheilosia intonsa Loew, 1857; Eristalis latifrons Zetterstedt, 1843

= Cheilosia latifrons =

Species of fly

Cheilosia latifrons is a species of 'flower flies' or hoverflies belonging to the family Syrphidae subfamily Eristalinae.

This species is present in most of Europe, in the eastern Palearctic realm to Siberia, in the Near East, and in North Africa.

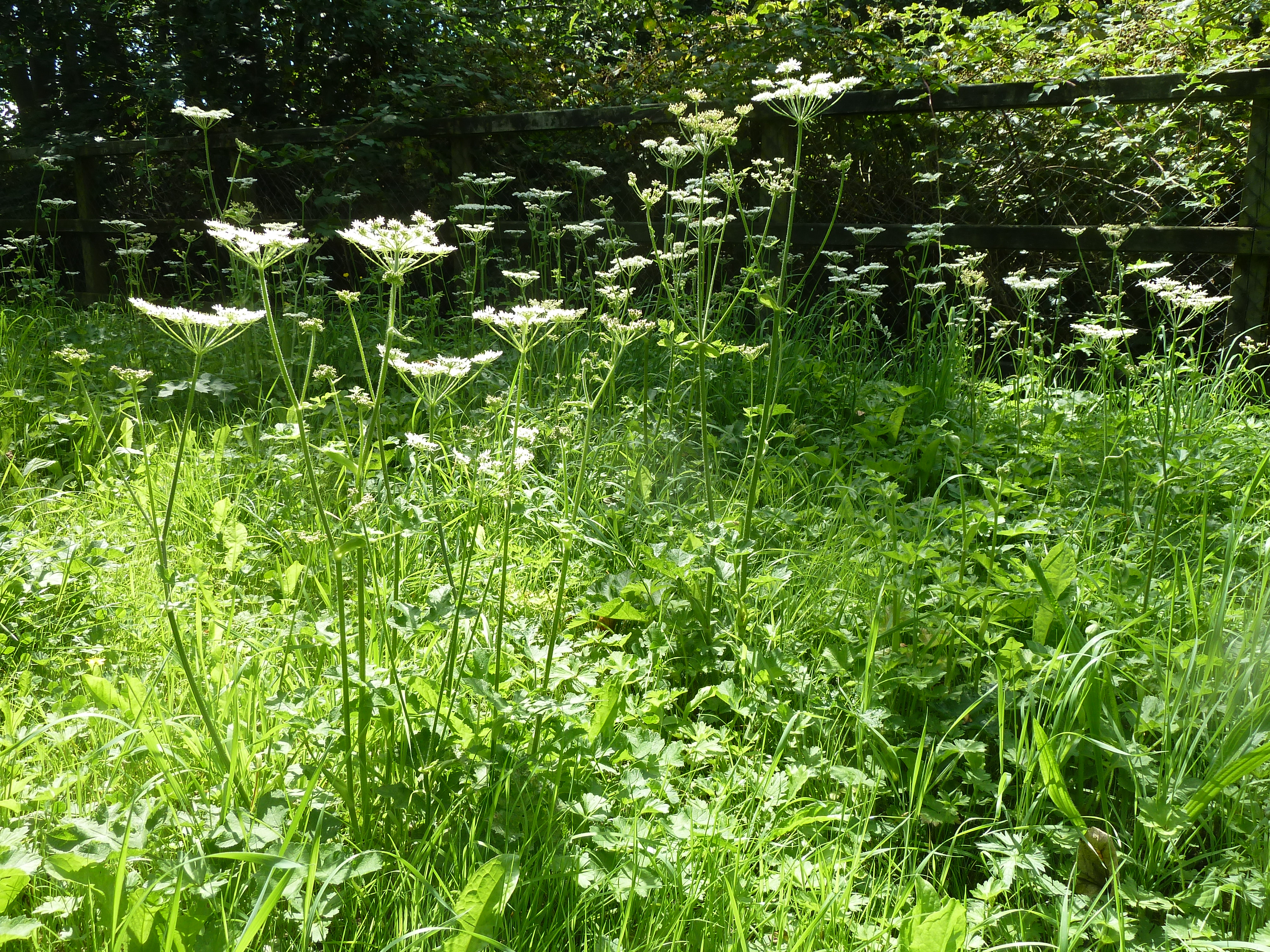
Habitat.Ireland.

The adults grow up to 6–9 millimetres (0.24–0.35 in) long and can mainly be encountered in meadows from May (March in South Europe) through September (with peaks in June or July and September), unimproved, non-calcareous grassland, usually on poorly drained sites and also coastal dune systems. It is low-flying, at the level of grasses and other low plants, among which it settles. Flowers visited include yellow Compositae, especially Senecio and Taraxacum; Origanum, Ranunculus, Luzula and Plantago.

The body is glossy black, with yellowish hair. Legs are yellow with a broad, black ring in the middle and the tarsi are dark. The scutellum is without obvious bristly hairs at margin, the antennae are black or partly or entirely dark reddish. The thorax is finely punctate.

The larvae probably develop in roots and stems of Leontodon autumnalis and Crepis species.
