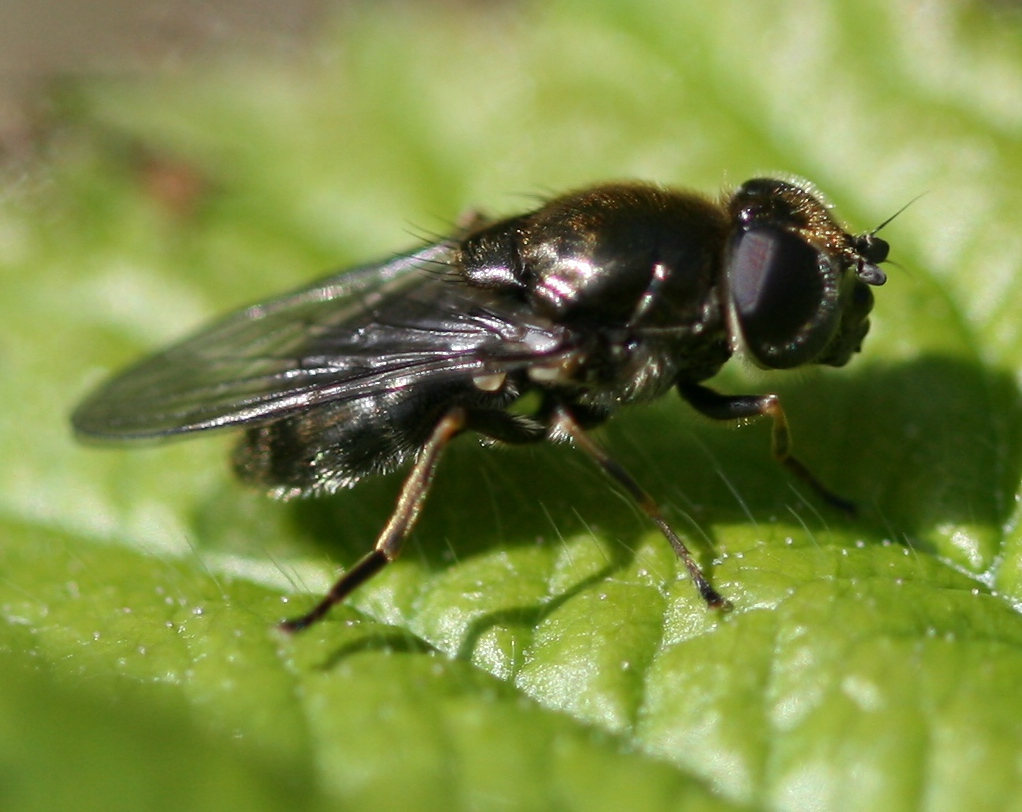
- Female

Scientific classification
- Kingdom: Animalia
- Phylum: Arthropoda
- Clade: Pancrustacea
- Class: Insecta
- Order: Diptera
- Family: Syrphidae
- Genus: Cheilosia
- Species: C. proxima

Binomial name
- Cheilosia proxima (Zetterstedt, 1843)

Synonyms
- Eristalis proxima Zetterstedt, 1843; Cheilosia modesta Egger, 1860

= Cheilosia proxima =

Species of fly

Cheilosia proxima is a European species of hoverfly.
