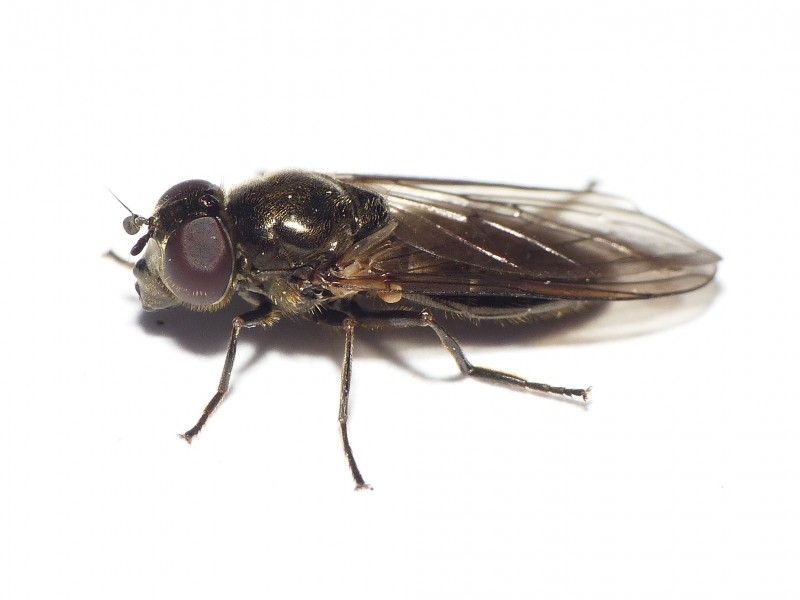
- Cheilosia semifasciata Netherlands

Scientific classification
- Kingdom: Animalia
- Phylum: Arthropoda
- Clade: Pancrustacea
- Class: Insecta
- Order: Diptera
- Family: Syrphidae
- Genus: Cheilosia
- Species: C. semifasciata

Binomial name
- Cheilosia semifasciata (Becker, 1894)

= Cheilosia semifasciata =

Species of fly

Cheilosia semifasciata is a Palearctic hoverfly.

== Description ==
External images For terms see Morphology of Diptera
Cheilosia semifasciata has a very low facial knob, (in line with the bottom of the eyes), hairy eyes, dark legs with pale knees and dark antennae. Males have square grey dust spots each side of tergites 2 to 5. See Schmid, U. (2000) for certain determination The larva is described and figured by Rotheray (1994).

== Distribution ==
Norway and Finland South to northern France. From Ireland East across mountains of Central Europe, Romania and Bulgaria.

== Habitats ==
Scree slopes, cliffs and rock outcrops up to 2000m. and gardens where the host plants are cultivated.

== Biology ==
A leaf miner of Saxifraga, Sedum and Umbilicus. Adults visit the flowers of Alliaria petiolata, Allium ursinum, Anemone nemorosa, Prunus spinosa, Ranunculus, Salix, Taraxacum and Vaccinium myrtillus flying in March to early June.
