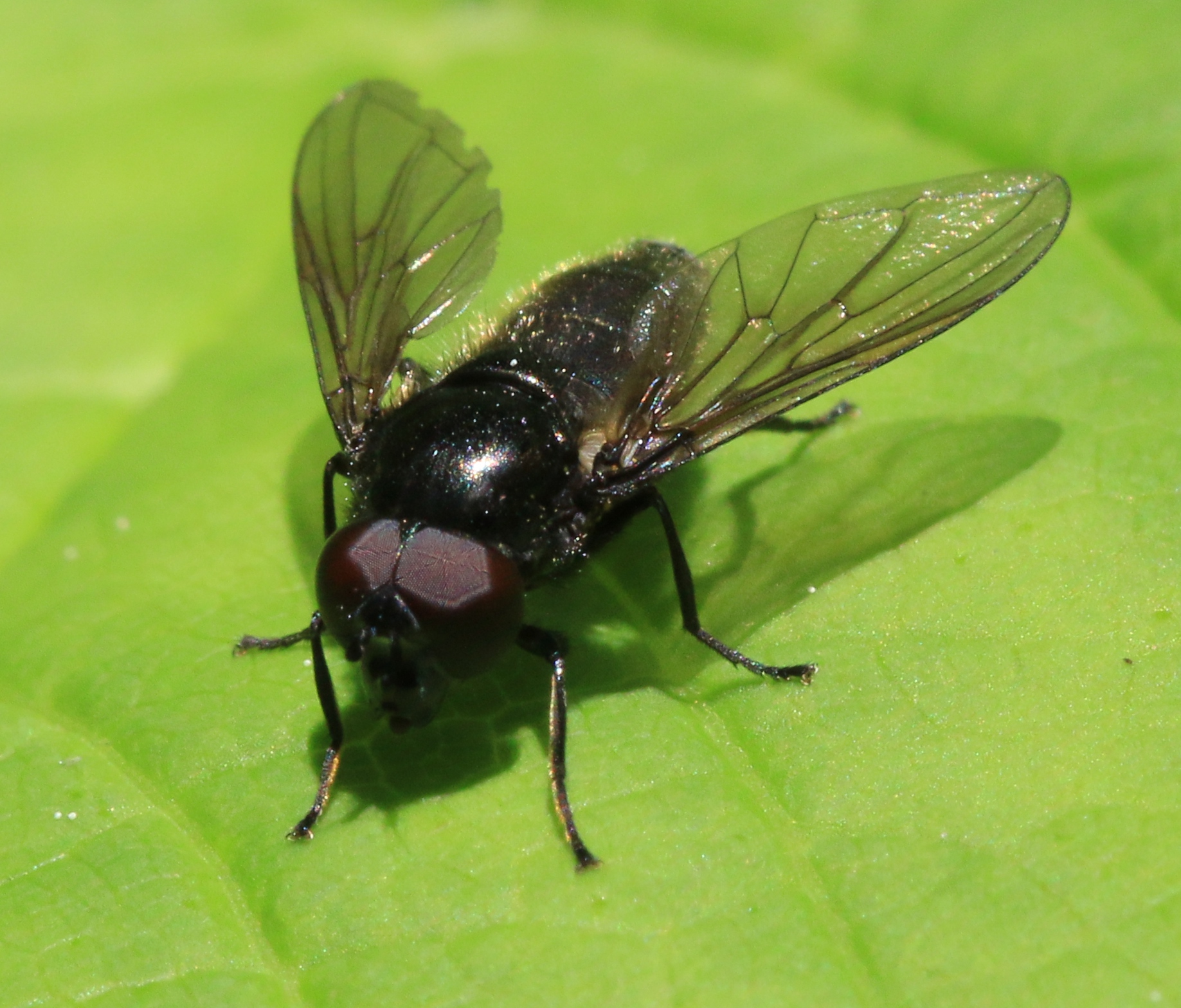

Scientific classification
- Kingdom: Animalia
- Phylum: Arthropoda
- Clade: Pancrustacea
- Class: Insecta
- Order: Diptera
- Family: Syrphidae
- Genus: Cheilosia
- Species: C. vicina

Binomial name
- Cheilosia vicina (Zetterstedt, 1849)

Synonyms
- Eristalis vicina Zetterstedt, 1849; Cheilosia nasutula Becker, 1894 misident.

= Cheilosia vicina =

Species of fly

Cheilosia vicina is a hoverfly species found in the Palearctic.

== Description ==
External images For terms see Morphology of Diptera
Wing length 5·25-7 ·75 mm. Wings slightly infuscated. Legs entirely black. Posterior and anterior anepisternum dusted. Arista short-haired. Face with central knob retroussé. A member of the antiqua species group and difficult to determine.

== Distribution ==
A Palearctic species with a limited distribution in Europe (Europe, except the Mediterranean, to Western Siberia)

== Biology ==
Habitat: Dune systems, unimproved pasture, montane grassland and alpine grassland and clearings in deciduous forest. Flowers visited include white umbellifers Caltha, Cirsium arvense, Leontodon, Leucanthemum, Menyanthes, Prunus spinosa, Ranunculus, Salix, Senecio, Taraxacum.Flies April to October.
