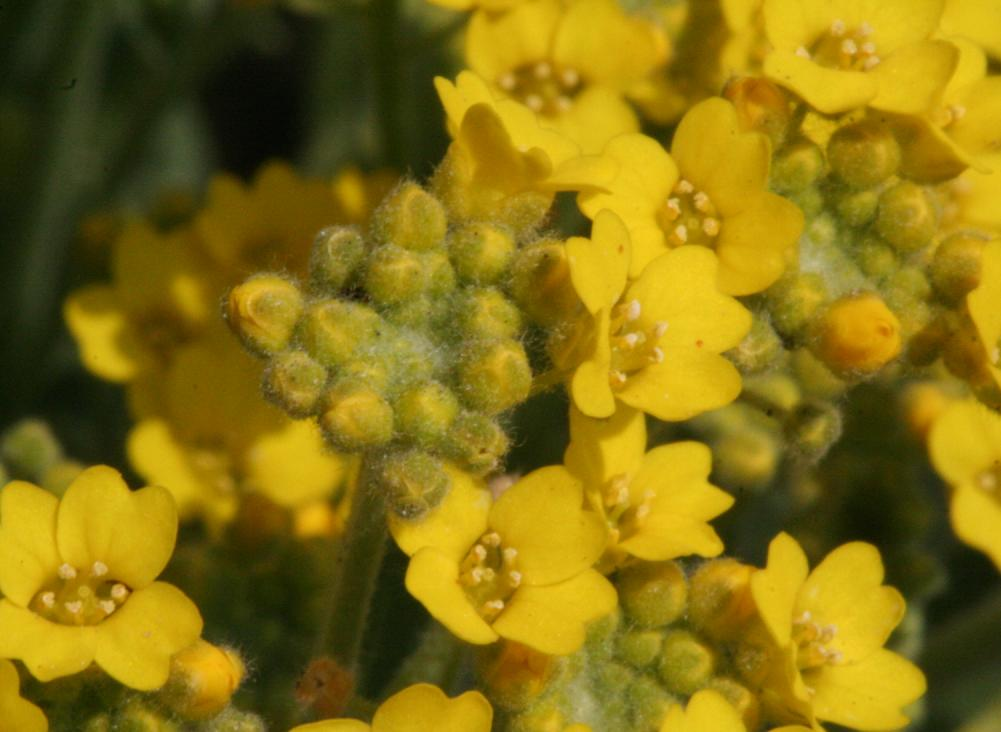
- Alyssum montanum

Scientific classification
- Kingdom: Plantae
- Clade: Tracheophytes
- Clade: Angiosperms
- Clade: Eudicots
- Clade: Rosids
- Order: Brassicales
- Family: Brassicaceae
- Genus: Alyssum; L.

Synonyms
- Adyseton Adans.; Alysson Crantz, orth. var.; Gamosepalum Hausskn.; Moenchia Roth; Psilonema C.A.Mey.

= Alyssum =

Genus of flowering plants

Alyssum is a genus of over a hundred species of flowering plants in the family Brassicaceae, native to temperate Europe, Asia, and northern Africa, with the highest species diversity in the Mediterranean region. The genus comprises annual and perennial herbaceous plants or (rarely) small shrubs, growing to 10–100 cm tall, with oblong-oval leaves. Alyssum flowers are characteristically small and grouped in terminal clusters; they are often yellow or white colored but can be pink or purple.

The genera Lobularia, Aurinia and Odontarrhena are closely related to Alyssum and were formerly included in it. The widely cultivated species popularly known as "sweet alyssum" (Alyssum maritimum) is Lobularia maritima. The common rockery plant (Alyssum saxatile) is Aurinia saxatilis.

Alyssum foliage is used as food by the caterpillars of certain Lepidoptera, including the Gem (Orthonama obstipata). However, rabbits will not eat it.

== Species ==
=== Accepted ===
The following is a list of accepted species. Unless noted otherwise, it follows AlyBase. An asterisk indicates provisionally accepted names. Plants of the World Online accepts 115 species. Species and synonyms accepted by PoWO but not by AlyBase are so noted.

- Alyssum aizoides Boiss.
- Alyssum alyssoides (L.) L.
- Alyssum amasianum Karabacak & A.Duran
- Alyssum anamense Velen.
- Alyssum andinum Rupr.
- Alyssum argyrophyllum Schott & Kotschy
- Alyssum armenum Boiss.
- Alyssum artvinense N.Busch
- Alyssum atlanticum Desf.
- Alyssum aurantiacum Boiss.
- Alyssum austrodalmaticum Trinajstić
- Alyssum bargalense*
- Alyssum baumgartnerianum Bornm. ex Baumg.
- Alyssum blancheanum Gomb.
- Alyssum bornmuelleri Hausskn. ex Degen
- Alyssum bosniacum Beck
- Alyssum bulbotrichum Hausskn. & Bornm.
- Alyssum cacuminum Španiel, Marhold & Lihová
- Alyssum caespitosum Baumg.
- Alyssum calycocarpum Rupr.
- Alyssum cephalotes Boiss.
- Alyssum clausonis Pomel* (synonym of A. atlanticum)
- Alyssum cognense Španiel, K.Kaplan, Juillerat & B.Bäumler
- Alyssum collinum Brot.
- Alyssum contemptum Schott & Kotschy
- Alyssum corningii T.R.Dudley
- Alyssum cuneifolium Ten.
- Alyssum dagestanicum Rupr.
- Alyssum damascenum Boiss. & Gaill.
- Alyssum dasycarpum Stephan ex Willd.
- Alyssum decoloratum Pomel* (synonym of A. atlanticum)
- Alyssum degenianum Nyár.
- Alyssum desertorum Stapf
- Alyssum diffusum Ten.
- Alyssum dimorphosepalum Eig
- Alyssum doerfleri Degen
- Alyssum embergeri Quézel* (synonym of A. atlanticum)
- Alyssum erosulum Gennari & Pestal. ex Clementi
- Alyssum fastigiatum Heywood
- Alyssum flahaultianum Emb. ex Greuter* (synonym of A. atlanticum)
- Alyssum flexicaule Jord.
- Alyssum foliosum Bory & Chaub.
- Alyssum fulvescens Sm.
- Alyssum gallaecicum (S.Ortiz) Španiel, Marhold & Lihová
- Alyssum gmelinii Jord.
- Alyssum granatense Boiss. & Reut.
- Alyssum gustavssonii Hartvig
- Alyssum hajastanum Avet.
- Alyssum handelii Hayek
- Alyssum harputicum T.R.Dudley
- Alyssum hezarmasjedense Kavousi & Nazary
- Alyssum hirsutum M.Bieb.
- Alyssum idaeum Boiss. & Heldr.
- Alyssum iljinskae V.I.Dorof.
- Alyssum iranicum Hausskn. ex Baumg.
- Alyssum kaynakiae Yılmaz
- Alyssum kotovii A.P.Iljinsk.* (synonym of A. repens)
- Alyssum lanceolatum Baumg.
- Alyssum lassiticum Halácsy
- Alyssum lenense Adams
- Alyssum lepidotostellatum (Hausskn. & Bornm.) T.R.Dudley
- Alyssum lepidotum Boiss.
- Alyssum loiseleurii P.Fourn.
- Alyssum luteolum Pomel
- Alyssum lycaonicum (O.E.Schulz) T.R.Dudley
- Alyssum macrocalyx Coss. & Durieu
- Alyssum macropodum Boiss. & Balansa
- Alyssum mazandaranicum Mirzadeh & Assadi
- Alyssum minutum Schltdl. ex DC.
- Alyssum misirdalianum Orcan & Binzet
- Alyssum moellendorfianum Asch. ex Beck
- Alyssum montanum L.
- Alyssum montenegrinum (Bald.) Španiel, Lihová & Marhold
- Alyssum mouradicum Boiss. & Balansa
- Alyssum muelleri Boiss. & Buhse
- Alyssum musilii Velen.
- Alyssum neglectum Magauer, Frajman & Schönsw.
- Alyssum nezaketiae Aytaç & H.Duman
- Alyssum niveum T.R.Dudley
- Alyssum numidicum Pomel* (synonym of A. atlanticum)
- Alyssum ochroleucum Boiss. & A.Huet
- Alyssum orophilum Jord. & Fourr.
- Alyssum oschtenicum (N.Busch) Kharkev.
- Alyssum paphlagonicum (Hausskn.) T.R.Dudley
- Alyssum patulum Pomel* (synonym of A. atlanticum)
- Alyssum persicum Boiss.
- Alyssum pirinicum (Stoj. & Acht.) Ančev
- Alyssum pluscanescens (Raim. ex Jos.Baumgartner) Španiel, Lihová & Marhold
- Alyssum pogonocarpum Carlström
- Alyssum praecox Boiss.
- Alyssum propinquum Baumg.
- Alyssum pseudomouradicum Hausskn. & Bornm. ex Baumg.
- Alyssum pulvinare Velen.
- Alyssum reiseri Velen.
- Alyssum repens Baumg.
- Alyssum rhodanense Jord. & Fourr.
- Alyssum rossetii Španiel, Bovio & K.Kaplan
- Alyssum rostratum Steven
- Alyssum scutigerum Durieu
- Alyssum siculum Jord.
- Alyssum simplex Rudolphi
- Alyssum simulans Runemark ex Hartvig
- Alyssum smyrnaeum C.A.Mey.
- Alyssum speciosum Pomel* (synonym of A. atlanticum)
- Alyssum sphacioticum Boiss. & Heldr.
- Alyssum stapfii Vierh.
- Alyssum stenostachyum Botsch. & Vved.* (synonym of A. szovitsianum)
- Alyssum stribrnyi Velen. (synonym of A. spruneri)
- Alyssum strictum Willd.
- Alyssum strigosum Banks & Sol.
- Alyssum sulphureum T.R.Dudley & Hub.-Mor.
- Alyssum szovitsianum Fisch. & C.A.Mey.
- Alyssum taygeteum Heldr.
- Alyssum tetrastemon Boiss.
- Alyssum thymops (Hub.-Mor. & Reese) T.R.Dudley
- Alyssum trichocarpum T.R.Dudley & Hub.-Mor.
- Alyssum trichostachyum Rupr.
- Alyssum turkestanicum Regel & Schmalh.
- Alyssum umbellatum Desv.
- Alyssum vernale Kit. ex Hornem.
- Alyssum wierzbickii Heuff.
- Alyssum wulfenianum Willd.
- Alyssum xanthocarpum Boiss.
- Alyssum xiphocarpum Candargy

=== Formerly included ===
The following names are listed by World Flora Online as accepted (as of the end of 2021), but in AlyBase have either been assigned to different genera (typically based on molecular phylogeny studies) or have been reduced to synonymy. A question mark indicates doubtful synonyms or species names with unresolved taxonomic status.

- Alyssum akamasicum B.L.Burtt → Odontarrhena akamasica
- Alyssum algeriense Pomel → Alyssum granatense?
- Alyssum alpestre L. → Odontarrhena alpestris
- Alyssum anamense Velen. → Odontarrhena singarensis?
- Alyssum anatolicum Hausskn. ex Nyár. → Odontarrhena anatolica
- Alyssum antiatlanticum Emb. & Maire → Cuprella antiatlantica
- Alyssum arabicum (Boiss.) T.Durand & Schinz → Lobularia arabica
- Alyssum argenteum All. → Odontarrhena argentea
- Alyssum aureum (Fenzl) Boiss. → Meniocus aureus
- Alyssum bertolonii Desv. → Odontarrhena bertolonii
- Alyssum blepharocarpum T.R.Dudley & Hub.-Mor. → Meniocus blepharocarpus
- Alyssum bracteatum Boiss. & Buhse → Odontarrhena bracteata
- Alyssum brughieri Brein ex Colla (unplaced)
- Alyssum caliacrae Nyár. → Odontarrhena tortuosa subsp. caliacrae
- Alyssum callichroum Boiss. & Balansa → Odontarrhena callichroa
- Alyssum caricum T.R.Dudley & Hub.-Mor. → Odontarrhena carica
- Alyssum cassium Boiss. → Odontarrhena cassia
- Alyssum chondrogynum B.L.Burtt → Odontarrhena chondrogyna
- Alyssum cilicicum Boiss. & Balansa → Odontarrhena cilicica
- Alyssum cochleatum Coss. & Durieu → Hormathophylla cochleata
- Alyssum condensatum Boiss. & Hausskn. → Odontarrhena condensata
- Alyssum constellatum Boiss. → Odontarrhena constellata
- Alyssum corsicum Duby → Odontarrhena corsica
- Alyssum corymbosoides Formánek → Odontarrhena corymbosoidea
- Alyssum crenulatum Boiss. & Heldr. → Odontarrhena crenulata
- Alyssum curetum Gand. → Alyssum idaeum
- Alyssum cypricum Nyár. → Odontarrhena cyprica
- Alyssum davisianum T.R.Dudley → Odontarrhena davisiana
- Alyssum davisianum T.R.Dudley → Odontarrhena davisiana
- Alyssum debarense Micevski → Odontarrhena debarensis
- Alyssum degenianum Nyár. → Odontarrhena muralis
- Alyssum densistellatum T.R.Dudley → Alyssum montanum s.l.
- Alyssum desertorum Stapf → Alyssum turkestanicum
- Alyssum dimorphosepalum Eig → Alyssum iranicum
- Alyssum discolor T.R.Dudley & Hub.-Mor. → Odontarrhena discolor
- Alyssum djurdjurae Chabert → Odontarrhena serpyllifolia
- Alyssum dubertretii Gomb. → Odontarrhena dubertretii
- Alyssum dudleyi Adıgüzel & R.D.Reeves → Odontarrhena dudleyi
- Alyssum emarginatum (Boiss.) Rouy → Bornmuellera emarginata
- Alyssum erigens Jord. & Fourr. → Alyssum vernale
- Alyssum eriophyllum Boiss. & Hausskn. → Odontarrhena eriophylla
- Alyssum euboeum Halácsy → Odontarrhena euboea
- Alyssum fallacinum Hausskn. → Odontarrhena heldreichii
- Alyssum fedtschenkoanum N.Busch → Odontarrhena fedtschenkoana
- Alyssum filiforme Nyár. → Odontarrhena filiformis
- Alyssum floribundum Boiss. & Balansa → Odontarrhena floribunda
- Alyssum fragillimum (Bald.) Rech.f. → Odontarrhena fragillima
- Alyssum gadorense P.Küpfer → Alyssum fastigiatum
- Alyssum gehamense Fed. → Odontarrhena gehamensis
- Alyssum gevgelicense Micevski → Odontarrhena gevgelicensis
- Alyssum giosnanum Nyár. → Odontarrhena giosnana
- Alyssum globosum (Desv.) Kuntze → Physaria globosa
- Alyssum gymnopodum P.A.Smirn. → Odontarrhena tortuosa subsp. cretacea
- Alyssum hakaszkii Nyár. → Odontarrhena obovata
- Alyssum haussknechtii Boiss. → Odontarrhena haussknechtii
- Alyssum heldreichii Hausskn. → Odontarrhena heldreichii
- Alyssum heterotrichum Boiss. → Meniocus heterotrichus
- Alyssum homalocarpum (Fisch. & C.A.Mey.) Boiss. → Cuprella homalocarpa
- Alyssum huber-morathii T.R.Dudley → Odontarrhena huber-morathii
- Alyssum huetii Boiss. → Meniocus huetii
- Alyssum kavadarcense Micevski → Odontarrhena kavadarcensis
- Alyssum klimesii Al-Shehbaz → Ladakiella klimesii
- Alyssum kurdicum (Boiss.) Nyár. → Odontarrhena kurdica
- Alyssum lanigerum DC. → Odontarrhena lanigera
- Alyssum leiocarpum Pomel → Alyssum minutum
- Alyssum lesbiacum (P.Candargy) Rech.f. → Odontarrhena lesbiaca
- Alyssum libanoticum Nyár. → Odontarrhena libanotica
- Alyssum linifolium Stephan ex Willd. → Meniocus linifolius
- Alyssum longistylum (Sommier & Levier) Grossh. → Odontarrhena tortuosa subsp. tortuosa
- Alyssum luteolum Pomel → Alyssum granatense?
- Alyssum markgrafii O.E.Schulz → Odontarrhena markgrafii
- Alyssum masmenaeum Boiss. → Odontarrhena masmenaea
- Alyssum mazandaranicum Mirzadeh & Assadi → Alyssum turkestanicum
- Alyssum meniocoides Boiss. → Meniocus meniocoides
- Alyssum microphylliforme Nyár. → Odontarrhena tortuosa subsp. tortuosa?
- Alyssum mozaffarianii Kavousi → Odontarrhena mozaffarianii
- Alyssum mughlaei Orcan → Odontarrhena mughlaei
- Alyssum murale Waldst. & Kit. → Odontarrhena muralis
- Alyssum musilii Velen. → Cuprella homalocarpa
- Alyssum nebrodense Tineo → Odontarrhena nebrodensis
- Alyssum obovatum (C.A.Mey.) Turcz. → Odontarrhena obovata
- Alyssum obtusifolium Steven ex DC. → Odontarrhena obtusifolia
- Alyssum odoratum? Colla
- Alyssum orbelicum Ančev & Uzunov → Odontarrhena orbelica
- Alyssum orbiculare (Regel) Nyár. → Odontarrhena obovata
- Alyssum ovirense A.Kern. → Alyssum wulfenianum subsp. ovirense
- Alyssum oxycarpum Boiss. & Balansa → Odontarrhena oxycarpa
- Alyssum pateri Nyár. → Odontarrhena pateri
- Alyssum peltarioides Boiss. → Odontarrhena peltarioidea
- Alyssum penjwinense T.R.Dudley → Odontarrhena penjwinensis
- Alyssum pinifolium (Nyár.) T.R.Dudley → Odontarrhena pinifolia
- Alyssum polycladum Rech.f. → Odontarrhena polyclada
- Alyssum pterocarpum T.R.Dudley → Odontarrhena pterocarpa
- Alyssum robertianum Bernard ex Gren. & Godr. → Odontarrhena robertiana
- Alyssum samariferum Boiss. & Hausskn. → Odontarrhena samarifera
- Alyssum samium T.R.Dudley & Christod. → Odontarrhena samia
- Alyssum scardicum Wettst. → Alyssum montanum s.l.
- Alyssum sergievskajae Krasnob. → Stevenia sergievskajae
- Alyssum serpentinum Micevski → Odontarrhena serpentina
- Alyssum serpyllifolium Desf. → Odontarrhena serpyllifolia
- Alyssum sibiricum Willd. → Odontarrhena sibirica
- Alyssum singarense Boiss. & Hausskn. → Odontarrhena singarensis
- Alyssum skopjense Micevski → Odontarrhena skopjensis
- Alyssum smolikanum Nyár. → Odontarrhena smolikana
- Alyssum spruneri Jord. & Fourr. → Alyssum montanum s.l.
- Alyssum stipitatum Kavousi & T.R.Dudley → Odontarrhena stipitata
- Alyssum stylare (Boiss. & Balansa) Boiss. → Meniocus stylaris
- Alyssum subbaicalicum Nyár. → Odontarrhena obovata
- Alyssum subspinosum T.R.Dudley → Odontarrhena subspinosa
- Alyssum syriacum Nyár. → Odontarrhena syriaca
- Alyssum szarabiacum Nyár. → Odontarrhena szarabiaca
- Alyssum tavolarae Briq. → Odontarrhena tavolarae
- Alyssum tenium Halácsy → Odontarrhena diffusa
- Alyssum tenuifolium Stephan ex Willd. → Stevenia tenuifolia
- Alyssum tortuosum Waldst. & Kit. ex Willd. → Odontarrhena tortuosa subsp. tortuosa
- Alyssum trapeziforme Bornm. ex Nyár. → Odontarrhena trapeziformis
- Alyssum troodi Boiss. → Odontarrhena troodi
- Alyssum turgidum T.R.Dudley → Odontarrhena turgida
- Alyssum virgatum Nyár. → Odontarrhena virgata
