= Coleophora kautzi =

Scientific classification
- Kingdom: Animalia
- Phylum: Arthropoda
- Class: Insecta
- Order: Lepidoptera
- Family: Coleophoridae
- Genus: Coleophora
- Species: C. kautzi

Binomial name
- Coleophora kautzi Rebel, 1933

Synonyms
- Coleophora andalusiae Toll, 1960; Coleophora pirizanella Toll, 1959

Species of moth

Coleophora kautzi is a moth of the family Coleophoridae. It is found in the Mediterranean region and southern Russia.

The larvae feed on Alyssum minus and Alyssum montanum.
