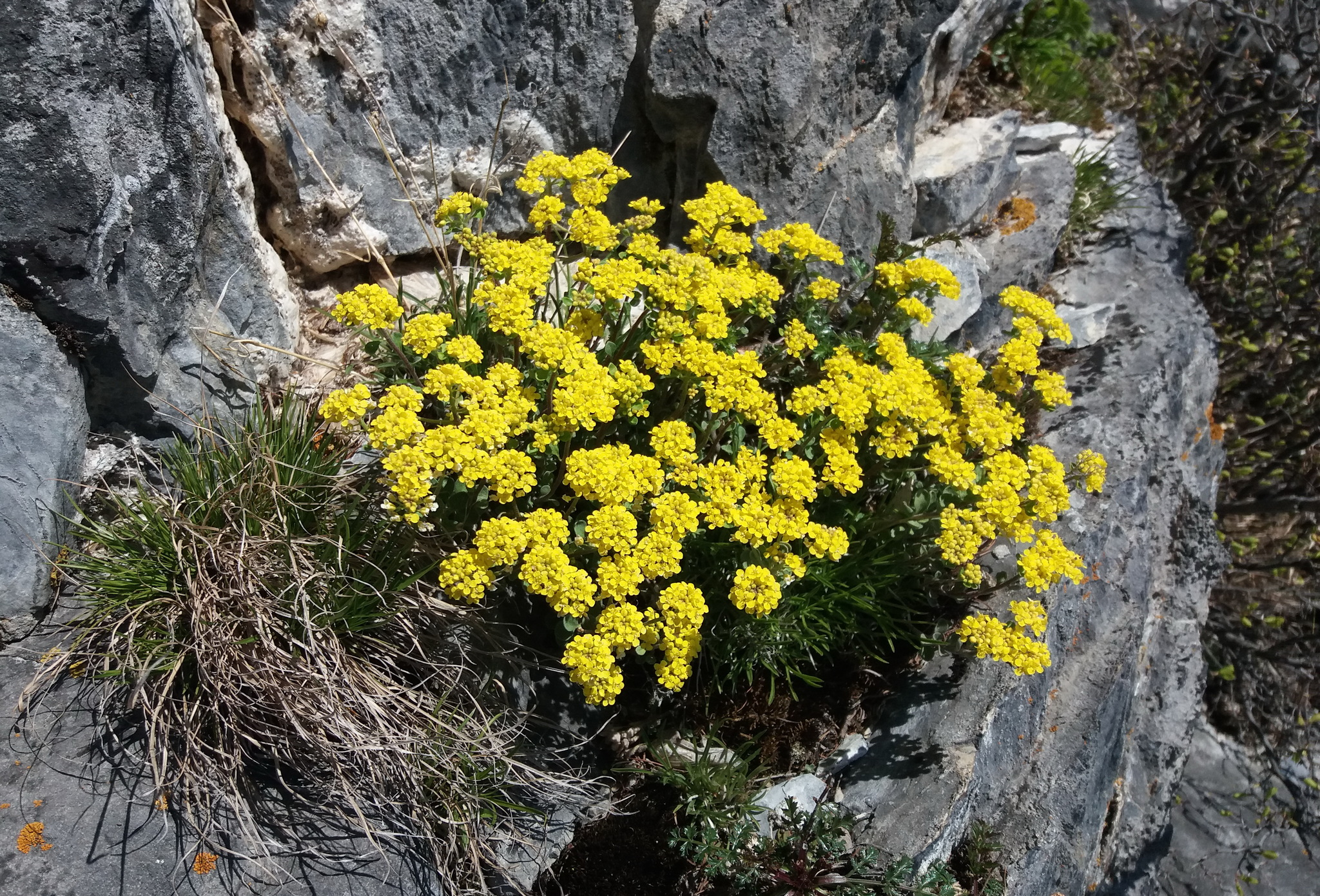
- Previously Alyssum obovatum now Odontarrhena obovata

Scientific classification
- Kingdom: Plantae
- Clade: Embryophytes
- Clade: Tracheophytes
- Clade: Spermatophytes
- Clade: Angiosperms
- Clade: Eudicots
- Clade: Rosids
- Order: Brassicales
- Family: Brassicaceae
- Genus: Odontarrhena; C.A.Mey.

Species
- See text

Synonyms
- Triplopetalum Nyár.

= Odontarrhena =

Genus of flowering plants

Odontarrhena is a large genus of flowering plants in the family Brassicaceae. They were originally a separate genus and then were amalgamated into the Alyssum genus, but morphological and molecular evidence has reseparated them. Some of the genera are nickel (Ni) hyperaccumulators (a plant capable of accumulating metals from soil or water, up to very high concentrations in the plant).

== Description ==
It is similar in habit to Alyssum and has small yellow flowers, except that it has a suborbicular pouch and one seeded cells. The plants are characterised by inflorescences that are usually compound, subumbellate racemes. There is a single ovule per loculus, and the fruit valves are at most only slightly inflated.

=== Range ===
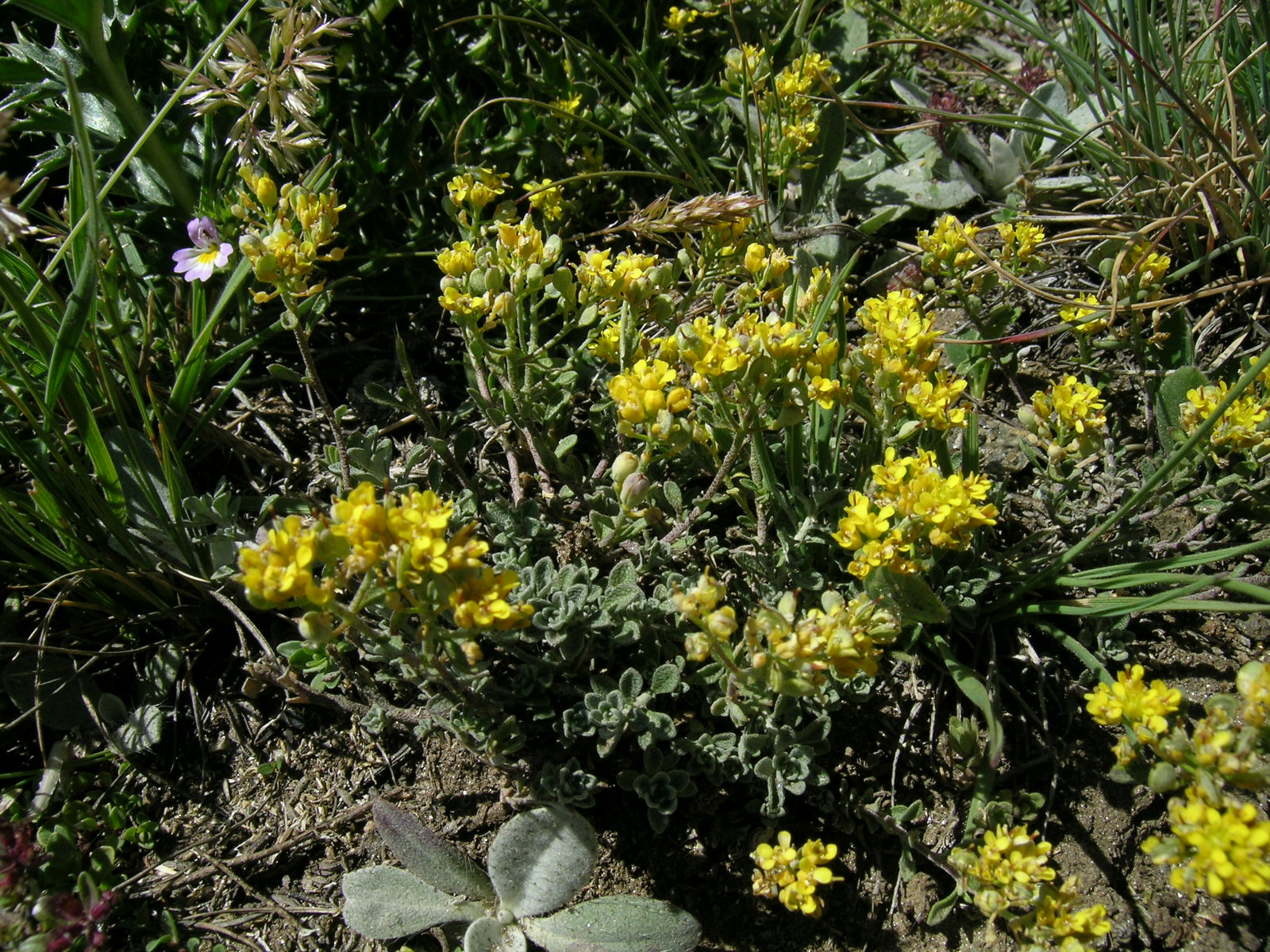
Odontarrhena alpestris

Its widespread native range is from temperate Eurasia to subarctic America. It is found in Europe (within Albania, Bulgaria, Corsica, Crete, Czechoslovakia, East Aegean Islands, France, Greece, Hungary, Italy, Romania, Sardina, Sicily, Switzerland and former Yugoslavia), Eastern Europe (within Central European Russia, Crimea, East European Russia, North European Russia, South European Russia and Ukraine), Siberia (within Altai, Buryatiya, Chita Oblast, Irkutsk Oblast, Krasnoyarsk Krai, Tuva, West Siberia and Yakutskiya), the Russian Far East (within Amur Oblast, Khabarovsk Krai and Magadan Oblast), Central Asia (within Kazakhstan and Turkmenistan), the Caucasus (North Caucasus and Transcaucasus), Western Asia (Afghanistan, Cyprus, Iran, Iraq, Lebanon, Palestine, Saudi Arabia, Syria and Turkey), China (Inner Mongolia, Manchuria and Xinjiang), Mongolia and also Subarctic America (within Alaska, Northwest Territories and the Yukon).

The Balkan Peninsula is a major diversity center. Greece has the largest number of species; next, Albania is known to have 7 species. It is also found on the serpentine soils of Lesbos Island (in Greece).

== Taxonomy ==
Odontarrhena was a taxonomically difficult genus of the tribe Alysseae. However, recent morphological and molecular evidence (DNA analysis) clearly showed that Alyssum and Odontarrhena are monophyletic clades within the tribe Alysseae, deserving separate generic status (Warwick et al. 2008; Cecchi et al. 2010; Rešetnik et al. 2013; Li et al. 2015).

The genus name of Odontarrhena is derived from two Greek words; odous meaning tooth and arrhen meaning male. It was first described and published by Carl Anton von Meyer in Flora Altaica (edited by Carl Friedrich von Ledebour) Vol.3 on page 58 in 1831.

The genus is recognized by the United States Department of Agriculture and the Agricultural Research Service, but they still list it as synonym of Alyssum L. and they only list Odontarrhena obovata C. A. Mey. as a known species.

== Known species ==
The following list includes all species recognised by either Plants of the World Online (as of January 2022) or by BrassiBase (version 1.3, June 2020). Of these, 80 species are recognised by both databases, with the remaining 16 accepted by only one of them (this is indicated in each entry).

- Odontarrhena akamasica (B.L. Burtt) Španiel & al.
- Odontarrhena albiflora (F.K. Mey.) Španiel & al.
- Odontarrhena alpestris (L.) Ledeb.
- Odontarrhena americana (Greene) D.A.German; only in Plants of the World Online; in BrassiBase it is a synonym of Odontarrhena obovata
- Odontarrhena anatolica (Hausskn. ex Nyár.) Španiel & al.
- Odontarrhena argentea (All.) Ledeb.
- Odontarrhena baldaccii (Vierh. ex Nyár.) Španiel; only in Plants of the World Online
- Odontarrhena bertolonii (Desv.) Jord. & Fourr.
- Odontarrhena borzaeana (Nyár.) D.A. German; accepted in BrassiBase; in Plants of the World Online it is a synonym of Odontarrhena obtusifolia
- Odontarrhena bracteata (Boiss. & Buhse) Španiel & al.
- Odontarrhena caliacrae (Nyár.) D.A.German; only in Plants of the World Online; in BrassiBase it is a synonym of Odontarrhena tortuosa subsp. caliacrae
- Odontarrhena callichroa (Boiss. & Balansa) Španiel & al.
- Odontarrhena carica (T.R. Dudley & Hub.-Mor.) Španiel & al.
- Odontarrhena cassia (Boiss.) Španiel & al.
- Odontarrhena chalcidica (Janka) Španiel & al.
- Odontarrhena chondrogyna (B.L. Burtt) Španiel & al.
- Odontarrhena cilicica (Boiss. & Balansa) Španiel & al.
- Odontarrhena condensata (Boiss. & Hausskn.) Jord. & Fourr.
- Odontarrhena constellata (Boiss.) Španiel & al.
- Odontarrhena corsica (Duby) Španiel & al.
- Odontarrhena corymbosoidea (Formánek) Španiel & al.
- Odontarrhena crenulata (Boiss.) Španiel & al.
- Odontarrhena cyprica (Nyár.) Španiel & al.
- Odontarrhena davisiana (T.R. Dudley) Španiel & al.
- Odontarrhena debarensis (Micevski) Španiel & al.
- Odontarrhena decipiens (Nyár.) L.Cecchi & Selvi; according to Plants of the World Online; on BrassiBase it is Odontarrhena lurensis
- Odontarrhena diffusa Jord. & Fourr.; accepted in BrassiBase; in Plants of the World Online it is a synonym of Odontarrhena argentea
- Odontarrhena discolor (T.R. Dudley & Hub.-Mor.) Španiel & al.
- Odontarrhena dubertretii (Comb.) Španiel & al.
- Odontarrhena dudleyi (N. Adiguzel & R.D. Reeves) Španiel & al.
- Odontarrhena elatior (F.K. Mey.) Španiel & al.; accepted in BrassiBase; in Plants of the World Online it is a synonym of Odontarrhena chalcidica
- Odontarrhena eriophylla (Boiss. & Hausskn.) Španiel & al.
- Odontarrhena euboea (Halácsy) Španiel & al.
- Odontarrhena fallacina (Hausskn.) Španiel & al.; accepted in BrassiBase; in Plants of the World Online it is a synonym of Odontarrhena heldreichii
- Odontarrhena fedtschenkoana (N. Busch) D.A. German
- Odontarrhena filiformis (Nyár.) Španiel & al.
- Odontarrhena floribunda (Boiss. & Balansa) Španiel & al.
- Odontarrhena fragillima (Bald.) Španiel & al.
- Odontarrhena gehamensis (Fed.) D.A. German
- Odontarrhena gevgelicensis (Micevski) Španiel & al.
- Odontarrhena giosnana (Nyár.) Španiel & al.
- Odontarrhena haradjianii (Rech.f.) Španiel & al.
- Odontarrhena haussknechtii (Boiss.) Španiel & al.
- Odontarrhena heldreichii (Hausskn.) Španiel & al.
- Odontarrhena huber-morathii (T.R. Dudley) Španiel & al.
- Odontarrhena inflata (Nyár.) D.A. German
- Odontarrhena kavadarcensis (Micevski) Španiel & al.
- Odontarrhena kurdica (Boiss.) Španiel & al.
- Odontarrhena lanigera (DC.) Španiel & al.
- Odontarrhena lesbiaca P. Candargy
- Odontarrhena libanotica (Nyár.) Španiel & al.
- Odontarrhena litvinovii (Knjasev) Španiel & al.
- Odontarrhena lurensis (F.K. Mey.) Španiel & al.; according to BrassiBase; in Plants of the World Online it is Odontarrhena decipiens
- Odontarrhena markgrafii (O.E. Schulz ex Markgr.) Španiel & al.; accepted in BrassiBase; in Plants of the World Online it is a synonym of Odontarrhena chalcidica
- Odontarrhena masmenaea (Boiss.) Španiel & al.
- Odontarrhena metajnae (Plazibat) Španiel & al.
- Odontarrhena moravensis (F.K.Mey.) L.Cecchi & Selvi; only in Plants of the World Online
- Odontarrhena mozaffarianii (Kavousi) Španiel; only in Plants of the World Online
- Odontarrhena mughlaei (Orcan) Španiel & al.
- Odontarrhena muralis (Waldst. & Kit.) Endl.
- Odontarrhena nebrodensis (Tineo) L. Cecchi & Selvi
- Odontarrhena obovata C.A. Mey.
- Odontarrhena obtusifolia (Steven ex DC.) C.A. Mey.
- Odontarrhena orbelica (Ančev & Uzunov) Španiel & al.
- Odontarrhena oxycarpa (Boiss. & Balansa) Španiel & al.
- Odontarrhena pateri (Nyár.) Španiel & al.
- Odontarrhena peltarioidea (Boiss.) Španiel & al.
- Odontarrhena penjwinensis (T.R. Dudley) Španiel & al.
- Odontarrhena pinifolia (Nyár.) Španiel & al.
- Odontarrhena polyclada (Rech.f.) Španiel & al.
- Odontarrhena pterocarpa (T.R. Dudley) Španiel & al.
- Odontarrhena pugiostyla (Nyár.) Španiel & al.
- Odontarrhena rigida (Nyár.) L.Cecchi & Selvi; only in Plants of the World Online
- Odontarrhena robertiana (Bernard ex Gren. & Godr.) Španiel & al.
- Odontarrhena samarifera (Boiss. & Hausskn.) Španiel & al.
- Odontarrhena samia (T.R. Dudley & Christodoulakis) Španiel & al.
- Odontarrhena schirwanica (Rupr.) D.A. German; accepted in BrassiBase; in Plants of the World Online it is a synonym of Odontarrhena tortuosa subsp. tortuosa
- Odontarrhena serpentina (Micevski) Španiel & al.
- Odontarrhena serpentinicola (F.K. Mey.) Španiel & al.
- Odontarrhena serpyllifolia (Desf.) Jord. & Fourr.; according to BrassiBase; in Plants of the World Online it is Alyssum serpyllifolium
- Odontarrhena sibirica (Willd.) Španiel & al.
- Odontarrhena singarensis (Boiss. & Hausskn.) Španiel & al.
- Odontarrhena skopjensis (Micevski) Španiel & al.
- Odontarrhena smolikana (Nyár.) Španiel & al.
- Odontarrhena stipitata (Kavousi & T.R. Dudley) Španiel & al.
- Odontarrhena stridii L.Cecchi, Španiel & Selvi; only in Plants of the World Online
- Odontarrhena subalpina (M. Bieb.) D.A. German
- Odontarrhena subspinosa (T.R. Dudley) Španiel & al.
- Odontarrhena syriaca (Nyár.) Španiel & al.
- Odontarrhena szarabiaca (Nyár.) D.A. German
- Odontarrhena tavolarae (Briq.) L. Cecchi & Selvi
- Odontarrhena tortuosa (Waldst. & Kit. ex Willd.) C.A. Mey.
- Odontarrhena trapeziformis (Bornm. ex Nyár.) Španiel & al.
- Odontarrhena troodi (Boiss.) Španiel & al.
- Odontarrhena turgida (T.R. Dudley) Španiel & al.
- Odontarrhena virgata (Nyár.) Španiel & al.

== Uses ==
About 48 members of the Odontarrhena species, are known to be nickel (Ni) hyperaccumulators (a plant capable of accumulating metals from soil or water, up to very high concentrations in the plant). The accumulation of nickel was first discovered in the Italian endemic Odontarrhena bertolonii (Desv.) Jord. and Fourr. (syn. Alyssum bertolonii Desv. by Minguzzi and Vergnano in 1948, Of the 168 or so species of Alyssum, 45 species were determined to be hyperaccumulators of nickel, all from the Odontarrhena section. The metal is found in the roots, stem, leaves and flowers of the plant.

== Other sources ==
- Cecchi, L., Colzi, I., Coppi, A., Gonnelli, C. & Selvi, F. (2013) Diversity and biogeography of Ni-hyperaccumulators of Alyssum section Odontarrhena (Brassicaceae) in the central western Mediterranean: evidence from karyology, morphology and DNA sequence data. Botanical journal of the Linnaean Society 173: 269–289.
- Nyárády, E.J. (1929a) [“1928”] Studiu preliminar asupra unor specii de Alyssum din secţia Odontarrhena. Vorstudium über einige Arten der Section Odontarrhena der Gattung Alyssum (Forsetzung). Buletinul Gradinii Botanice si al Muzeului Botanic dela Universitatea din Cluj 8 (2–4): 152–156.
