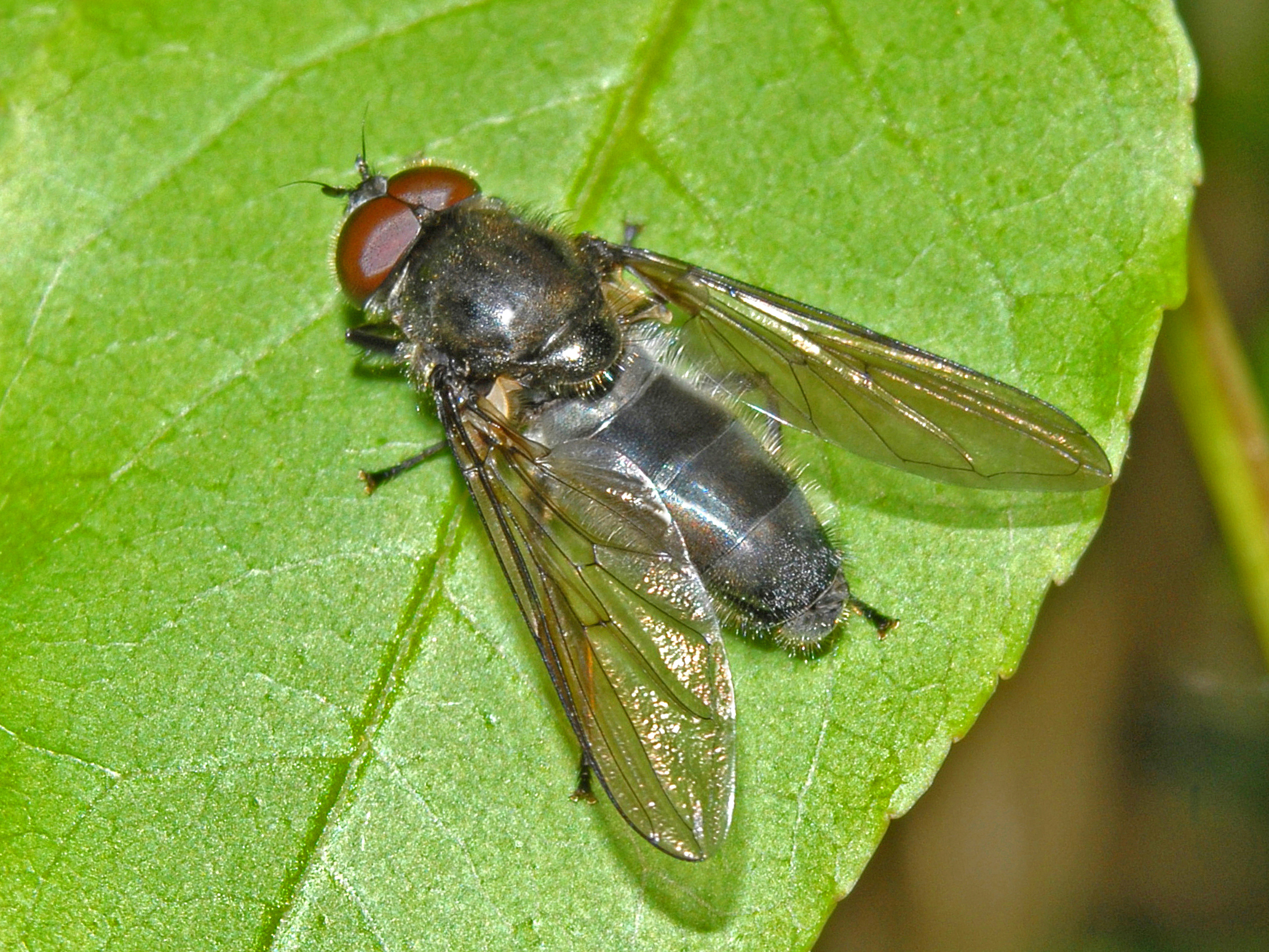
- Male of Cheilosia variabilis. Dorsal view
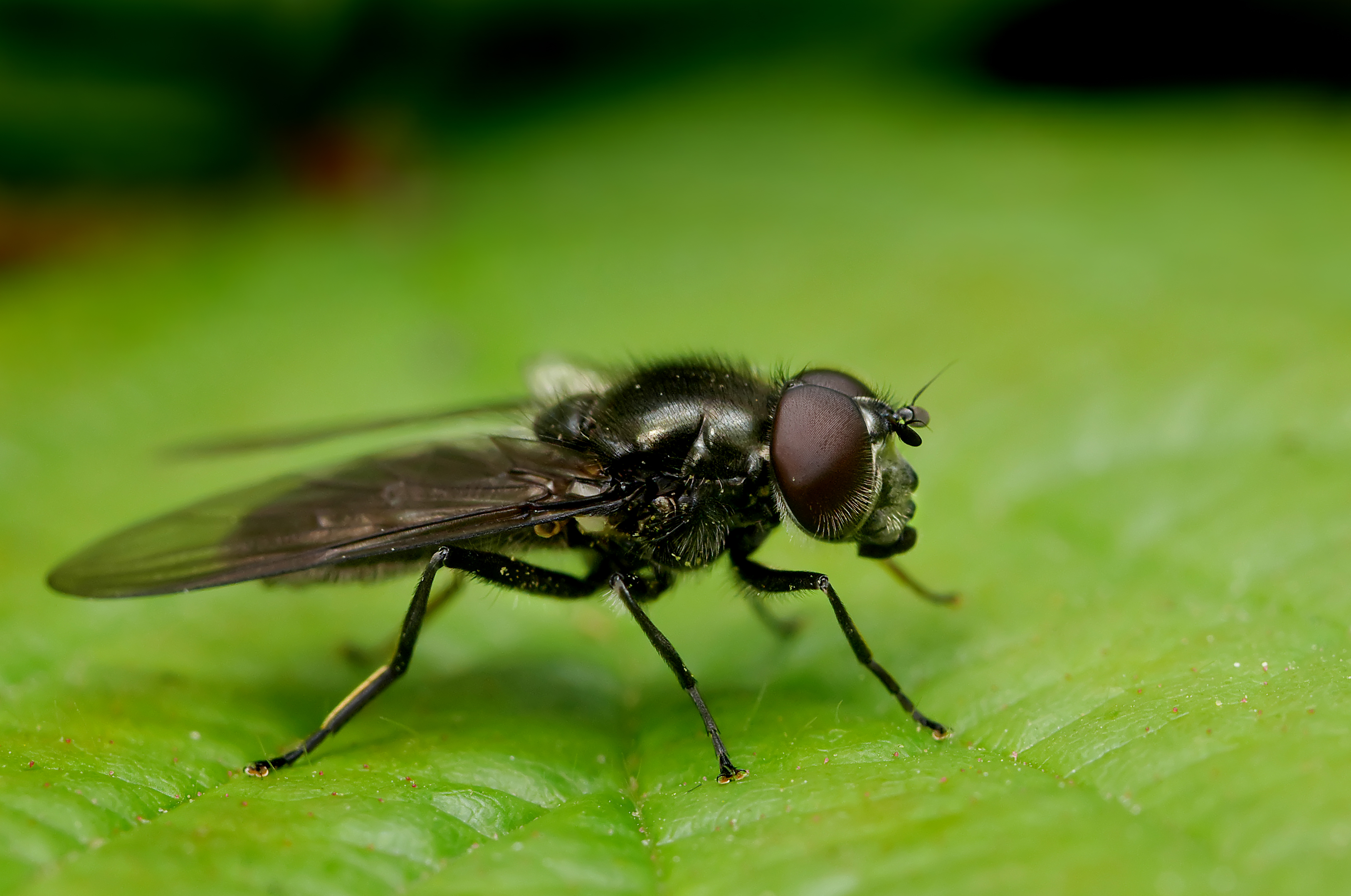
- Side view. Face showing projecting hairs on the sides

Scientific classification
- Kingdom: Animalia
- Phylum: Arthropoda
- Clade: Pancrustacea
- Class: Insecta
- Order: Diptera
- Family: Syrphidae
- Genus: Cheilosia
- Species: C. variabilis

Binomial name
- Cheilosia variabilis (Panzer, 1798)

Synonyms
- List: Cheilosia funebres (Harris, 1780); Cheilosia nigrina (Meigen, 1822); Musca funebres Harris, 1780; Syrphus nigrina Meigen, 1822; Syrphus variabilis Panzer, 1798

= Cheilosia variabilis =

Species of fly

Cheilosia variabilis, common name figwort cheilosia, is a species of hoverfly belonging to the family Syrphidae.

== Distribution ==
This species is native to the Palearctic realm, present in most of Europe eastwards to western Siberia, in the Near East, and in North Africa.

== Habitat ==
These hoverflies inhabit deciduous forest, from the Fagus, Picea zone to alluvial hardwood forest, tracksides and edges of clearings.

== Description ==
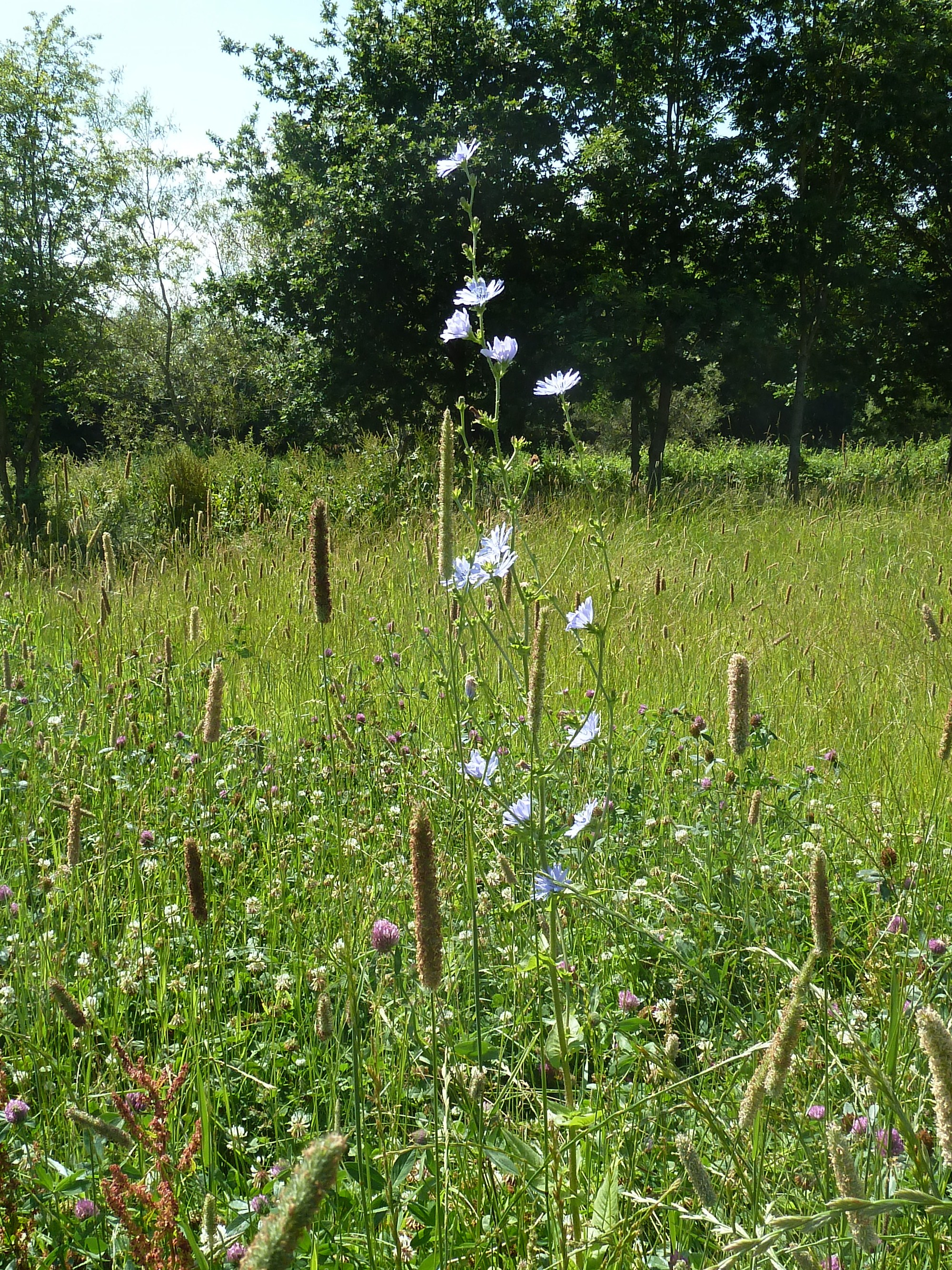
Habitat.Ireland.

For terms see Morphology of Diptera
Cheilosia variabilis can reach a body length of 10–25 millimetres (0.39–0.98 in) and a wing length of 9–12 mm. Like most Cheilosia this large species is blackish in color, causing it to sometimes be overlooked as a hoverfly. The face has outstanding hairs on the sides and a conspicuous central knob. Antennae are black or dark brown and hairs of arista are longer than the diameter of basal part. The thorax is black-haired, the abdomen is rather elongate and the tergites are pale yellow-haired. The wings are greyish and disproportionately long. Legs are entirely black. In males, the halteres are pale brown. The larva is figured by Dusek (1962).

This species is rather similar to Cheilosia lasiopa, Cheilosia vulpina and Cheilosia griseiventris.

on Scrophularia nodosa

== Biology ==
Adult hoverflies can be found from April to September in two generations per year, as this species is bivoltine. They visit flowers of white umbellifers, Aegopodium podagraria, Alliaria petiolata, Anthriscus sylvestris, Apiaceae, Aurinia saxatilis, Conium maculatum, Crataegus laevigata, Euphorbia cyparissias, Meum athamanticum, Potentilla reptans, Ranunculus repens, Salix spec., Sambucus nigra, Caltha, Cirsium, Galium, Scrophularia, Sorbus aucuparia.

The larvae are miners in the rhizomes of the common figwort (Scrophularia nodosa) (hence the common name) and in the stalks of the water figwort (Scrophularia auriculata).
