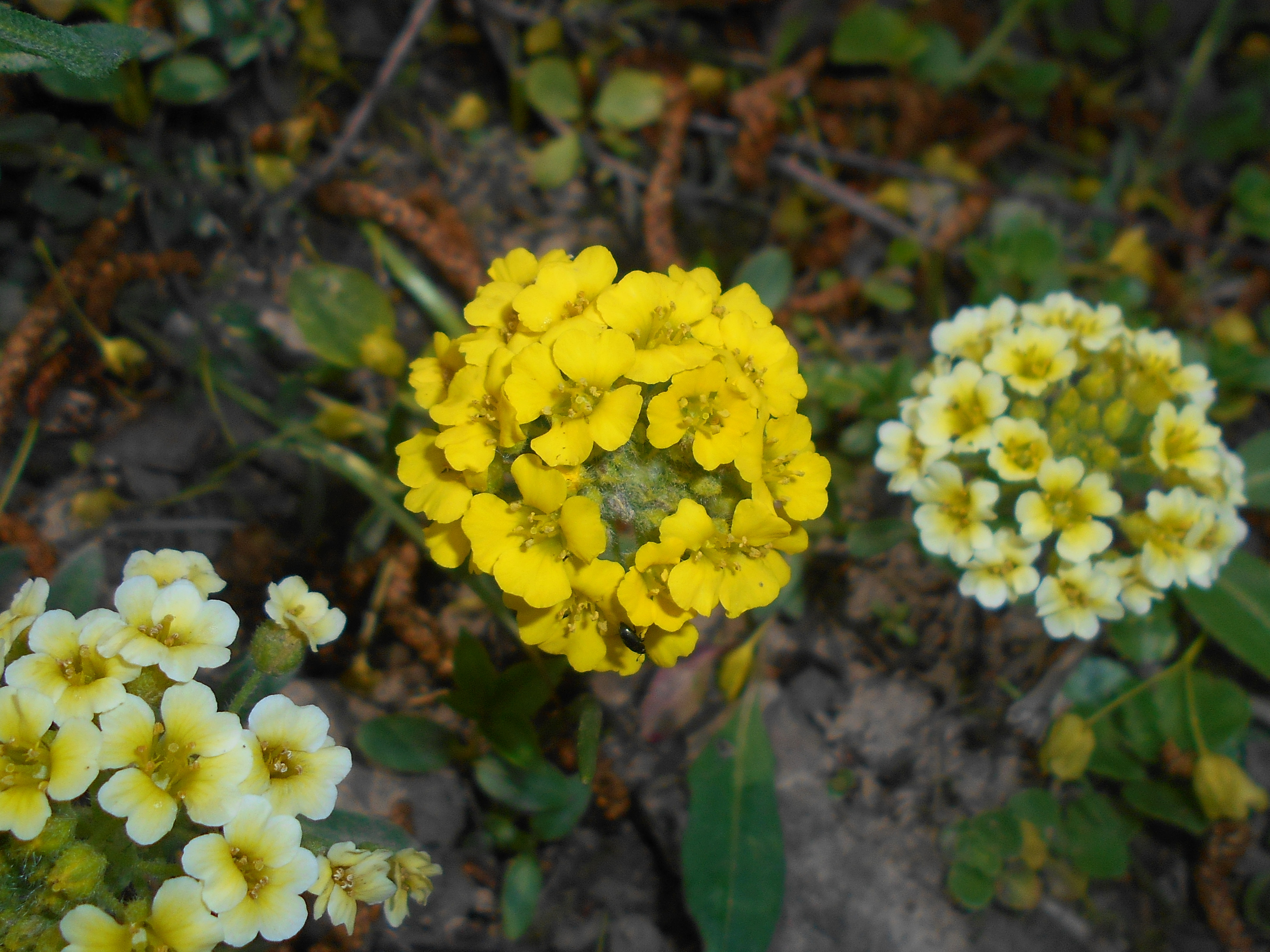
- At the Botanical Garden of Maria Curie-Skłodowska University
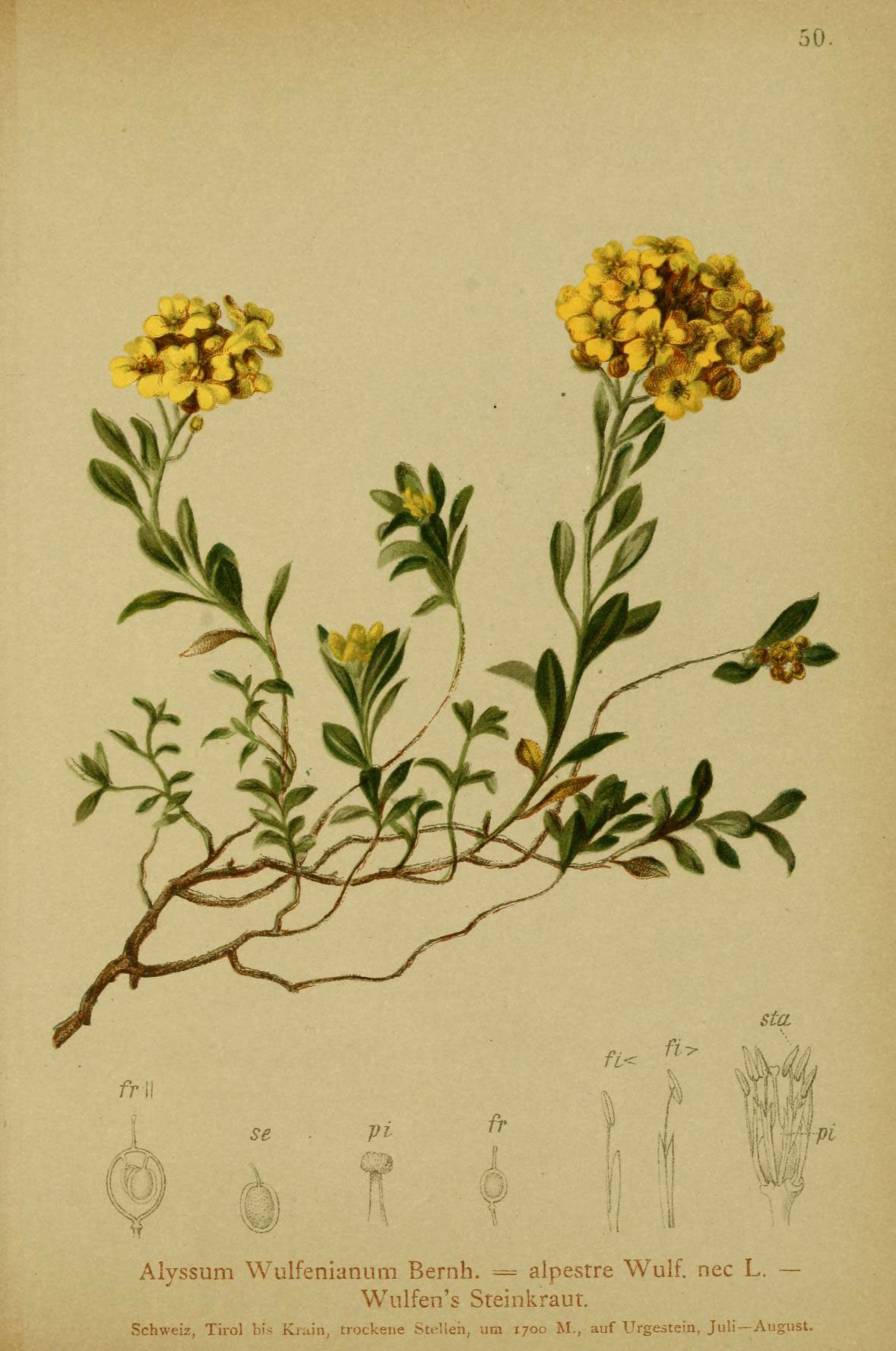
- Botanical illustration

Scientific classification
- Kingdom: Plantae
- Clade: Tracheophytes
- Clade: Angiosperms
- Clade: Eudicots
- Clade: Rosids
- Order: Brassicales
- Family: Brassicaceae
- Genus: Alyssum
- Species: A. wulfenianum

Binomial name
- Alyssum wulfenianum Willd.

Synonyms
- Adyseton montanum Scop.; Adyseton wulfenianum (Willd.) Sweet; Alyssum alpestre Wulfen ex Nyman; Alyssum heinzii Ullep.; Alyssum ovirense A.Kern.

= Alyssum wulfenianum =

Species of plant in the mustard family

Alyssum wulfenianum, the madwort (a name it shares with some of the other members of its genus), is a species of flowering plant in the family Brassicaceae, native to the southeastern Alps. Preferring dry, porous soils, it is hardy in USDA zones four through nine. There is a cultivar, 'Golden Spring'.

== Characteristics ==
The size of the plant can vary between 15 cm (5.9 inches) and 30 cm (12 inches). The leaves range in color from brown to a dark green. Flowers of the plant are typically bright yellow and have four petals. Soil that contains Alyssum wulfenianum has been shown to have increased zinc and lead as a result of the plant. It has a flowering period in the summer between May and June, and usually lacks hair on its stems. It was named after Austrian botanist and mineralogist Franz Xaver von Wulfan due to his research in the area.

== Subtaxa ==
The following subspecies are accepted:

- Alyssum wulfenianum subsp. ovirense (A.Kern.) Magauer, Schönsw. & Frajman – southeastern Alps
- Alyssum wulfenianum subsp. wulfenianum – southeastern Alps
