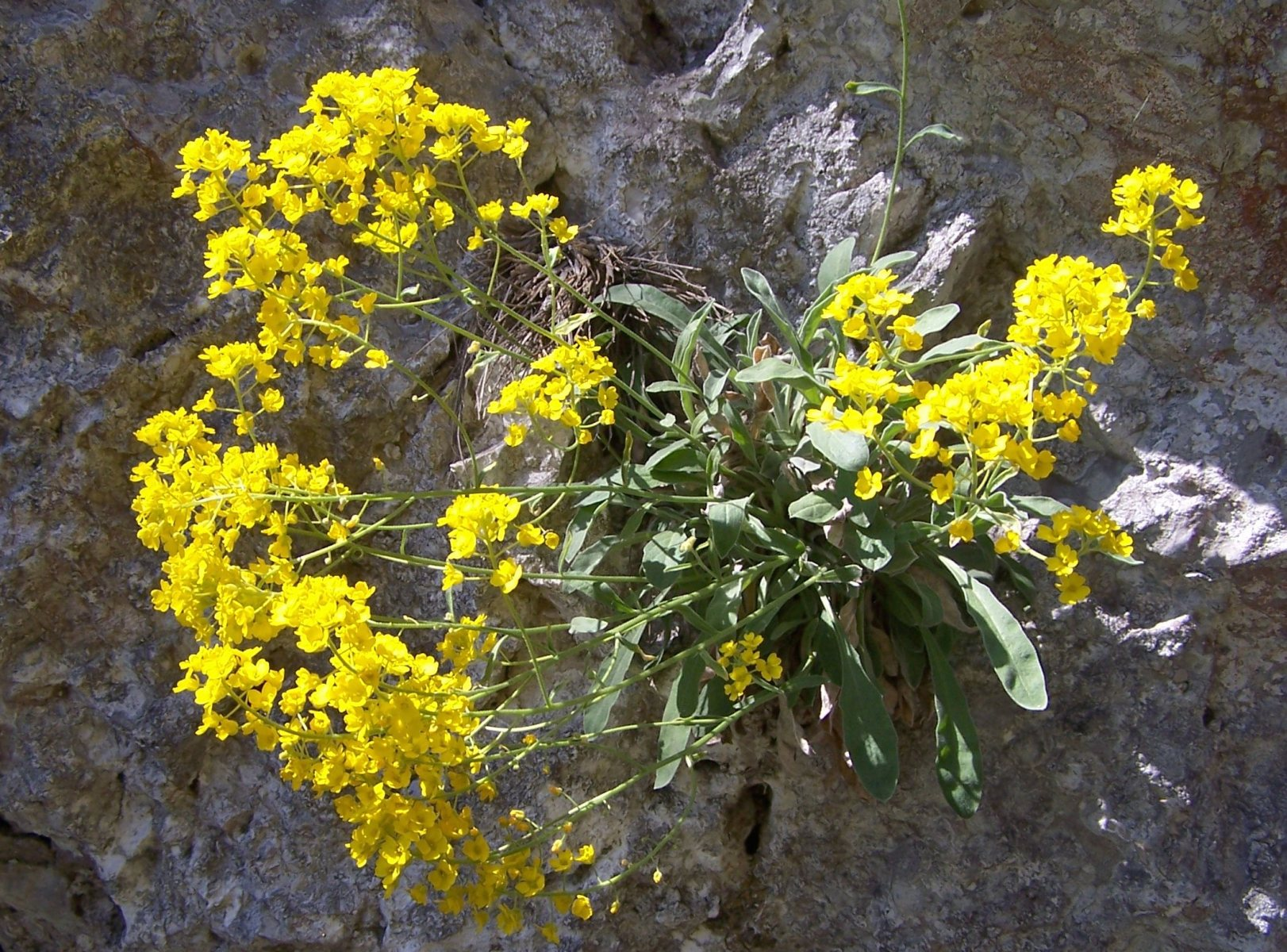
- Aurinia saxatilis

Scientific classification
- Kingdom: Plantae
- Clade: Tracheophytes
- Clade: Angiosperms
- Clade: Eudicots
- Clade: Rosids
- Order: Brassicales
- Family: Brassicaceae
- Genus: Aurinia (L.) Desv.

Synonyms
- Alyssanthus Trinajstić; Anodontea (DC.) Sweet

= Aurinia =

Genus of flowering plants

The gastropod genus Aurinia is nowadays usually considered a junior synonym of Scaphella.

Aurinia is a genus of flowering plants of the family Brassicaceae (Cruciferae), native to mountainous areas of central and southern Europe, Ukraine, southern European Russia, and Turkey. They are closely related to Alyssum, which they resemble. They can either be biennial or woody-based evergreen perennials. They produce panicles of yellow flowers in early summer.

== Species ==
Seven species are accepted.

- Aurinia corymbosa Griseb.
- Aurinia gionae (Quézel & Contandr.) Greuter & Burdet
- Aurinia leucadea (Guss.) K.Koch
- Aurinia moreana Tzanoud. & Iatroú
- Aurinia petraea (Ard.) Schur
- Aurinia saxatilis (L.) Desv.
- Aurinia sinuata (L.) Griseb.
