= Alyssum dagestanicum =

Dagestanian alyssum

Conservation status
- Least Concern (IUCN 3.1)

Scientific classification
- Kingdom: Plantae
- Clade: Tracheophytes
- Clade: Angiosperms
- Clade: Eudicots
- Clade: Rosids
- Order: Brassicales
- Family: Brassicaceae
- Genus: Alyssum
- Species: A. dagestanicum

Binomial name
- Alyssum dagestanicum Rupr.

Species of flowering plant

Alyssum dagestanicum, the Dagestanian alyssum, is a species in the family Brassicaceae that is native to Russia and the Caucasus Mountains. It occurs in rocky xerophyte communities in the middle montane zone. It is threatened by grazing and cropland development.
