= Alyssum artvinense =

Conservation status
- Endangered (IUCN 3.1)

Scientific classification
- Kingdom: Plantae
- Clade: Tracheophytes
- Clade: Angiosperms
- Clade: Eudicots
- Clade: Rosids
- Order: Brassicales
- Family: Brassicaceae
- Genus: Alyssum
- Species: A. artvinense

Binomial name
- Alyssum artvinense N.Busch

Species of flowering plant

Alyssum artvinense, the Artvinian alyssum, is a species in the family Brassicaceae that is endemic to only five locations in Erzurum Province and Artvin Province in northeastern Turkey. It is a subshrub which can be found on igneous rocky and stony slopes, in forest clearings, at elevations of 320 to 1,850 m. It is threatened by habitat loss and habitat degradation from dams, roads and erosion.
