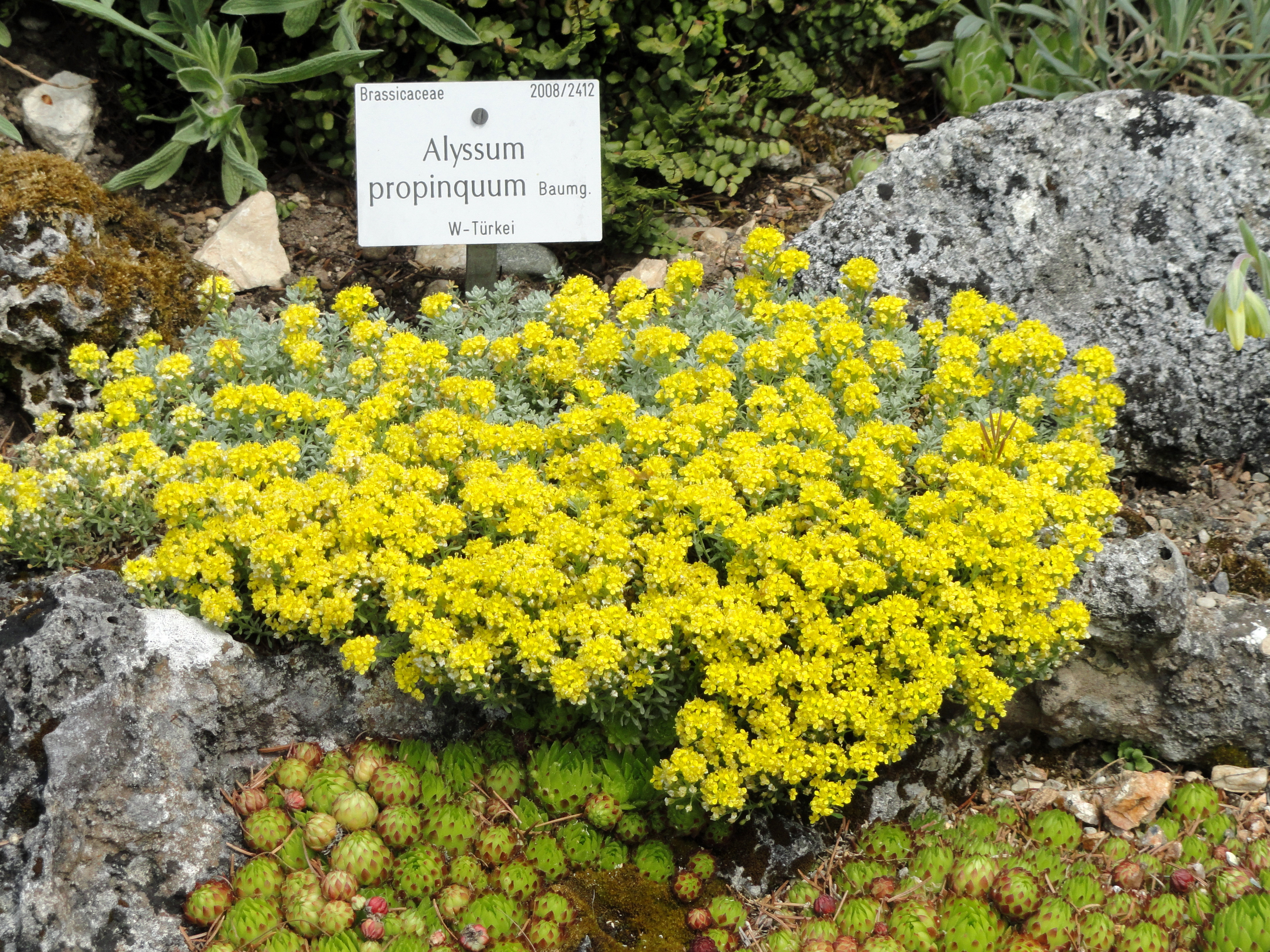
- At the Botanical Garden Munich-Nymphenburg

Scientific classification
- Kingdom: Plantae
- Clade: Tracheophytes
- Clade: Angiosperms
- Clade: Eudicots
- Clade: Rosids
- Order: Brassicales
- Family: Brassicaceae
- Genus: Alyssum
- Species: A. propinquum

Binomial name
- Alyssum propinquum Baumg.

= Alyssum propinquum =

Species of plant

Alyssum propinquum is a species of flowering plant in the family Brassicaceae native to southern Turkey. Typically 7.5 cm (3 in) tall and spreading to 30 cm (12 in) wide, it is hardy in USDA zones 7 through 10 and is recommended for rock gardens.
