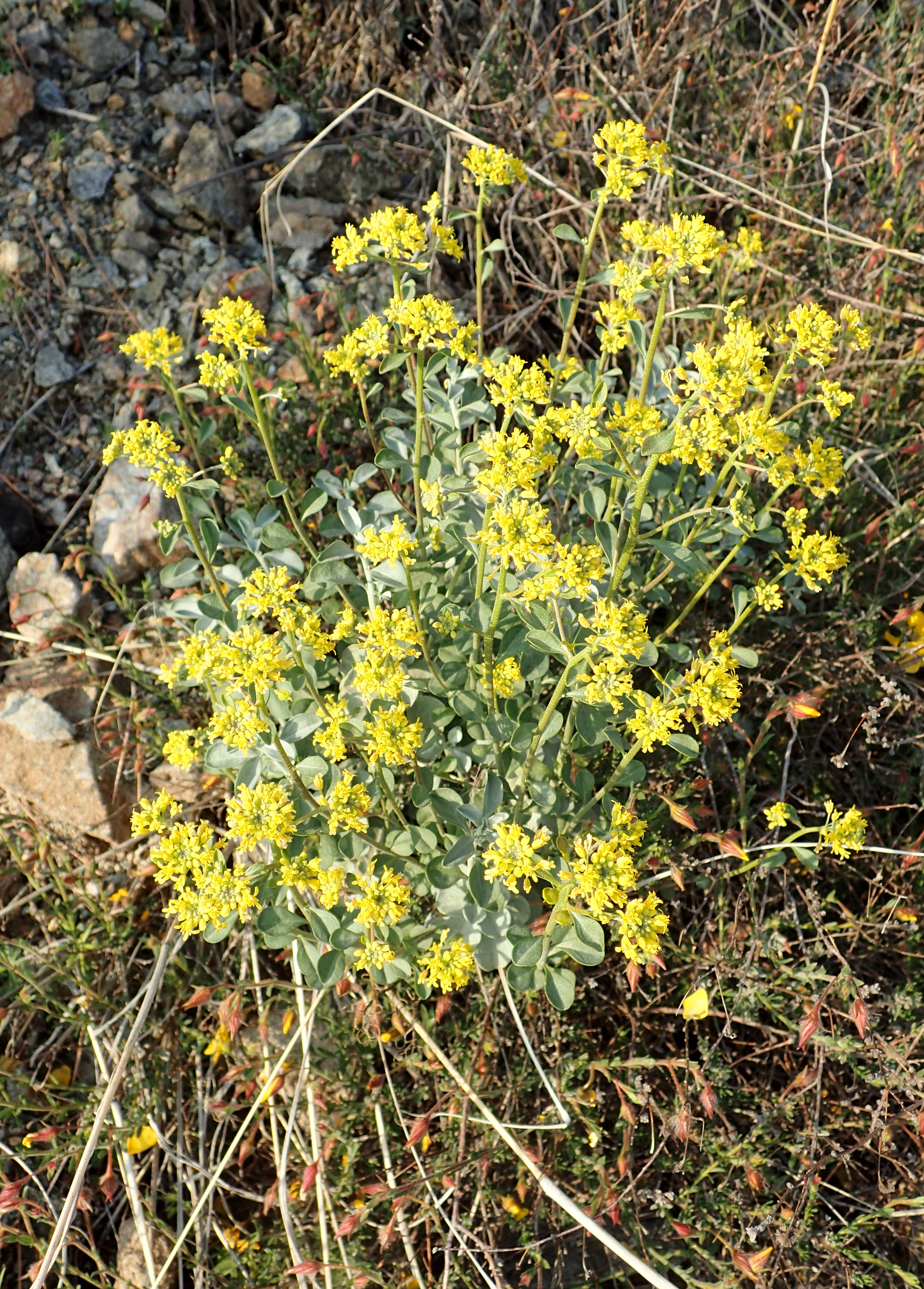

Scientific classification
- Kingdom: Plantae
- Clade: Tracheophytes
- Clade: Angiosperms
- Clade: Eudicots
- Clade: Rosids
- Order: Brassicales
- Family: Brassicaceae
- Genus: Odontarrhena
- Species: O. chondrogyna

Binomial name
- Odontarrhena chondrogyna (B.L. Burtt) Španiel & al.

= Odontarrhena chondrogyna =

Species of flowering plant

Odontarrhena chondrogyna is a species of perennial flowering plants in the family Brassicaceae. It was previously included in the genus Alyssum, and hence named Alyssum chondrogynum, but was assigned to the newly established Odontarrhena after molecular phylogeny studies from the 2010s. It is endemic to the island of Cyprus, where it grows on rocky serpentinised slopes.

== Description ==
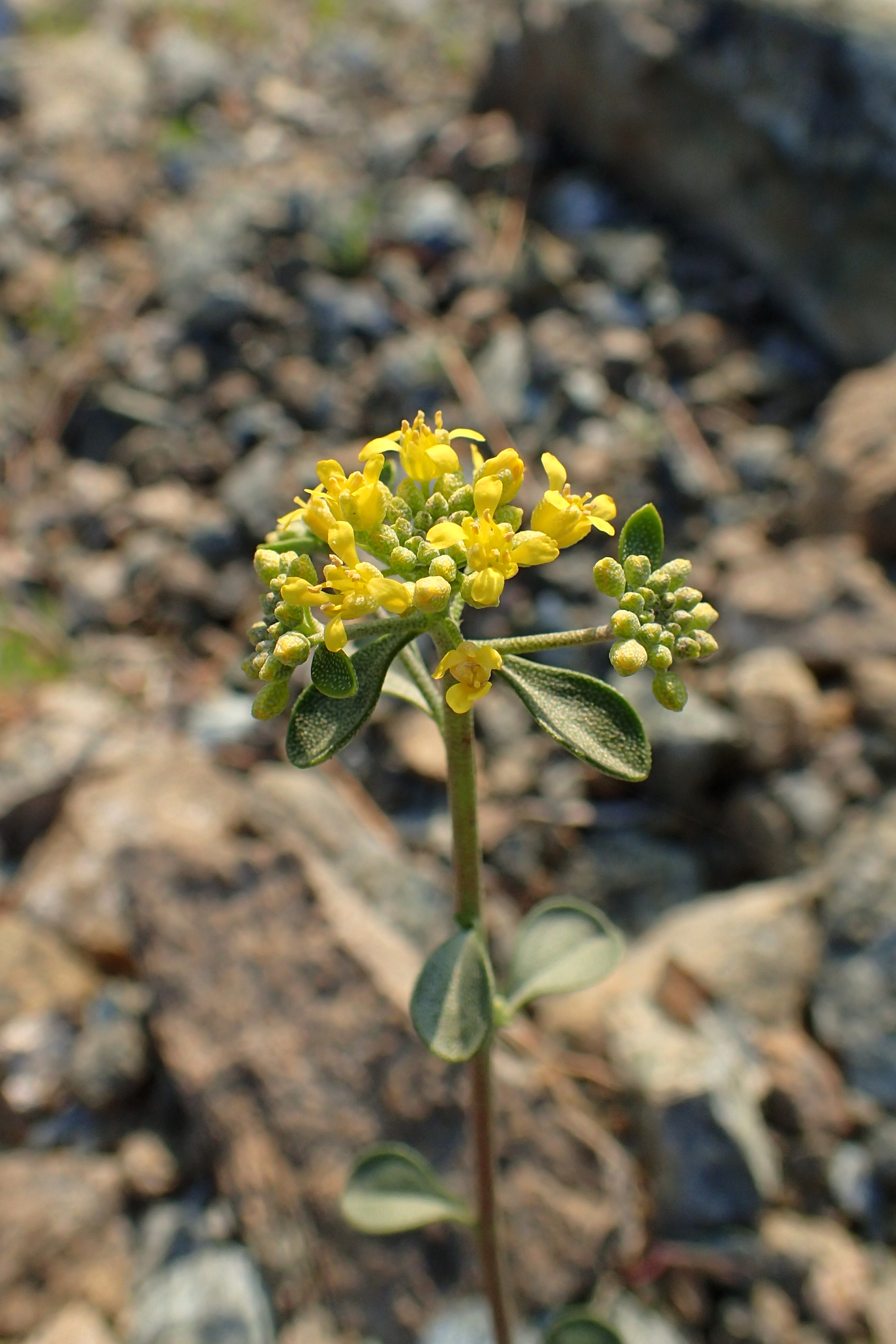

The plant is a much branched subshrub with suberect, woody-at-base, stems, 20–50 cm high. Leaves alternate, simple, entire, grey-green, thick, obovoid to suborbicular, 8-16 x 7–13 mm, with short stellate hairs. Flowers actinomorphic, in terminal corymbose inflorescences, golden yellow, with 4 petals and sepals. Flowers April–June. Fruit an obovoid silicle with short stellate hairs.

== Distribution ==
It is only found in the Limassol Forest of Cyprus at 200–700 m altitudes where it is locally common: Kakomallis, Eloros, Kyparishia, Yerasa, Kellaki, Sanidha and Listovounos Forest.
