= Alyssum pulvinare =

Scientific classification
- Kingdom: Plantae
- Clade: Tracheophytes
- Clade: Angiosperms
- Clade: Eudicots
- Clade: Rosids
- Order: Brassicales
- Family: Brassicaceae
- Genus: Alyssum
- Species: A. pulvinare

Binomial name
- Alyssum pulvinare Velen.

Species of flowering plant

Alyssum pulvinare is a species of madwort, a flowering plant in the family Brassicaceae. A perennial herbaceous plant native to the Balkans, it grows on rocky places, rock ledges and dry grassy slopes, forming tufts about 6–15 cm high. It flowers in May and June.

The plant is found on Mount Oeta of central Greece (from the lower montane level up to 2100 m), conjectured to be present in northern Greece, reported from the south of the Republic of North Macedonia (including the mountain of Tzena or Kožuf between the two countries), the Iron Gates of southwestern Romania, and Bulgaria: at lower elevations (less than 900 m) in scattered localities in Kraishte, the middle Rhodopes, eastern Sredna Gora and the north-east of the country.

Alyssum thracicum Velen. is treated as a synonym by most, though not all, sources. Alyssum mildeanum Podp. is also commonly included as a synonym, although in some sources it is instead assigned to A. stribrnyi.
