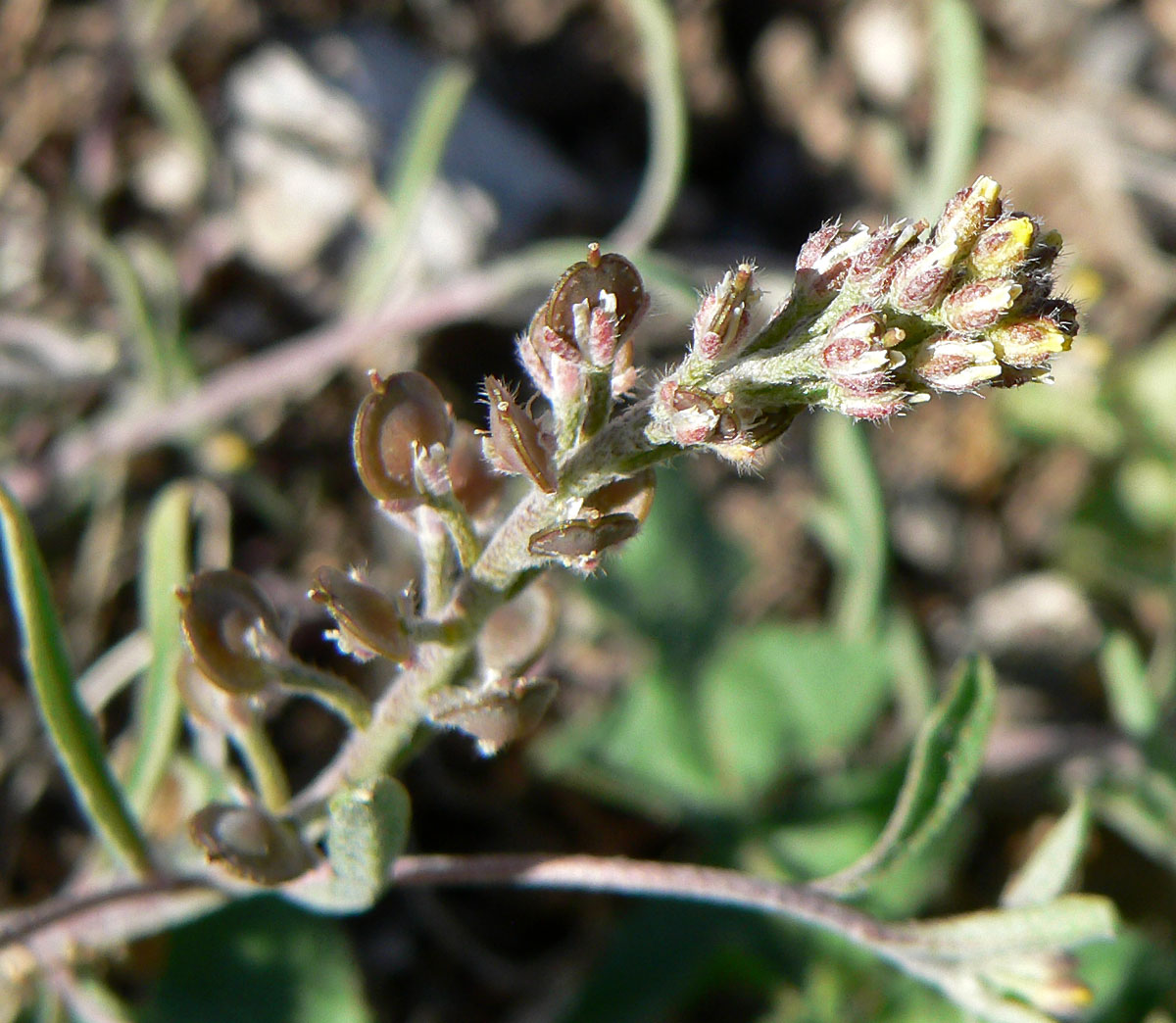
- var. desertorum in southern Nevada

Scientific classification
- Kingdom: Plantae
- Clade: Tracheophytes
- Clade: Angiosperms
- Clade: Eudicots
- Clade: Rosids
- Order: Brassicales
- Family: Brassicaceae
- Genus: Alyssum
- Species: A. desertorum

Binomial name
- Alyssum desertorum Stapf

Synonyms
- Alyssum minimum Willd. nom. illeg.; Alyssum sartorii Heldr. ex Maire & Petitm.; Psilonema minimum Schur

= Alyssum desertorum =

Species of flowering plant

Alyssum desertorum is a species of flowering plant in the family Brassicaceae known by the common name desert madwort. It is native to Europe, North Africa and Asia, and it is found in parts of western North America as an introduced species and sometimes a weed. This is a hairy annual herb producing upright stems up to about 20 centimeters tall. The leaves are linear to oblanceolate-linear in shape, 0.5-4 millimeters long and 0.3-3 millimeters wide. The entire plant is covered by 8-20 rayed stellate trichomes, giving the plant a grayish appearance. It produces small yellowish flowers with petals that are 2-2.5 millimeters long and round, notched fruits 2.5-4.5 millimeters long. The brown seeds are winged, arranged two to a locule, and are about 1.5 millimeters long.

Pronghorn antelope eat this plant in the winter. Western harvester ants have been recorded harvesting the seeds in Wyoming.
