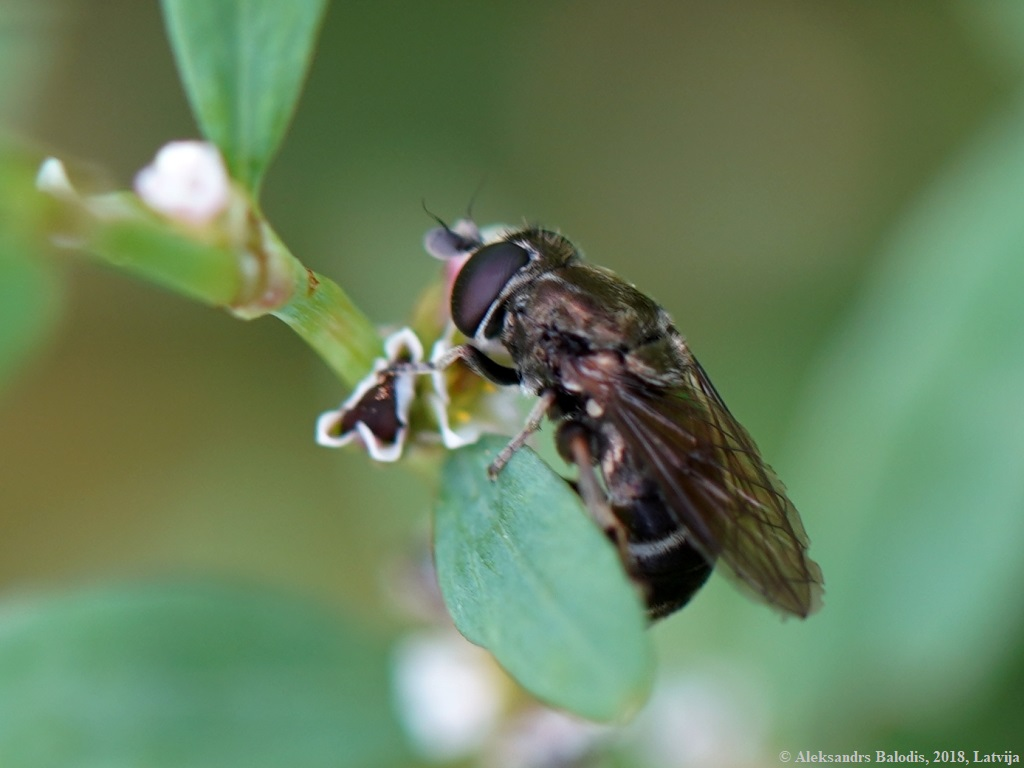

Scientific classification
- Kingdom: Animalia
- Phylum: Arthropoda
- Clade: Pancrustacea
- Class: Insecta
- Order: Diptera
- Family: Syrphidae
- Genus: Cheilosia
- Species: C. vulpina

Binomial name
- Cheilosia vulpina (Meigen, 1822)

Synonyms
- Cheilosia pigra Loew, 1840; Chilosia conops Becker, 1894

= Cheilosia vulpina =

Species of fly

Cheilosia vulpina is a Palearctic hoverfly.

== Description ==
Very similar to Cheilosia variabilis For identification see references.

== Distribution and biology ==
From Denmark to the Pyrenees and north Spain; from England eastwards through Central Europe to central and southern parts of Russia, then Central Asia and as far east as western Siberia. . The habitat is open coniferous and deciduous woodland, and grassland, pasture the altitude of Picea forest. Flowers visited include white Umbelliferae, Heracleum, Chaerophyllum, Bellis, Galium, Ranunculus Flies April to September. The larva feeds on the roots of Cynara scolymus.
