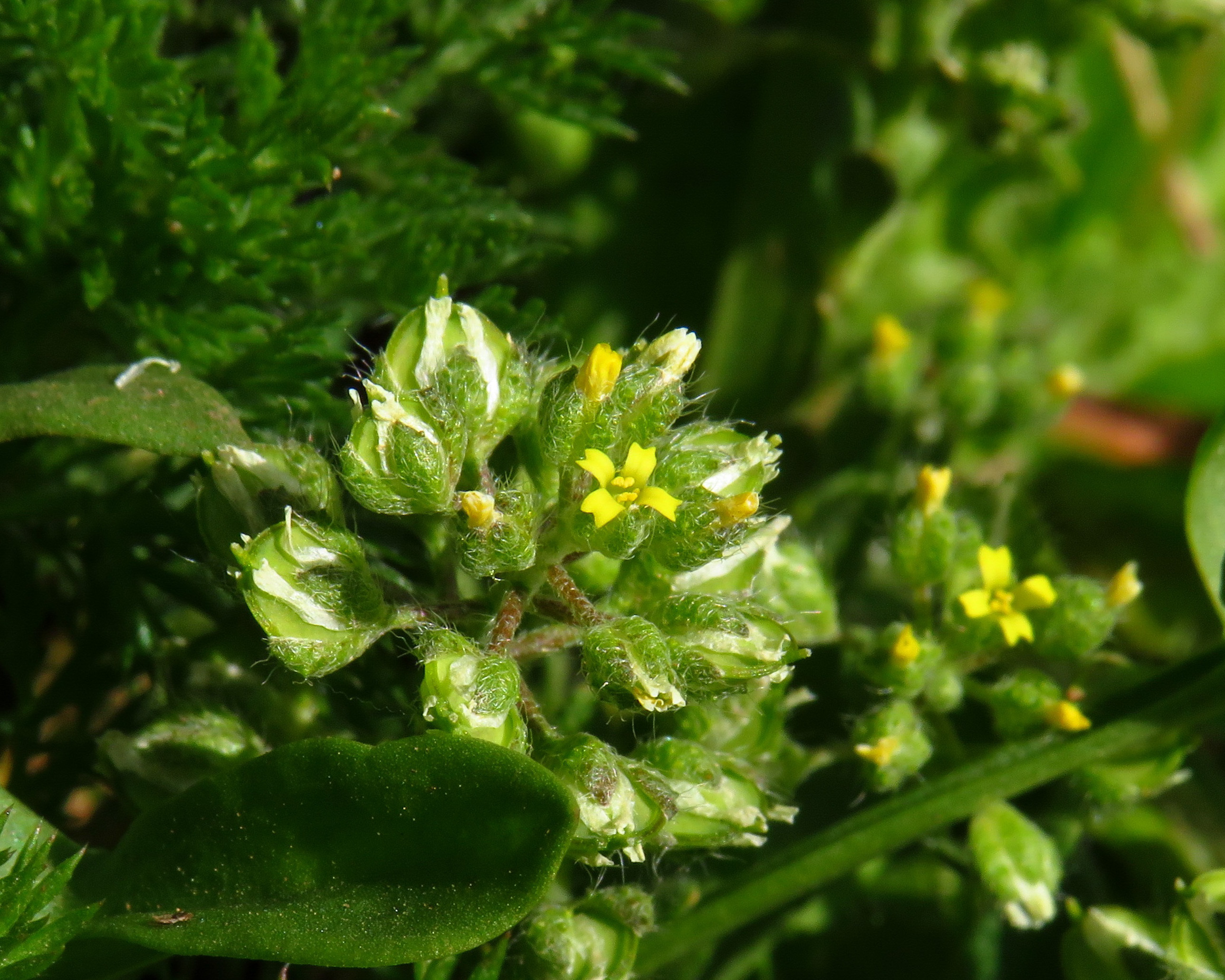

Scientific classification
- Kingdom: Plantae
- Clade: Embryophytes
- Clade: Tracheophytes
- Clade: Spermatophytes
- Clade: Angiosperms
- Clade: Eudicots
- Clade: Rosids
- Order: Brassicales
- Family: Brassicaceae
- Genus: Alyssum
- Species: A. minutum

Binomial name
- Alyssum minutum Schltdl. ex DC.

Synonyms
- Alyssum argaeum Bornm.; Alyssum compactum De Not. ex Ces.; Alyssum marginatum Timb.-Lagr. & Jeanb.; Alyssum minutum subsp. moesiacum Velen.; Alyssum minutum var. condensatum Post; Alyssum ponticum Velen.; Alyssum potemkinii Akinf. ex Schmalh.; Alyssum psilocarpum Boiss.

= Alyssum minutum =

Species of flowering plant

Alyssum minutum is a species of flowering plant in the genus Alyssum, family Brassicaceae, native to the Mediterranean and Eastern Europe.

An annual herbaceous plant, typically reaching a size of 5–10 cm, it grows on gravelly soil, rocky slopes and dry grassland. It flowers from March until early summer. Its chromosome number is 2n=16.

== Distribution ==
The plant is found in scattered locations on the Iberian Peninsula (at elevations of 1,000–2,000 m in the Baetic System and in the central and northwestern parts of the peninsula), Italy (Sardinia, Sicily and Calabria), Greece (throughout the mainland, Crete, Lesbos and some of the larger islands; at elevations of 500–1,900 m, rarely as low as sea level or as high as 2,200 m), in southern Albania, North Macedonia, southeastern Serbia, Bulgaria (in the Upper Thracian Plain and the north-east), in eastern Romania, northern Moldova, in Ukraine (especially in the Black Sea Lowland and in Crimea), western and central Turkey, in Cyprus, West Syria, Lebanon, Egypt and Morocco. It was reported as present in the Caucasus by the 1939 Flora of USSR, but this is not mentioned in the other sources cited here.
