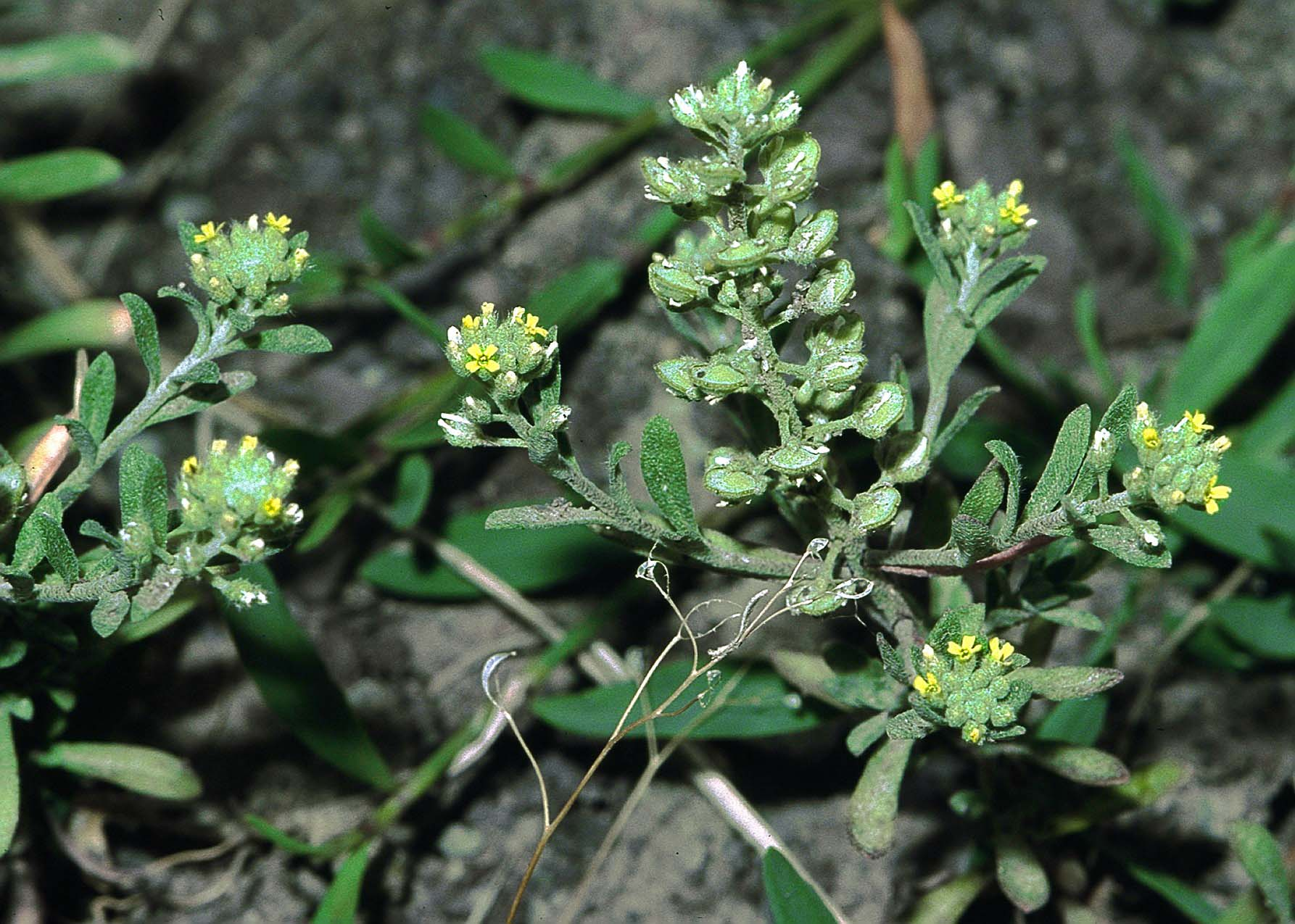

Scientific classification
- Kingdom: Plantae
- Clade: Tracheophytes
- Clade: Angiosperms
- Clade: Eudicots
- Clade: Rosids
- Order: Brassicales
- Family: Brassicaceae
- Genus: Alyssum
- Species: A. alyssoides

Binomial name
- Alyssum alyssoides L.

Synonyms
- List: Adyseton alyssoides (L.) Nieuwl.; Adyseton calycinum Scop.; Adyseton campestre Moench; Adyseton mutabile Moench; Alyssum alsinifolium Host; Alyssum arvaticum Jord.; Alyssum calicinum Neck.; Alyssum calycinum Haens. ex Nyman; Alyssum calycinum L. nom. illeg.; Alyssum campestre (L.) L.; Alyssum campestre Hoffm.; Alyssum conglobatum Fil. & Jáv.; Alyssum erraticum Jord.; Alyssum lusitanicum Brot. ex Nyman; Alyssum montanum Brot.; Alyssum parviflorum Schloss. ex Nyman; Alyssum phymatocarpum Schloss. & Vuk.; Alyssum polyodon Boiss. & Bushe; Alyssum ruderale Jord.; Alyssum sabulosum Jord.; Alyssum schlosseri Heuff. ex Schloss. & Vuk.; Alyssum sublineare Jord.; Alyssum vagum Jord.; Clypeola alyssoides L.; Clypeola calycina All. ex Steud.; Clypeola campestris L.; Clypeola minor L. nom. inval.; Crucifera alyssoides E.H.L.Krause; Crucifera calycina E.H.L.Krause; Psilonema alyssoides (L.) Heidemann; Psilonema calycinum (L.) C.A. Mey.; Psilonema campestre (L.) Schur

= Alyssum alyssoides =

Species of flowering plant in the cabbage family

Alyssum alyssoides is a species of flowering plant in the mustard family known by several common names, including pale madwort and yellow alyssum. It is native to Eurasia, but it can be found throughout much of the temperate world as an introduced species and sometimes a common weed. For example, it has been noted as a weed in the western United States. It often appears in arable fields, sandy tracks, pits, and docks.

== Description ==
This is a hairy annual or biennial herb producing stems which grow upright or lie along the ground to a maximum length of 30 to 40 centimeters (12 to 16 in). It produces yellow flowers May–July that fade to white with four small petals about 1.5–3 mm long. The fruit is a round, hairy capsule up to half a centimeter long. The hairs are branched, often stellate (star shaped). The seeds are tiny, 1–2 mm long, with minuscule wings. The leaves are simple, narrowly oblanceolate or linear with smooth margins, and are alternately arranged.
