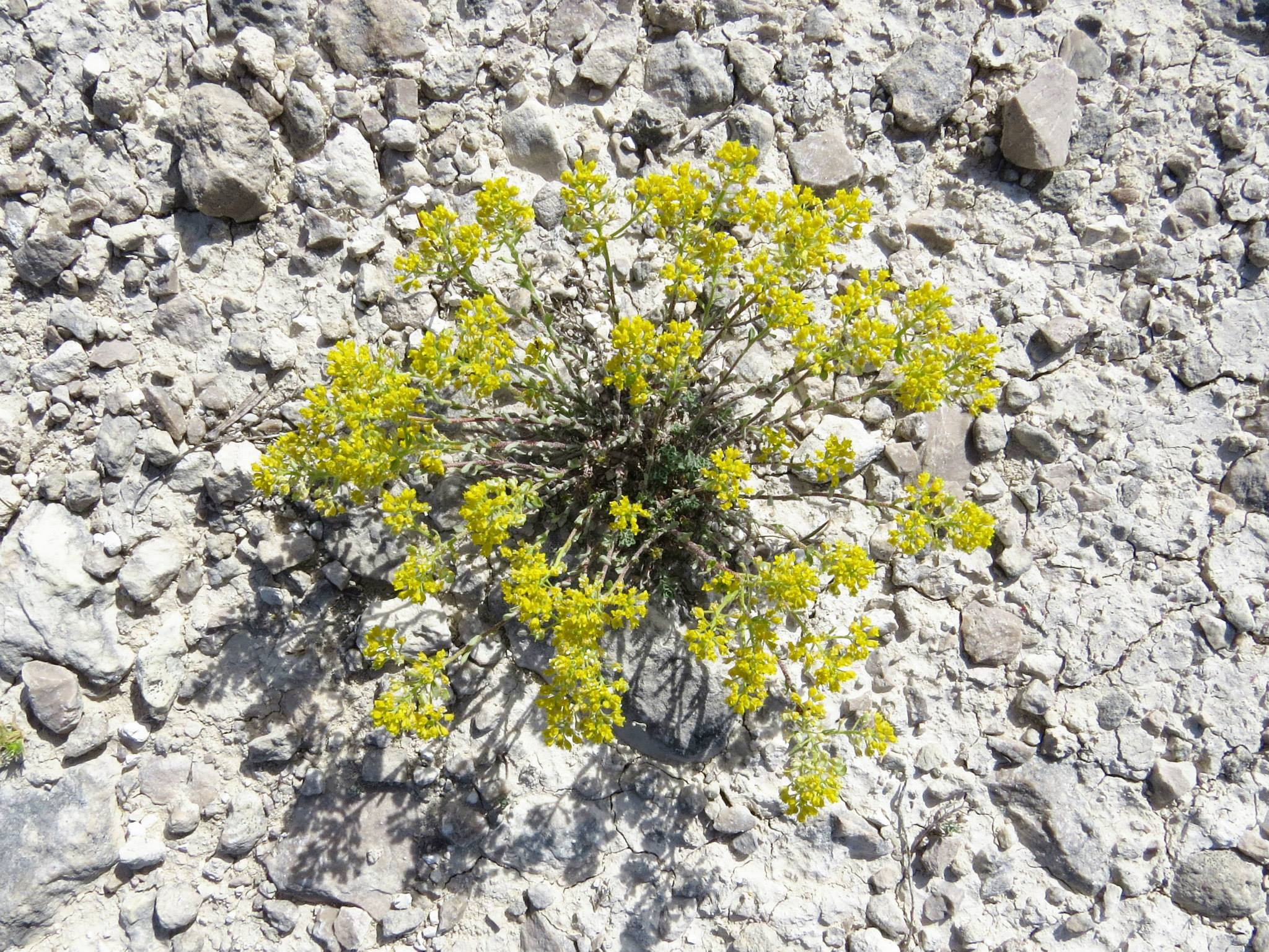
- Near Madrid, Spain

Scientific classification
- Kingdom: Plantae
- Clade: Tracheophytes
- Clade: Angiosperms
- Clade: Eudicots
- Clade: Rosids
- Order: Brassicales
- Family: Brassicaceae
- Genus: Alyssum
- Species: A. serpyllifolium

Binomial name
- Alyssum serpyllifolium Desf.

Synonyms
- List: Adyseton nebrodense Sweet; Adyseton serpyllifolium (Desf.) Sweet; Alyssum castellanum Bourg. ex Nyman; Alyssum djurdjurae Chabert; Alyssum granatense Nyman; Alyssum malacitanum (Rivas Goday) T.R.Dudley; Alyssum murcicum Jord. ex Nyman; Alyssum pintodasilvae T.R.Dudley; Alyssum serpyllifolium subsp. malacitanum Rivas Goday; Meniocus serpyllifolius (Desf.) Desv.; Odontarrhena pyrenaica Jord. & Fourr.

= Alyssum serpyllifolium =

Species of plant in the mustard family

Alyssum serpyllifolium, the thyme-leaved alison, is a species of flowering plant in the family Brassicaceae, native to the western Mediterranean region. It is adapted to serpentine soils. The Royal Horticultural Society recommends it for rock gardens.

== Description ==
The flower color is yellow with green stems. It consists of lance-shaped leaves and requires dry soil and drained areas. This plant is often used to help observe the relationship between hyperaccumulating plants which store and absorb metals in their tissues, vs. non-hyperaccumulating plants. If soil is contaminated with high concentrations of metals this is likely because of mineral rock weathering or as a result of industrialization. The discovery of the plant's abilities has led to an easier process of detoxification of plant soil caused by mineral rock weathering or industrialization.

== Distribution ==
It is from the family Brassicaceae and is found in southwestern Europe. Alyssum serpyllifolium is mainly found in the Iberian Peninsula, Northeastern Portugal, and Spain.

== Phytoremediation ==
One of the features that this plant developed was used to help it adapt to its soil which contains a high concentration of metals. It is considered to be a metal hyperaccumulator (plants that can tolerate high amounts of metal within their system). This plant was used in a phytoremediation experiment to absorb the metal contaminated soil. A form of phytoremediation is known as phytoextraction, which removes the metals from the contaminated soil by absorbing the metals through the roots. It has the ability to uptake a high concentration of metals. This species of plant is a nickel hyperaccumulator, it mainly absorbs high levels of nickel because of the ultramafic rock found in its environment.
