= Odontarrhena libanotica =

Scientific classification
- Kingdom: Plantae
- Clade: Tracheophytes
- Clade: Angiosperms
- Clade: Eudicots
- Clade: Rosids
- Order: Brassicales
- Family: Brassicaceae
- Genus: Odontarrhena
- Species: O. libanotica

Binomial name
- Odontarrhena libanotica (Nyár.) Španiel, Al-Shehbaz, D.A.German & Marhold

Synonyms
- Alyssum libanoticum Nyár.

Species of flowering plant

Odontarrhena libanotica is a species of flowering plant in the family Brassicaceae (the mustard family), native to Lebanon and Syria.

== Distribution and habitat ==
Odontarrhena libanotica is native to Lebanon and Syria. It typically grows on rocky slopes, screes, and alpine meadows, particularly on calcareous soils within the Mount Lebanon and Anti-Lebanon mountain ranges.
