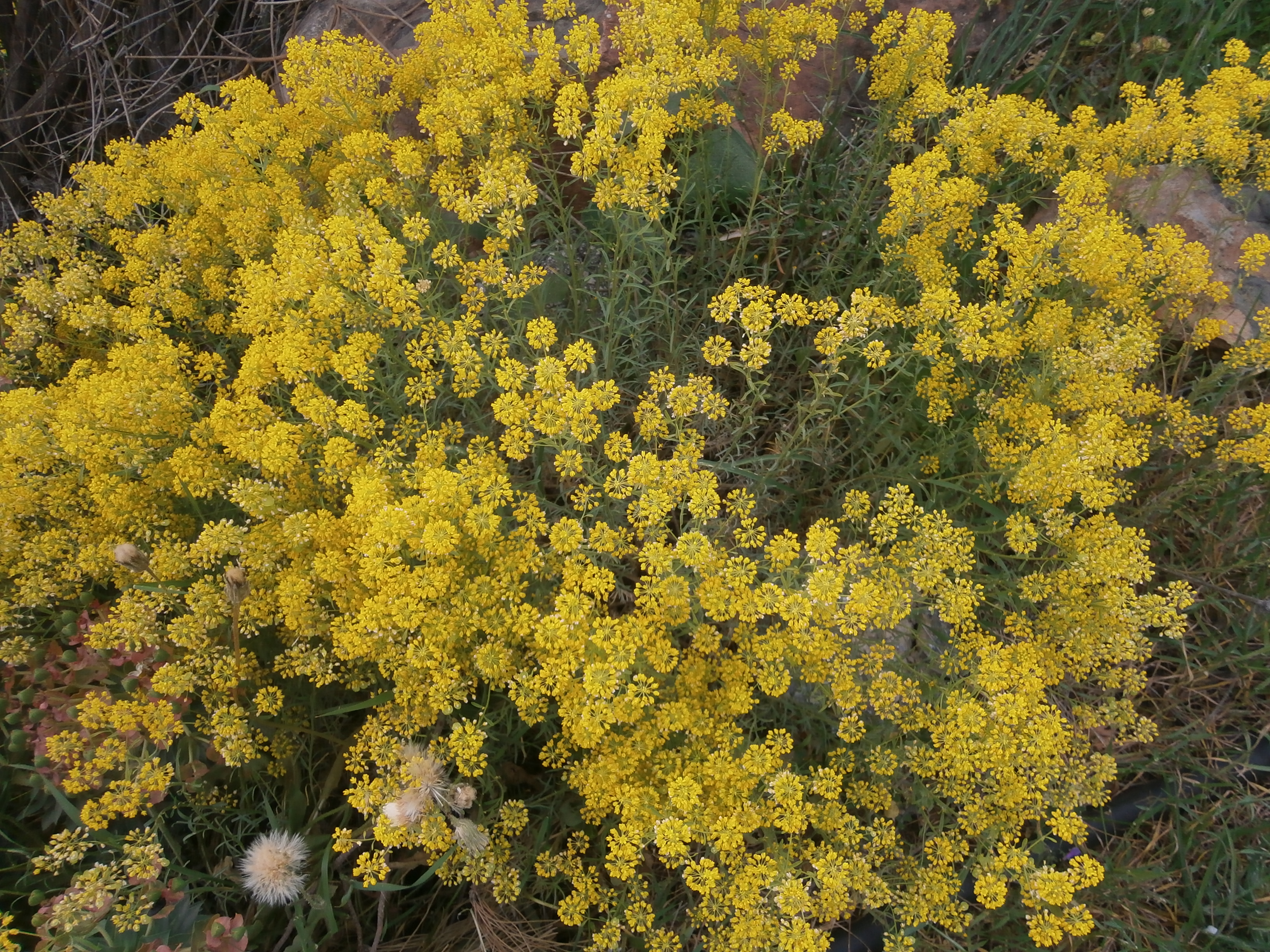

Scientific classification
- Kingdom: Plantae
- Clade: Embryophytes
- Clade: Tracheophytes
- Clade: Spermatophytes
- Clade: Angiosperms
- Clade: Eudicots
- Clade: Rosids
- Order: Brassicales
- Family: Brassicaceae
- Genus: Odontarrhena
- Species: O. lesbiaca

Binomial name
- Odontarrhena lesbiaca P. Candargy

Synonyms
- Alyssum lesbiacum (Candargy) Rech.f.

= Odontarrhena lesbiaca =

Species of flowering plant

Odontarrhena lesbiaca, syn. Alyssum lesbiacum, is a species of flowering plant in the family Brassicaceae. It is native only to the East Aegean Islands, such as Lesbos, Rhodes or Samos.

== Taxonomy ==
The species was first described by Paléologos C. Candargy in 1897 under its current accepted binomial name.

=== Etymology ===
The Latin specific epithet lesbiaca means "Lesbian", which references its native occurrence on the Greek island of Lesbos.
