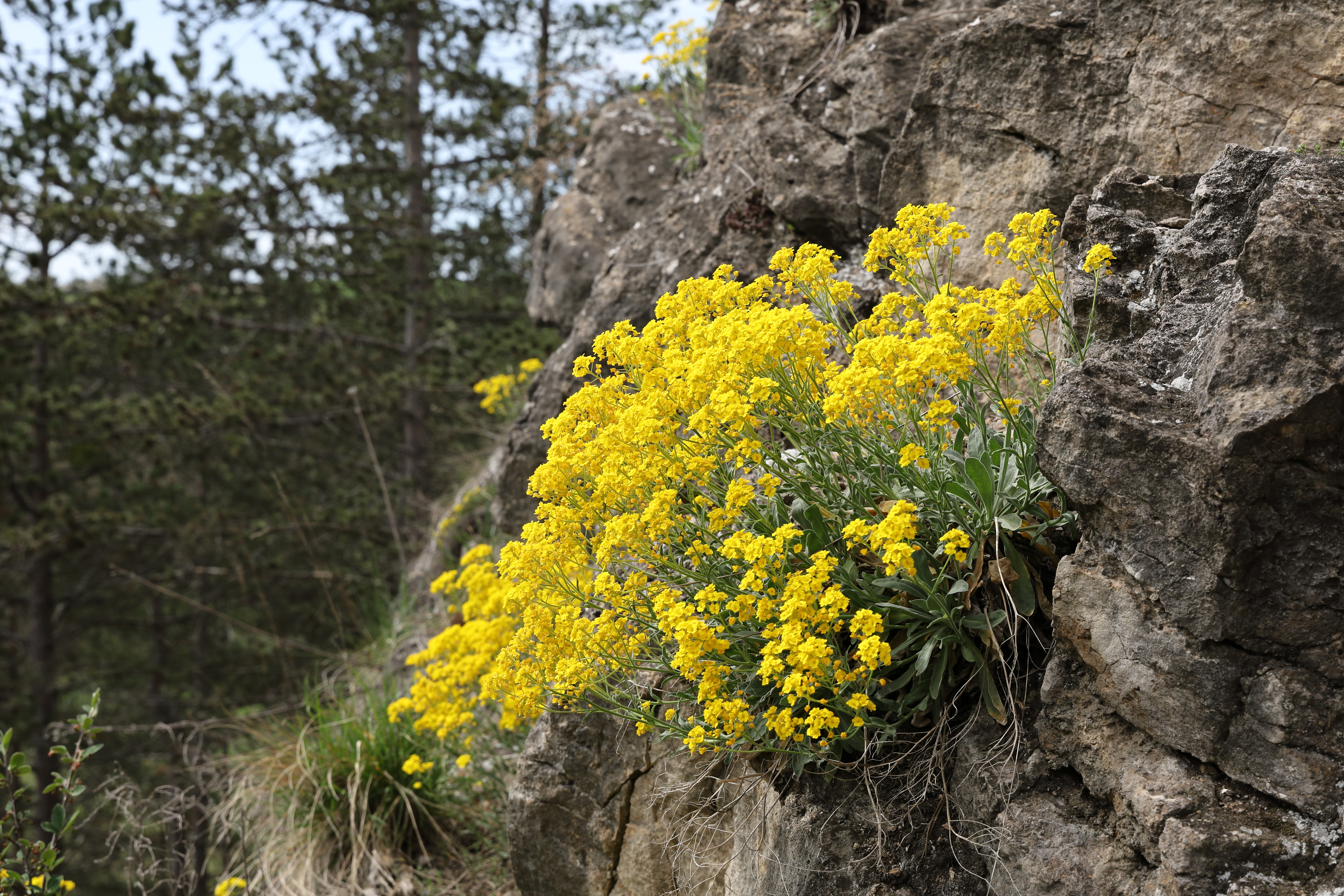

Scientific classification
- Kingdom: Plantae
- Clade: Tracheophytes
- Clade: Angiosperms
- Clade: Eudicots
- Clade: Rosids
- Order: Brassicales
- Family: Brassicaceae
- Genus: Aurinia
- Species: A. saxatilis

Binomial name
- Aurinia saxatilis (L.) Desv.

Synonyms
- Alyssum saxatile L.; Alyssum saxatile var. compactum

= Aurinia saxatilis =

Species of flowering plant

Aurinia saxatilis (syns Alyssum saxatile, Alyssum saxatile var. compactum) is an ornamental plant native to Asia and Europe.

== Common names ==
Some of the common names reflect its close relationship and resemblance to species of Alyssum. Common names include basket of gold, goldentuft alyssum, golden alyssum, golden alison, gold-dust, golden-tuft alyssum, golden-tuft madwort, rock madwort.

== Description ==
This is a little, rounded, evergreen perennial that can grow from 4 to 12in high, forming a mound up to 16-20in across. The flowers are clear yellow, but the various cultivars produce flowers in white, cream, lemon, peach or gold.

== Cultivation ==
Since its natural habitat is rocky, mountainous country, it is ideal for a rock garden, for dry, sloping ground, or for edging garden beds, provided the drainage is excellent. It is also ideally suited for troughs and the edges of large pots, perhaps containing a shrub. Although perennial, some gardeners grow is as part of an annual spring display. This plant has gained the Royal Horticultural Society's Award of Garden Merit. It has also been selected as one of the "RHS Plants for Pollinators" which "provide nectar and pollen for bees and the many other types of pollinating insects." Following a "rigorous trial and assessment programme" the RHS determined it to be robust, with both colour and form as "stable". It is largely pest and disease-resistant.

Several cultivars are available: 'Citrina', with paler yellow blooms than the ordinary form; 'Dudley Neville' with golden yellow or tan-tinged blooms sometimes described as "biscuit"; and 'Variegata' with cream-margined leaves.

=== Growing methods ===
Aurinia grows best in an open position in full sunlight. Ideally the soil should contain plenty of chalk, sand or grit, and be free draining but not rich, but the plant is among the "indestructibles" and adapts readily to a wide variety of soils.

It may be propagated readily from seed sown in the fall, or from tip cuttings taken in late spring and early summer. Space the plants about 4in apart, giving them plenty of growing room. Aurinia is widely available at garden centers, so home propagation is not really necessary unless you have an unusual form or need great numbers of plants. Small amounts only of complete plant food may be given in early spring as a boost, but feeding is not essential.

To keep Aurinia tidy, it can be sheared back with clippers, (unless you are waiting for the seeds to ripen.) Shearing the plant also helps to keep a compact, neatly rounded shape.

No specific problems are known besides poor drainage. Over watering pot-grown specimens can quickly rot and can kill the plants

=== Flowering ===
Flowers appear from mid-to late spring, the flowers completely covering the plant and hiding the foliage. The flowers are generally considered not suitable for picking but may be used in nosegays and tussy-mussies.
