= Odontarrhena troodi =

Scientific classification
- Kingdom: Plantae
- Clade: Tracheophytes
- Clade: Angiosperms
- Clade: Eudicots
- Clade: Rosids
- Order: Brassicales
- Family: Brassicaceae
- Genus: Odontarrhena
- Species: O. troodi

Binomial name
- Odontarrhena troodi (Boiss.) Španiel, Al-Shehbaz, D.A.German & Marhold

Synonyms
- Alyssum coriaceum Nyár.; Alyssum troodi Boiss.

Species of flowering plant

Odontarrhena troodi is a 10–25 cm (3.9–9.8 in) high perennial subshrub. The leaves are 5–10 mm (0.20–0.39 in) long, obovate to spatulate in shape, covered with a silvery indumentum. Flowering and sterile shoots are found on the same plant; on sterile shoots the leaves form terminal clusters. Flowers have 3 mm (0.12 in) long golden-yellow petals. The siliques are 7–8 mm (0.28–0.31 in) long, elliptic and glabrous. The plant flowers from May to July.

== Distribution ==
Odontarrhena troodi is endemic to the Troodos Mountains in Cyprus, from 1,300 metres (4,300 ft) elevation to the highest summit of Hionistra.
