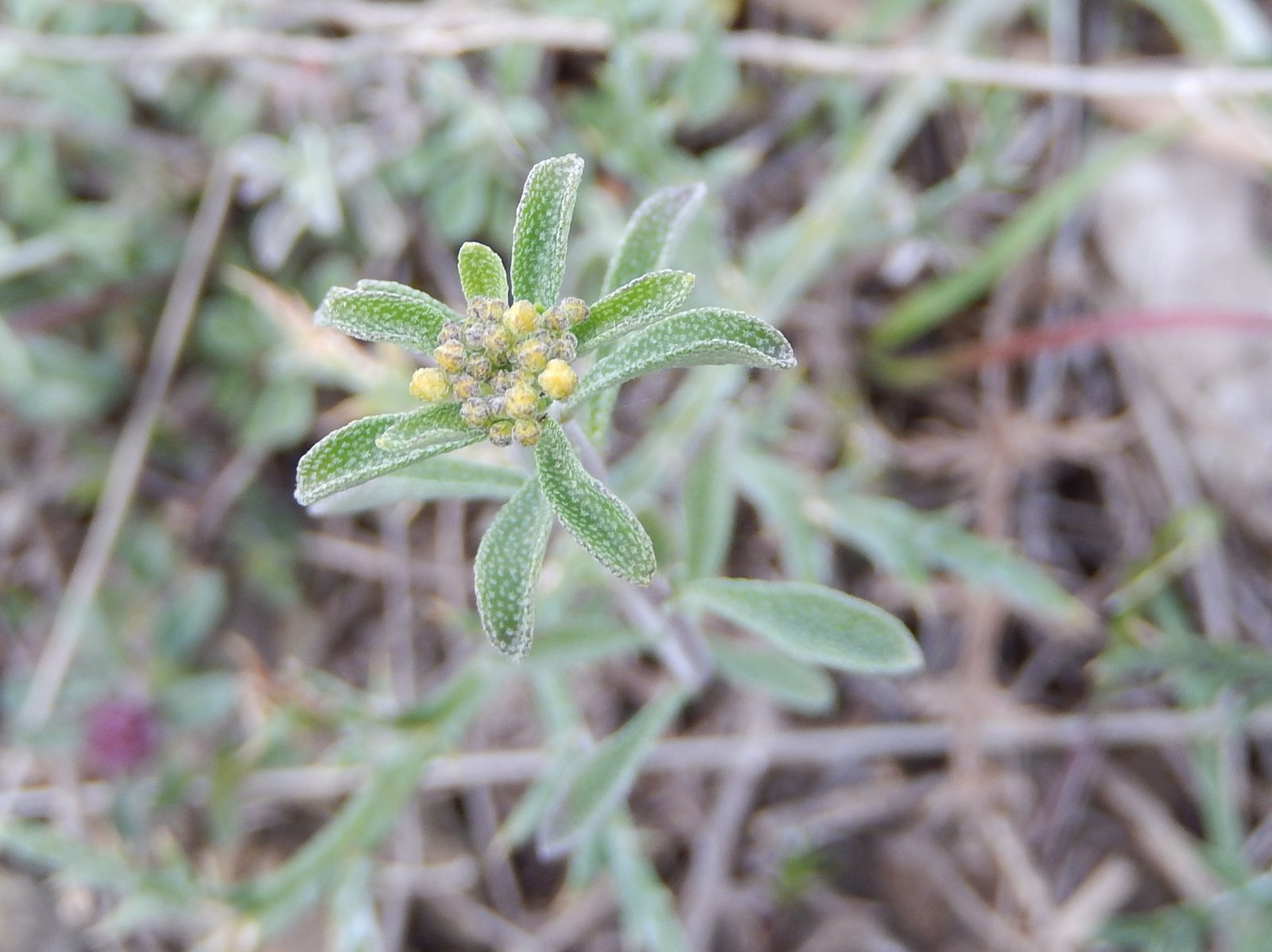

Scientific classification
- Kingdom: Plantae
- Clade: Tracheophytes
- Clade: Angiosperms
- Clade: Eudicots
- Clade: Rosids
- Order: Brassicales
- Family: Brassicaceae
- Genus: Odontarrhena
- Species: O. bertolonii

Binomial name
- Odontarrhena bertolonii (Desv.) Jord. & Fourr.

Synonyms
- Alyssum bertolonii Desv.

= Odontarrhena bertolonii =

Species of flowering plant

Odontarrhena bertolonii is a species of flowering plant in the family Brassicaceae. Its native range is Central Italy, making it endemic to the region.

== Description ==
A small subshrub, typically 20 centimeters tall, blooms from April to June.

== Subtaxa ==
The following subspecies are accepted:

• Odontarrhena bertolonii subsp. bertolonii

• Odontarrhena bertolonii subsp. cesalpinoana Selvi

== Uses ==
=== As a hyperaccumulator ===
Under the name Alyssum bertolonii, the species was analyzed in 1948 for its ability to concentrate unusually high amounts of heavy metals in above-ground tissues, specifically nickel, making it the first documented nickel hyperaccumulator plant. When first discovered, it was deduced that the species could become a means of searching for nickel deposits in the region.
