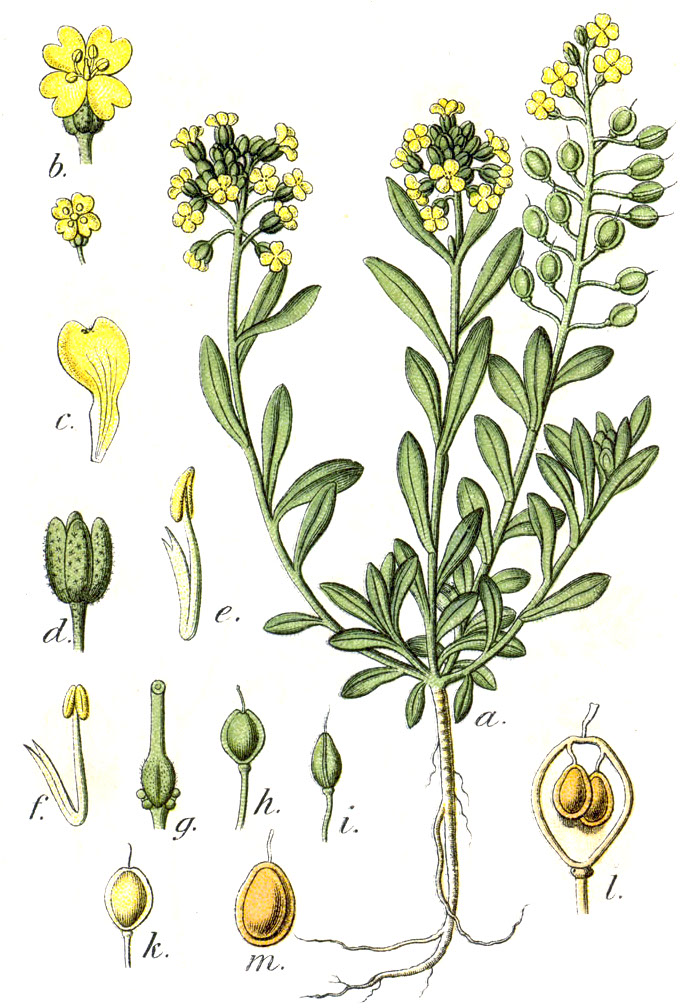

Scientific classification
- Kingdom: Plantae
- Clade: Tracheophytes
- Clade: Angiosperms
- Clade: Eudicots
- Clade: Rosids
- Order: Brassicales
- Family: Brassicaceae
- Genus: Alyssum
- Species: A. montanum

Binomial name
- Alyssum montanum L.

Synonyms
- Ayseton bertolinii Sweet; Ayseton diffusum Sweet; Alyssum albescens Schltdl. ex DC.; Alyssum alpinum Scop; Alyssum arenarium C.Presl; Alyssum beugesiacum Jord. & Fourr.; Alyssum berevifolium Jord. & Fourr.; Alyssum campestre Marz.-Penc. ex Pollini; Alyssum collicolum Rouy & Foucaud; Alyssum collinum Jord. & Fourr.; Alyssum erigens Jord. & Fourr.; Alyssum flexicaule Jord.; Alyssum olympicum Halacsy; Alyssum petrophilum Heldr. ex Nyman; Alyssum porphyreticum Jord. & Fourr.; Alyssum psammeum Jord. & Fourr.; Alyssum rhodanense Jord. & Fourr.; Alyssum rochelii Andrz. ex Rchb.; Alyssum rostratum Wierzb. ex Nyman; Alyssum samborense Kuann; Alyssum spruneri Jord. & Fourr.; Alyssum styriacum Jord. & Fourr.; Alyssum thessalum Halacsy; Alyssum vernale Kit. ex Hornem.; Alyssum vourinonense Dudley & Rech.f.; Alyssum xerophilum Jord. & Fourr.; Anodontea arenaria (C.Presl) G.Don; Clypeola montana Crantz; Crucifera alyssum E.H.L.Krause

= Alyssum montanum =

Species of flowering plant

Alyssum montanum is a species of flowering plant belonging to the family Brassicaceae. It is an evergreen, prostrate perennial with small, hairy, greyish leaves. It typically grows to 10-15 centimeters tall and 30-45 centimeters across. It produces tiny, yellow, fragrant flowers from May to July. These flowers are typically 4-6 centimeters across and borne in dense racemes.

It is native to France, Switzerland, and Germany. It grows best in full sun with good drainage, and is drought tolerant once established. It is suitable for USDA hardiness zones 3–9, but may be susceptible to aphids and root rot.

Subspecies:

- Alyssum montanum subsp. gmelinii (Jord. & Fourr.) Hegi & E.Schmid (synonym: Alyssum gmelinii Jord.)
