= BrassiBase =

Website with Brassicaceae database

BrassiBase is on online resource that documents information and research related to species within the plant family Brassicaceae. It is hosted by the University of Heidelberg. The website defines itself as "tools and biological resources for Brassicaceae character and trait studies". Researchers studying Brassicaceae species use the tools provided in BrassiBase to refine the taxonomy and evolutionary history of plants in this family and to perform phylogenetic analyses.
